= 2020–2021 Indian farmers' protest =

Protests in India against three farm acts

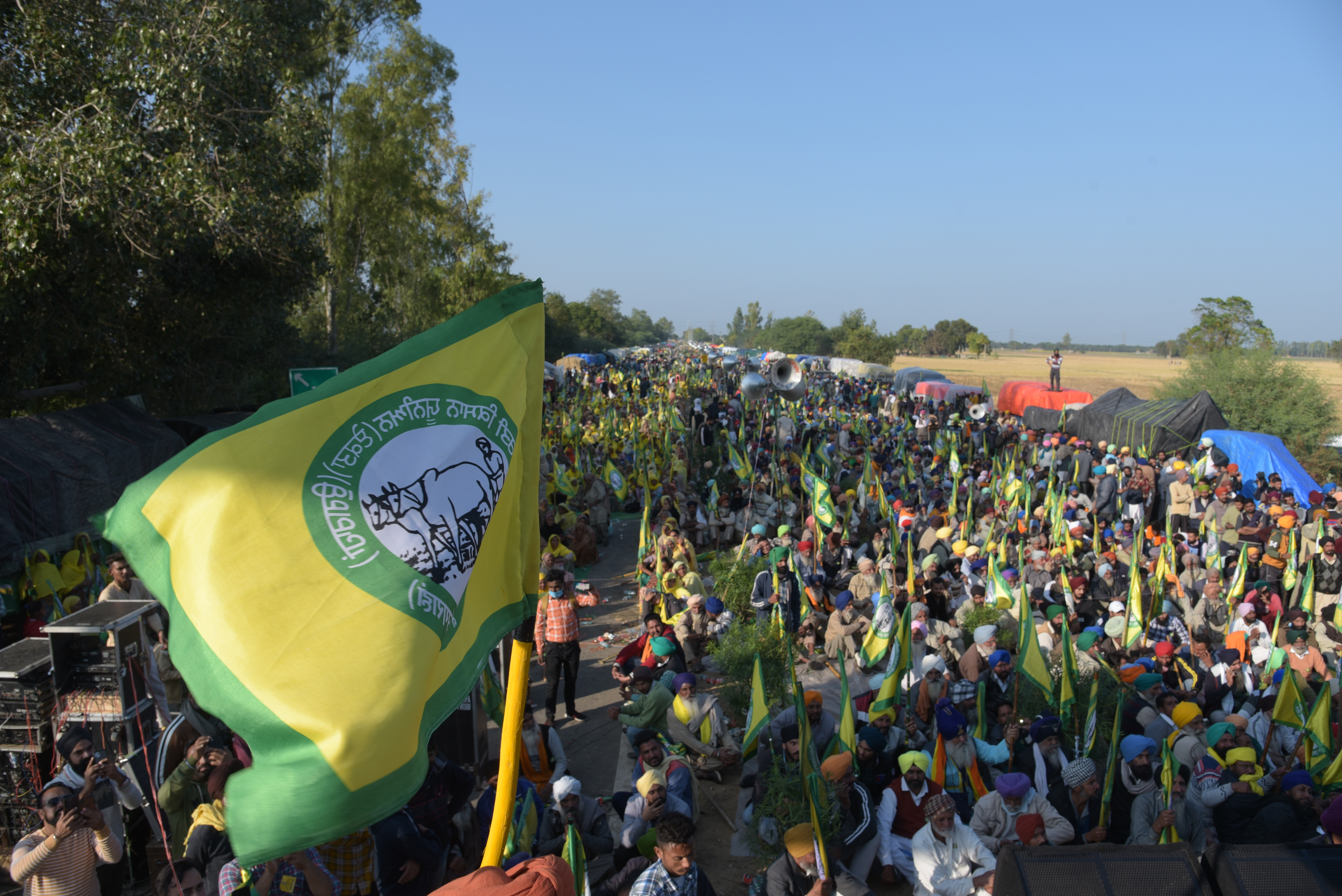
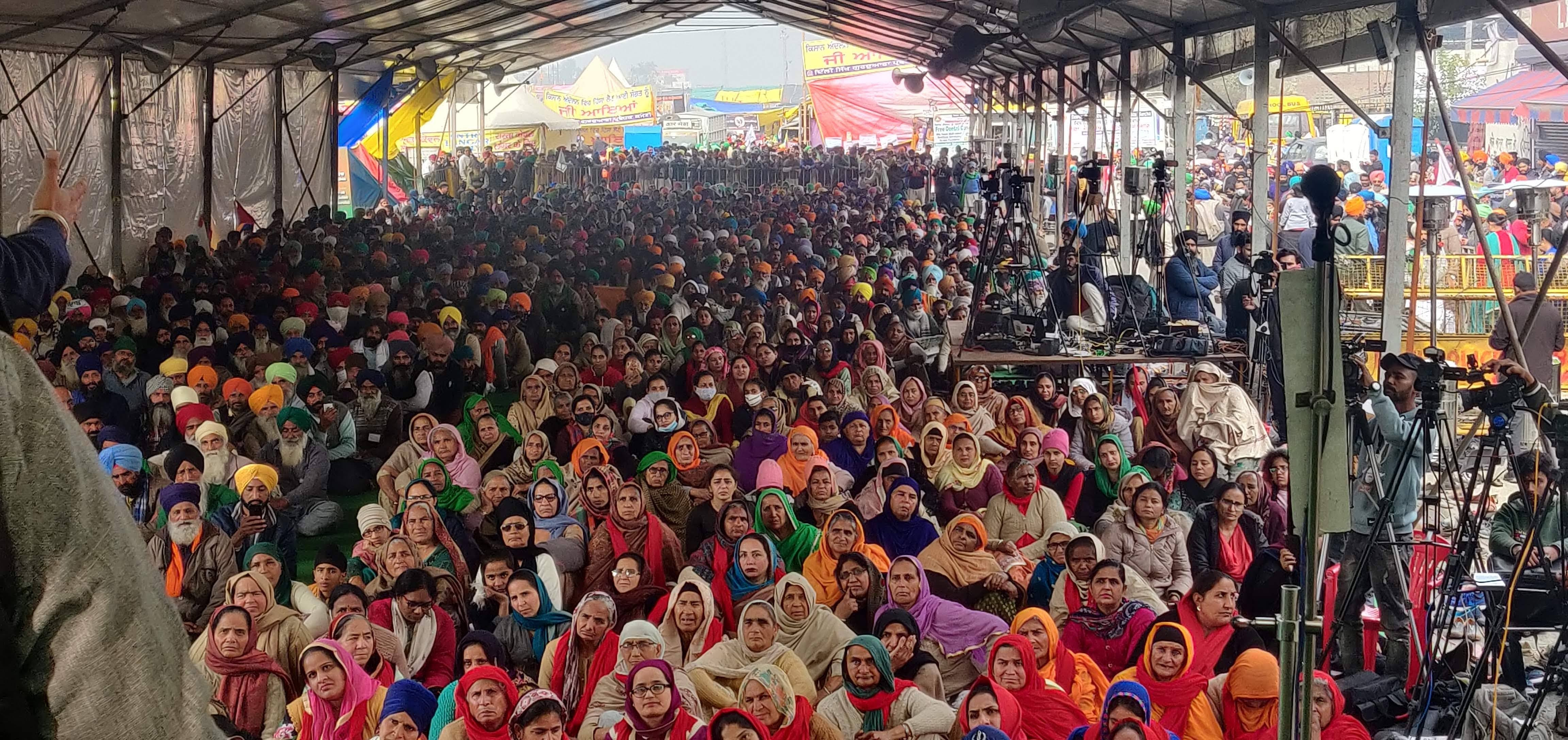
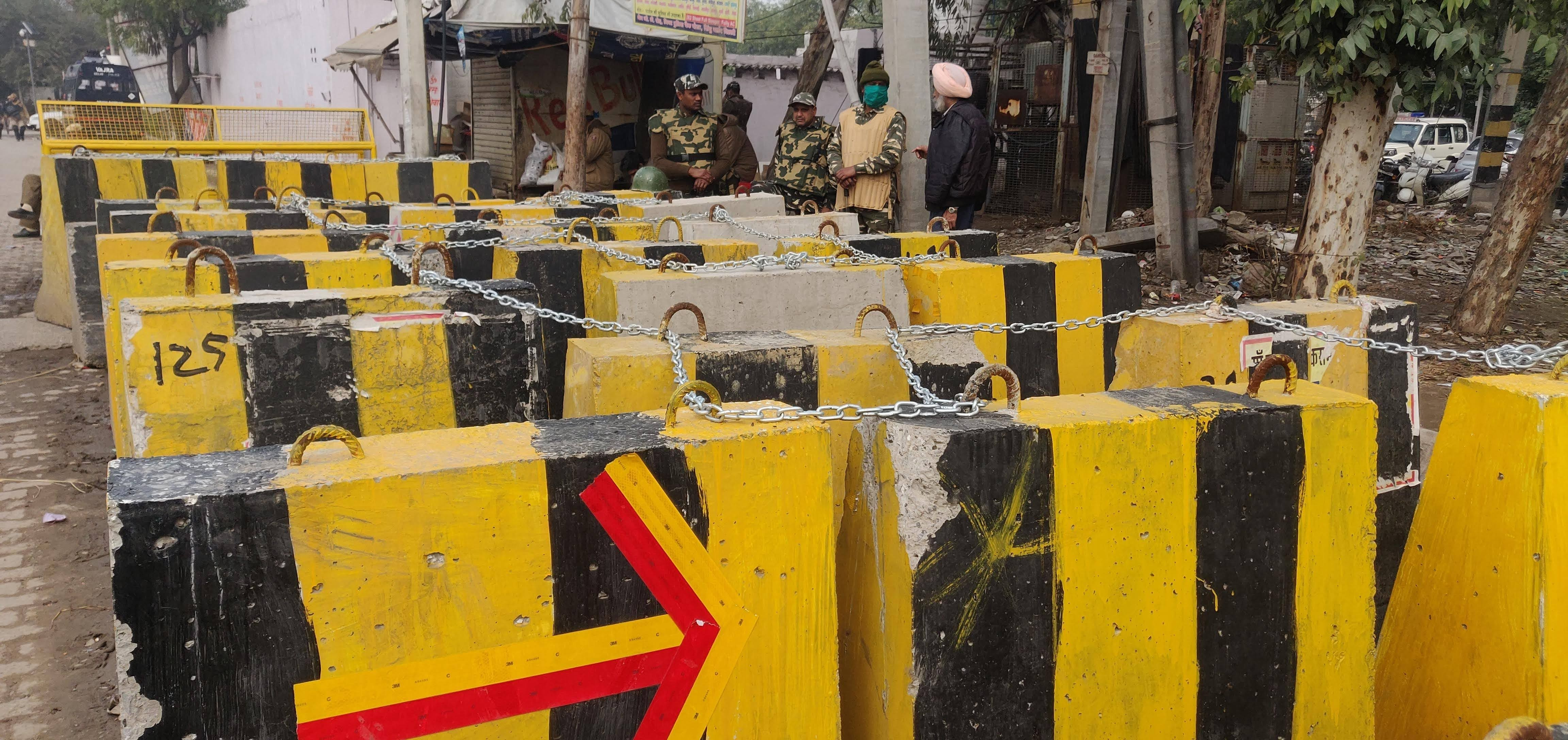
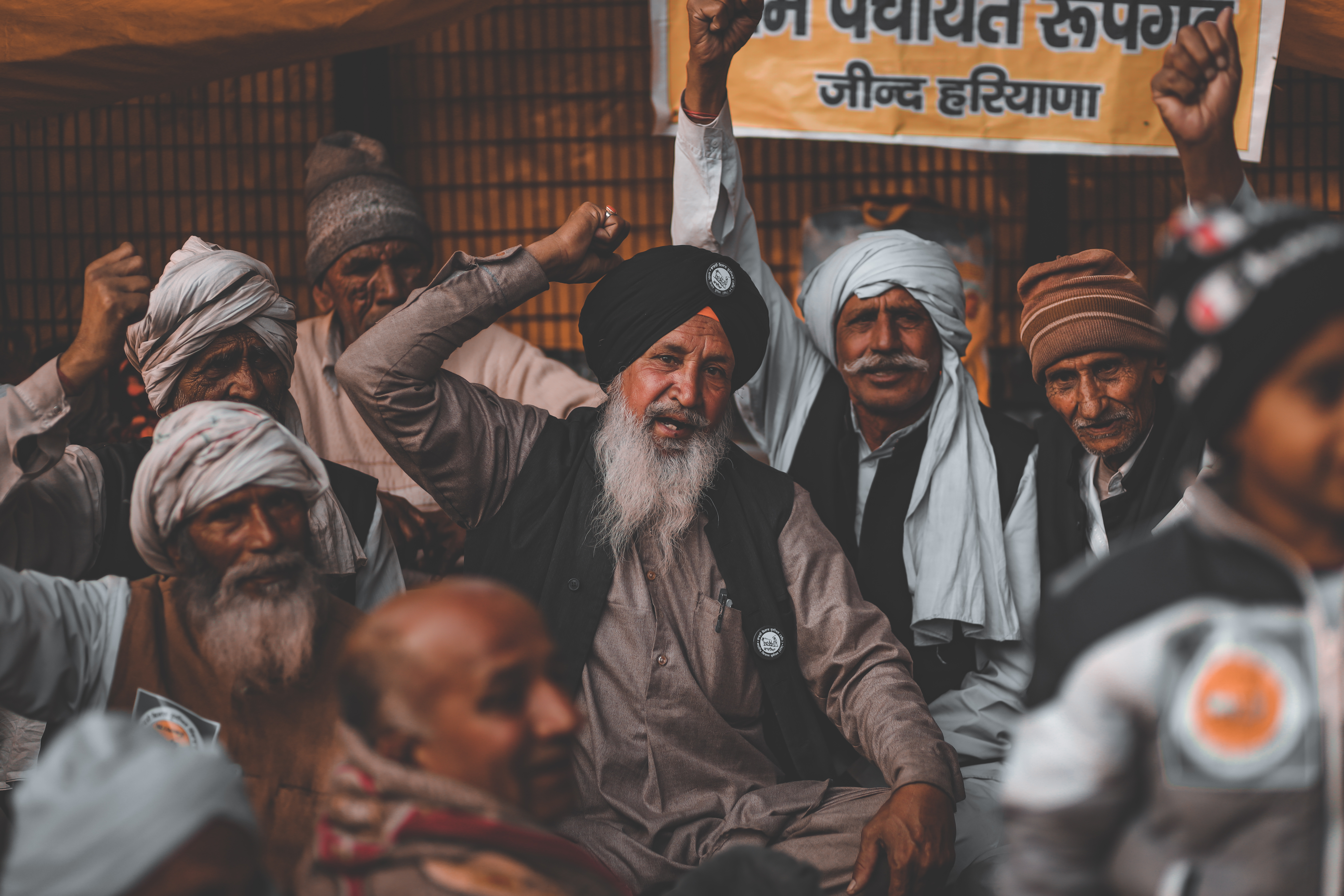
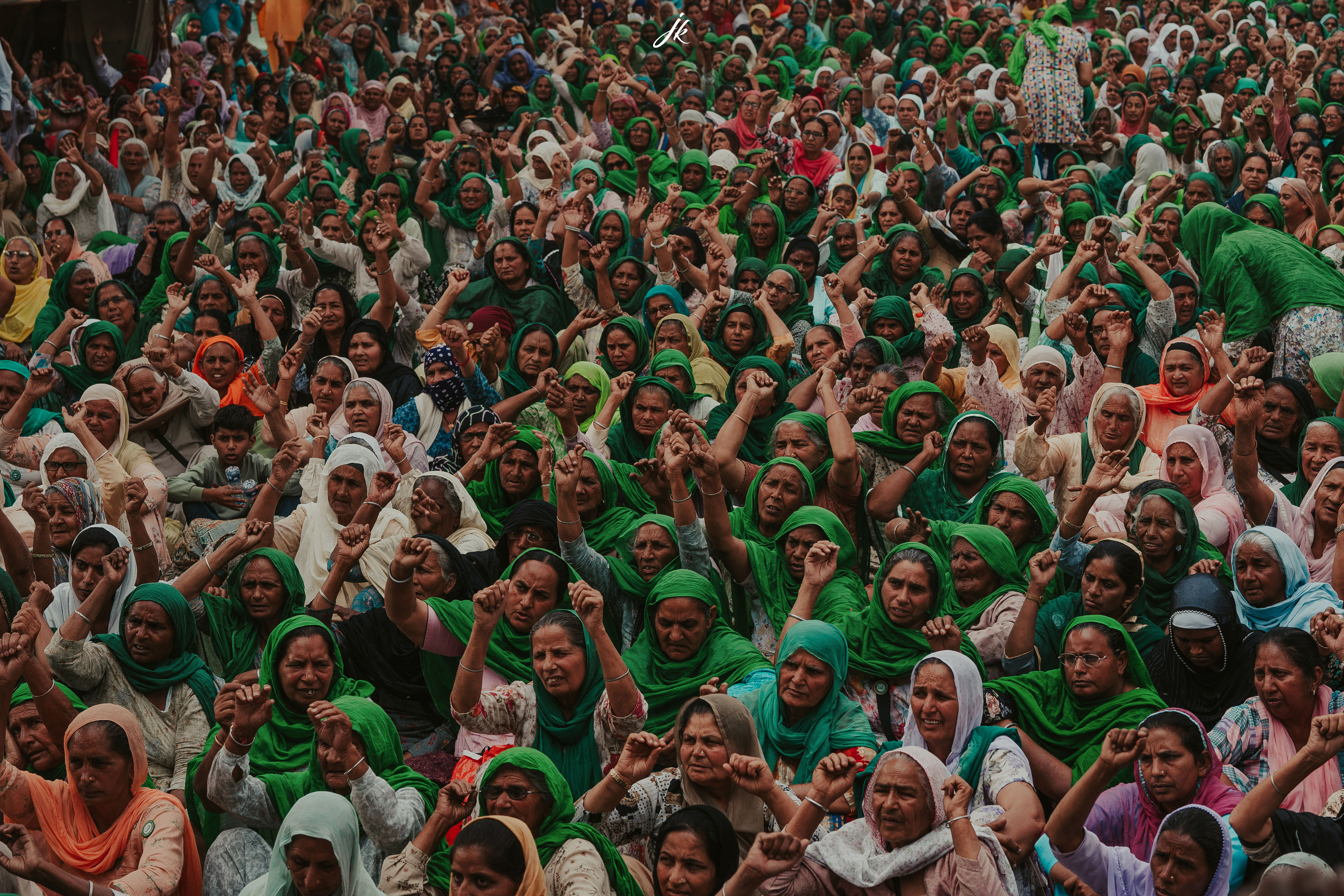
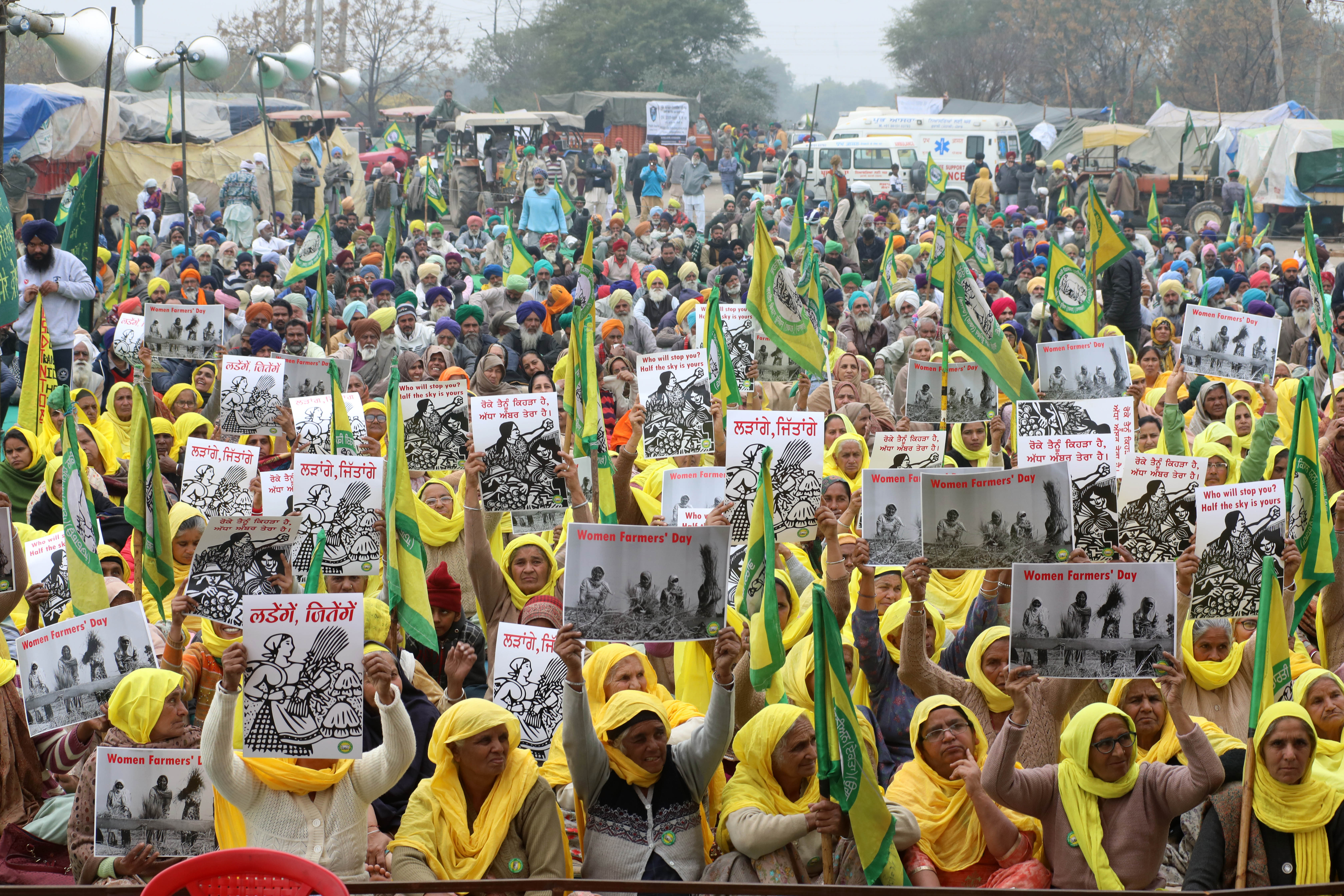
- Date: 9 August 2020 – 11 December 2021 (1 year, 4 months, 2 days)
- Location: India
- Caused by: Passage of three farm related bills by the Indian parliament
- Goals: Revocation of all the three Farm Bills; Guaranteed MSPs; Justice for Lakhimpur Kheri violence; Bring farmer-trader dispute under judiciary instead of SDM (see section Demands for more details)
- Methods: Gherao (encirclement), dharna (sit-in), raasta roko (traffic obstruction), demonstration, suicide, counterlegislation
- Result: All three farm bills repealed Committee on MSP to be formed

Parties
Government of India
- Ministry of Agriculture and Farmers' Welfare
Supported by:
- Bharatiya Janata Party
- Janata Dal (United)
- Rashtriya Lok Janshakti Party
- All India Anna Dravida Munnetra Kazhagam
- Apna Dal (Sonelal)
- National People's Party
- Nationalist Democratic Progressive Party
- All Jharkhand Students Union
- Sikkim Krantikari Morcha
- Mizo National Front
- Naga People's Front
- Republican Party of India (Athawale)
- Pattali Makkal Katchi
- YSR Congress Party
- Bodoland People's Front
- Tamil Maanila Congress
- Samyukt Kisan Morcha
  - All India Kisan Sangharsh Coordination Committee
  - Bharatiya Kisan Union
  - All India Kisan Sabha (CPIM)
  - All India Kisan Sabha (CPI)
  - Jai Kisan Andolan
  - Lok Sangharsh Morcha
  - National Alliance of People's Movements
  - All India Kisan Mahasabha
  - Punjab Kisan Union
  - Other farmer unions
- Bharatiya Kisan Sangh
- Akali Nihangs
Supported by:
- Rashtriya Lok Dal
- Indian National Congress
- Communist Party of India (Marxist)
- Communist Party of India
- Communist Party of India (Marxist-Leninist) Liberation
- Revolutionary Socialist Party
- All India Forward Bloc
- Rashtriya Janata Dal
- Samajwadi Party
- Dravida Munnetra Kazhagam
And others...

Lead figures
Ram Nath Kovind; Narendra Modi; Narendra Singh Tomar; Kailash Choudhary	Chaudhary Ajit Singh; Rakesh Tikait; Balbir Singh Rajewal; Gurnam Singh Charuni; Atul Kumar Anjaan; Joginder Singh Ugrahan; Ashok Dhawale; Hannan Mollah; Hanuman Beniwal

Number
	unverified until 20 March 2021 40,000 (according to Haryana Police on 21 March 2021; this includes 18,000-19,000 protesters at Singhu border and 20,000–22,000 at Tikri)

Casualties and losses
30 policemen injured during Farmers' Republic day parade (including cases of stabbings)	789 farmers died
- 1 journalist killed; One person lynched for alleged desecration; One activist raped; Infrastructure damage: National highways dug up by arman police to stop protestors from marching to capital; Over 1,500 telecom tower sites damaged by protestors (as of 28 December 2022); Government buses and 30 police vehicles damaged on Republic Day which were in to stop their way

The 2020–2021 Indian farmers' protest was a protest against three farm acts passed by the Parliament of India in September 2020. The acts, often called the Farm Bills, had been described as "anti-farmer laws" by many farmer unions, and politicians from the opposition who said that the three laws would leave farmers at the "mercy of corporates" since the farmer-trader disputes were taken to SDM instead of judiciary. The protests demanded the creation of a minimum support price (MSP) bill, to ensure that corporates cannot control the prices. The Union Government, however, maintained that the laws would make it effortless for farmers to sell their produce directly to big buyers, and stated that the protests are based on misinformation. Related endemic legacy issues include farmer suicides and low farmer incomes. Despite India being largely self-sufficient in foodgrain production and having welfare schemes, hunger and nutrition remain serious issues, with India ranking as one of the worst countries in the world in food security parameters. Due to unfulfilled previous demands 2024 Indian farmers' protest started on 13 of February 2024.

Soon after the acts were introduced, unions began holding local protests, mostly in Punjab state. After two months of protests, farmer unions—mainly from Punjab and neighbouring Haryana—began a movement named Dilli Chalo (transl. Let's go to Delhi), in which tens of thousands of union members marched towards the nation's capital. The Indian government ordered the police and law enforcement of various states to stop the protesters using water cannons, batons, and tear gas to prevent them entering Haryana and then Delhi. November 2020 saw a nationwide general strike in support of the farmers and thousands converging at various border points on the way to Delhi. Eleven rounds of talks took place between the central government and farmers represented by the farm unions between 14 October 2020 and 22 January 2021; all were inconclusive with agreement on only two relatively minor points. Smaller but richer states of Haryana and Punjab, with large surplus food production, are the massive provider of food security to India as they provide 70-90% of wheat and 28-44% of rice of India's total PDS. Hence, farm reform was considered to be a more sensitive issue in these food surplus states as compared to other net food consumer states with negative food security such as BIMARU states.

While a section of farmer unions was protesting, the Indian government claimed that some unions had come out in support of the farm laws. By mid-December 2020, the Supreme Court of India had received a batch of petitions asking for the removal of blockades created by the protesters around Delhi. Farmers said that they will not listen to the courts if told to back off, and that staying the implementation of the farm laws was not a solution. This was also the time of the COVID-19 pandemic, in light of which the central government had put in place a nation-wide lockdown. A section of the farmers, however, interpreted this move of pandemic governance too convenient. Ultimately, the social distancing mandates came to be seen as the state's resistance to disband the farmers which in turn consolidated the protests. The farmers camped at the borders, settled in and built a home on the highways blocking inter-state mobility until the government finally repealed the farm laws after a year.

The Supreme Court of India stayed the implementation of the farm laws in January 2021. Farmer leaders welcomed the stay order, which remained in effect until they were eventually repealed. A Supreme Court-appointed committee submitted its confidential report before the court on 19 March 2021. Six state governments (Kerala, Punjab, Chhattisgarh, Rajasthan, Delhi and West Bengal) passed resolutions against the farms acts, and three states (Punjab, Chhattisgarh and Rajasthan) tabled counter-legislation in their respective state assemblies. None of the counter-legislations was signed into law by the respective state governors.

The protests were often criticized by the Indian government to be a foreign conspiracy. In a statement to Supreme Court, the government stated that the protests have been infiltrated by Khalistanis. On 26 January 2021, India's Republic Day, tens of thousands of the farmers held a farmer's parade with a large convoy of tractors and drove into Delhi. The protesters deviated from the pre-sanctioned routes permitted by the Delhi Police resulting in violence and clashes with the police. Later, protesters reached Red Fort and installed farmer union flags and Sikh religious flags on the mast on the rampart of the Red Fort. On 19 November 2021, the union government decided to repeal the bills, and both houses of Parliament passed the Farm Laws Repeal Bill, 2021 on 29 November. Following the announcement of the repeal, farmer unions continued with the demand for guaranteed minimum support prices (MSPs), reminding the government of the aim of doubling farmers' income by 2022; and the 2004 M. S. Swaminathan–headed National Commission on Farmers reports. The Supreme Court appointed committee report was released by a committee member on 21 March 2022.

== Background ==
India is self-sufficient in the production of food such as food grains (Note: The definition of 'food grains' varies) including wheat and rice; and other categories such as fruits, vegetables, milk and meat among others. Yet, despite this, nutrition and hunger remain a serious challenge in the country. In 2021, India ranked 101 out of 116 countries in the Global Hunger Index. According to the United Nations, India bears 1/4th of the entire world's hunger burden. This is despite India having overarching food ration and welfare schemes.

The Agriculture Census in India, last held in 2014, identified that farmers in India have small land holdings, one of the reasons they are not able to meet their needs. Two-thirds of the land holdings in the country are less than one hectare. Part-time farming in the country is not common. Other related issues include farmer suicides and the state of the economy in India. India reported a total 296,438 Indian farmers suicides between 1995 and 2015. In 2019, 10,281 people who work in the farming sector committed suicide, that is 28 people a day. The slower growth of Punjab's economy, particularly its agricultural sector, is believed to have helped fuel the protest. This includes issues arising from its paddy-wheat monoculture and warnings of desertification.

Average monthly household income across rural India (State-wise comparison) The 2017 Committee on Doubling Farmers' Income report stated that 22.5% of farmers live below India's official poverty line. In 2013, average farmer income was ₹6,426 (equivalent to ₹12,000 or US$130 in 2026) while its average monthly consumption expenditure was ₹6,223 (equivalent to ₹12,000 or US$120 in 2026).

=== Second green revolution ===
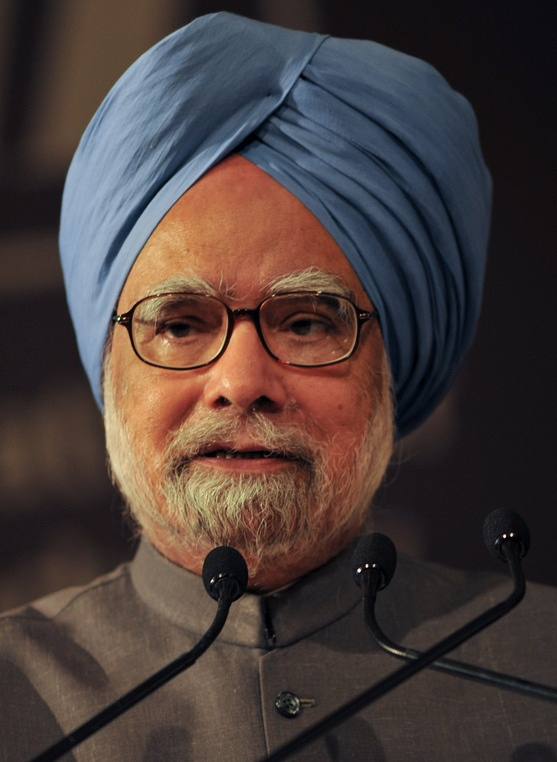
Manmohan Singh felt the need of second green revolution. "Manmohan Singh talked about it but Modi is having to do it now," Prime Minister Modi in Parliament in February 2021.

Former Prime Minister Manmohan Singh, during an interview in 2004, said,

We need a second green revolution, making use of modern advances [...] For that we need to revitalize India's research agricultural system, India's extension system, India's credit system. The more we commercialize our agriculture, the more our farmers need access to commercial inputs and that was a modernization of our agriculture credit system. [...] There are other rigidities because of the whole marketing regimes set up in the 1930s which prevent our farmers from selling their produce where they get the highest rate of return. It is our intention to remove all those handicaps which come in the way of India realizing its vast potential as one large common market.

On 8 February 2021, in the Rajya Sabha, Prime Minister Modi referenced this interview of Manmohan Singh and said, "Manmohan Singh talked about it but Modi is having to do it now. Be proud". Prime Minister Modi has referred to the second agricultural revolution in 2015, 2016, and 2017.

=== Three agriculture laws ===
2020 Indian agriculture acts
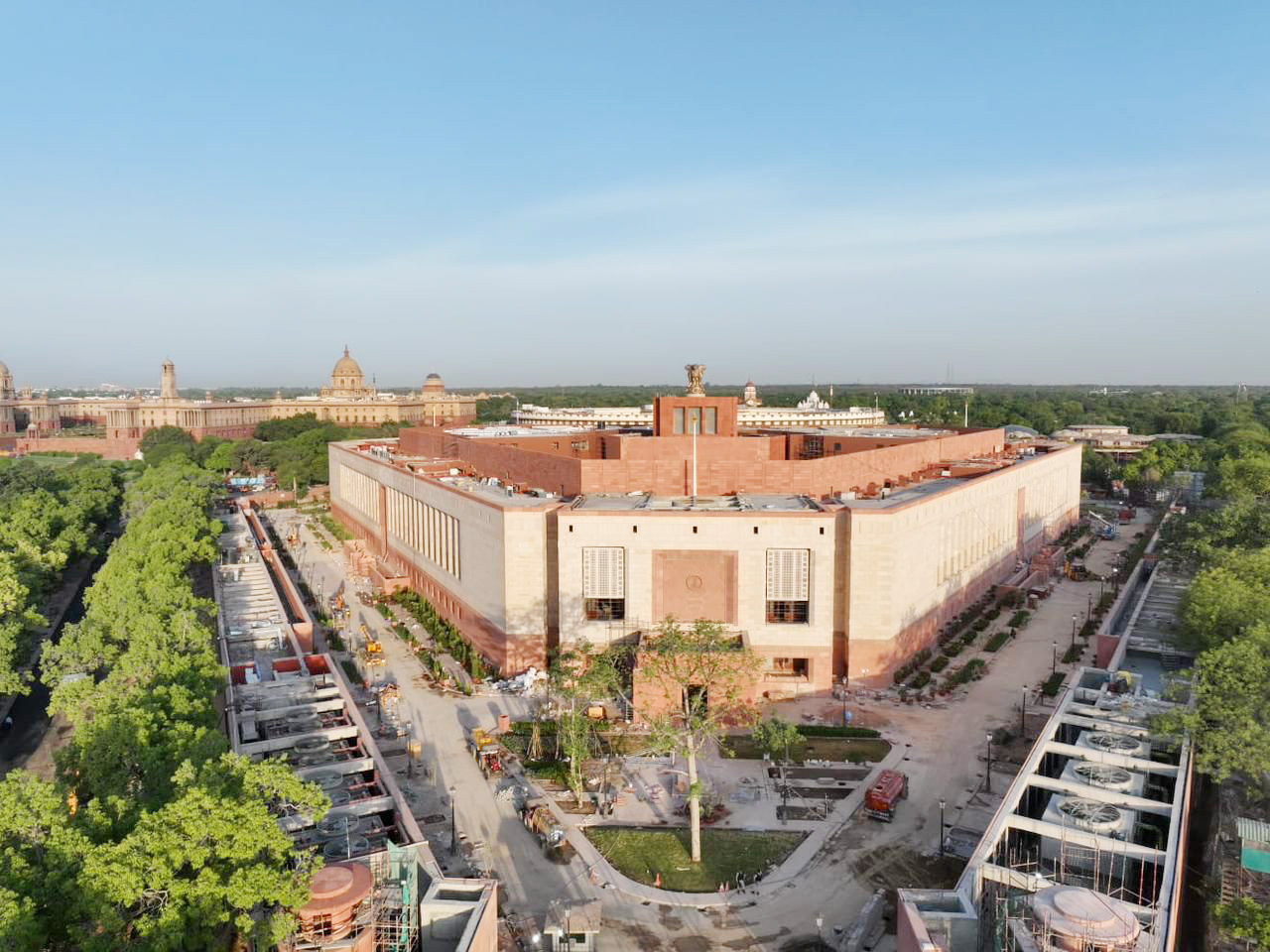
- Parliament

Parliament of India
- Assented to: September 2020

Repeals
- Implementation stayed by Supreme Court on 12 January 2021.

Summary
- The three acts provide for the creation of an ecosystem for farmers and traders, for a national framework on farming agreements and further to amend the Essential Commodities Act, 1955
- Status: Repealed

In 2017, the central government released the Model Farming Acts. However, after a certain period of time, it was found that a number of the reforms suggested in the acts had not been implemented by the states. A committee consisting of seven Chief Ministers was set up in July 2019 to discuss the implementation. Accordingly, the central Government of India promulgated three ordinances (or temporary laws) in the first week of June 2020, which dealt with agricultural produce, their sale, hoarding, agricultural marketing and contract farming reforms among other things. These ordinances were introduced as bills and passed by the Lok Sabha on 15 and 18 September 2020. Later, on 20 and 22 September, the three bills were passed by the Rajya Sabha, where the government is in a minority, via a voice vote – ignoring the requests of the opposition for a full vote. The President of India gave his assent by signing the bills on 28 September, thus converting them into acts. The legality of the acts has been questioned; "agriculture" is mentioned in the state list six times, the union list four times, and the concurrent list two times.

These acts areas are:

1. Farmers' Produce Trade and Commerce (Promotion and Facilitation) Act: expands the scope of trade areas of farmers produce from select areas to "any place of production, collection, and aggregation." Allows electronic trading and e-commerce of scheduled farmers' produce. Prohibits state governments from levying any market fee, cess or levy on farmers, traders, and electronic trading platforms for a trade of farmers' produce conducted in an 'outside trade area'.
2. Farmers (Empowerment and Protection) Agreement on Price Assurance and Farm Services Act: creates a framework for contract farming through an agreement between a farmer and a buyer before the production or rearing of any farm produces. It provides for a three-level dispute settlement mechanism: the conciliation board, Sub-Divisional Magistrate, and Appellate Authority.'
3. Essential Commodities (Amendment) Act: allows for the center to regulate certain food items in the course of extraordinary situations like war or famine. Requires that imposition of any stock limit on agricultural produce be based on price rise.

=== International precedents ===
Many developing economies reformed their agriculture policies in the 1980s and 1990s to encourage private sector participation. Swati Dhingra of the London School of Economics cites the case of Kenya in which their agriculture reforms increased the ease of doing business, however this very increase caused other problems for the farmers. In February 2021, 87 farmers' unions in the United States wrote a solidarity letter, giving the example of Reagan era farm policies – "Reagan era furthered the farm crisis through deliberate federal policy changes, with systematic erosion of parity prices and other deregulatory efforts."

== Farmer unions' demands ==
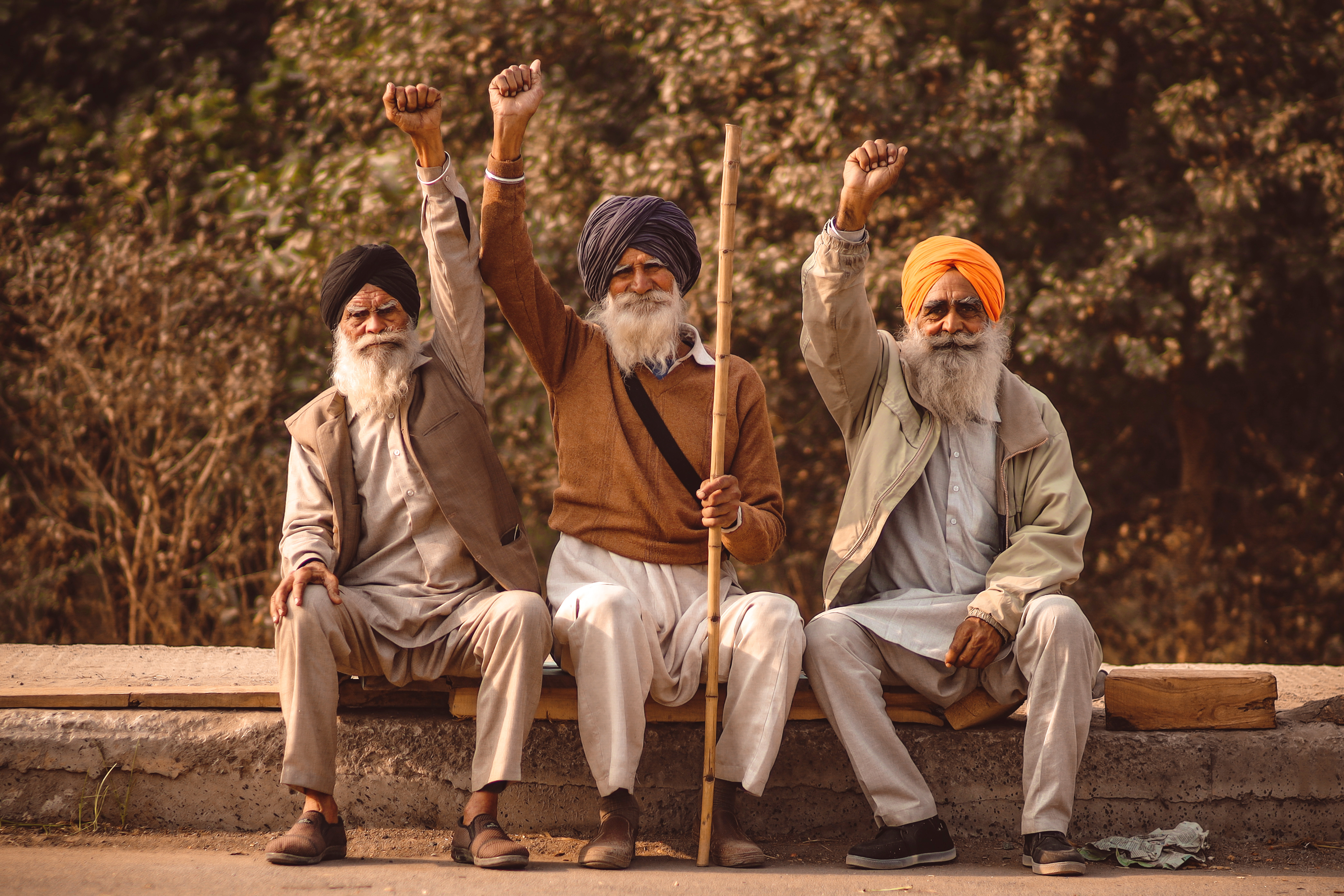
Three protestors during the protests on 26 December 2020

=== Immediate demand ===
- Repeal the farm laws

The farmer unions believe that the laws will open the sale and marketing of agricultural products outside the notified Agricultural Produce Market Committee APMC) mandis for farmers. Further, the laws will allow inter-state trade and encourage hike electronic trading of agricultural produce. The new laws prevent the state governments from collecting a market fee, cess, or levy for trade outside the APMC markets; this has led the farmers to believe the laws will "gradually lead to the deterioration and ultimately end the mandi system" thus "leaving farmers at the mercy of corporates". Further, the farmers believe that the laws will end their existing relationship with agricultural small-scale businessmen (commission agents who act as middlemen by providing financial loans, ensuring timely procurement, and promising adequate prices for their crop). Opponents of the acts further contend that the legislation would expand control over agricultural markets at the expense of small-scale farmers. These arguments build on broader, ongoing debates regarding the corporatisation of Indian agriculture and the influence of international agribusiness.

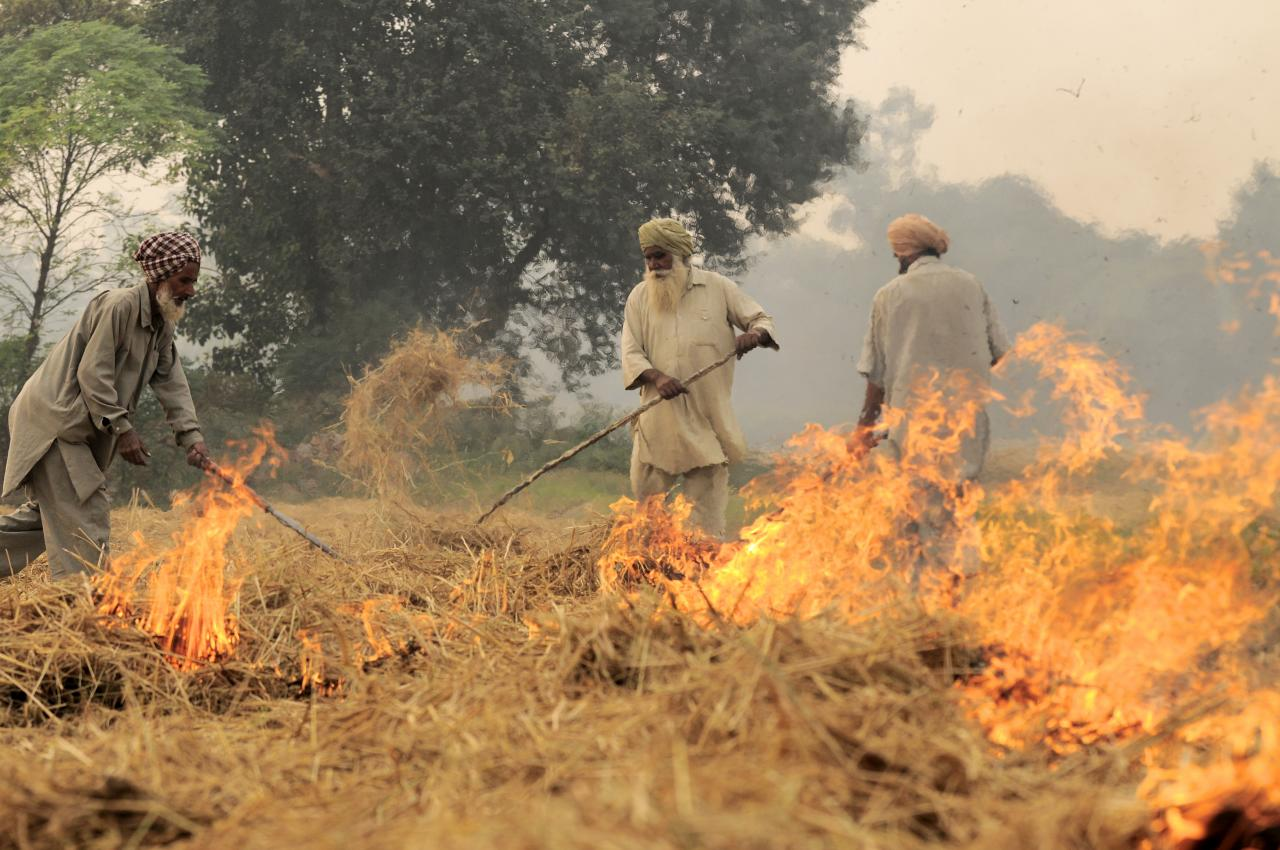
Among the demands is the removal of punishments and fines for stubble burning as well as the release of farmers arrested for burning paddy and wheat stubble in Punjab

=== Later demands ===
Additionally, protesting farmers believe dismantling the APMC mandis will encourage abolishing the purchase of their crops at the Minimum Support Price (MSP). They are therefore demanding the minimum support prices to be guaranteed by the government in writing. Other demands added over time have included-

1. Convene a special Parliament session to repeal the farm laws
2. Make MSP and state procurement of crops a legal right
3. Assurances that conventional procurement system will remain
4. Implement Swaminathan Panel Report and peg MSP at least 50% more than weighted average cost of production
5. Cut diesel prices for agricultural use by 50%
6. Repeal of Commission on Air Quality Management in NCR and the adjoining Ordinance 2020 and removal of punishment and fine for stubble burning
7. Release of farmers arrested for burning paddy and wheat stubble in Punjab
8. Abolishing the Electricity Ordinance 2020
9. Centre should not interfere in state subjects, decentralization in practice
10. Withdrawal of all cases against and release of farmer leaders

Farmers have been insistent over repealing the farm laws. Even after the government offered to stay the farm laws for 18 months on 21 January 2021, the farmers refused the stay and pushed for repeal. Other than the farm unions and leaders, people such as Markandey Katju and Thol. Thirumavalavan have also made statements in relation to staying the farm laws.

==== Minimum support price (MSP) ====
Following the Prime Minister's announcement of the repeal of the farm laws in November 2021, there were renewed demands for a guaranteed MSP. This had been the second major demand throughout the farmers' protest. This came amid reminders of the government's target of doubling farmers' incomes by 2022; in 2016 the finance minister had stated "we need to think beyond food security and give back to our farmers a sense of income security". Relevant recommendations by the MS Swaminathan headed National Commission on Farmers have been cited as a reminder.

=== List of protesting farm unions ===
Under the coordination of bodies such as Samyukt Kisan Morcha and All India Kisan Sangharsh Coordination Committee, (Note: "Kisān" (किसान) means farmer in Hindi.) the protesting farm unions include:

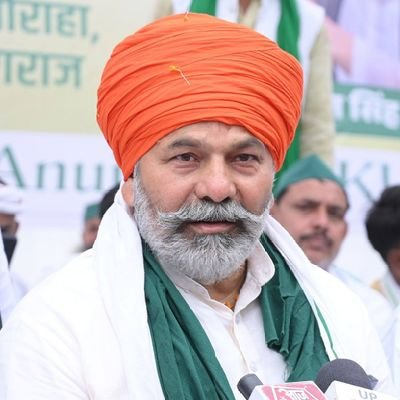
Rakesh Tikait, Bharatiya Kisan Union (BKU Uttar Pradesh)

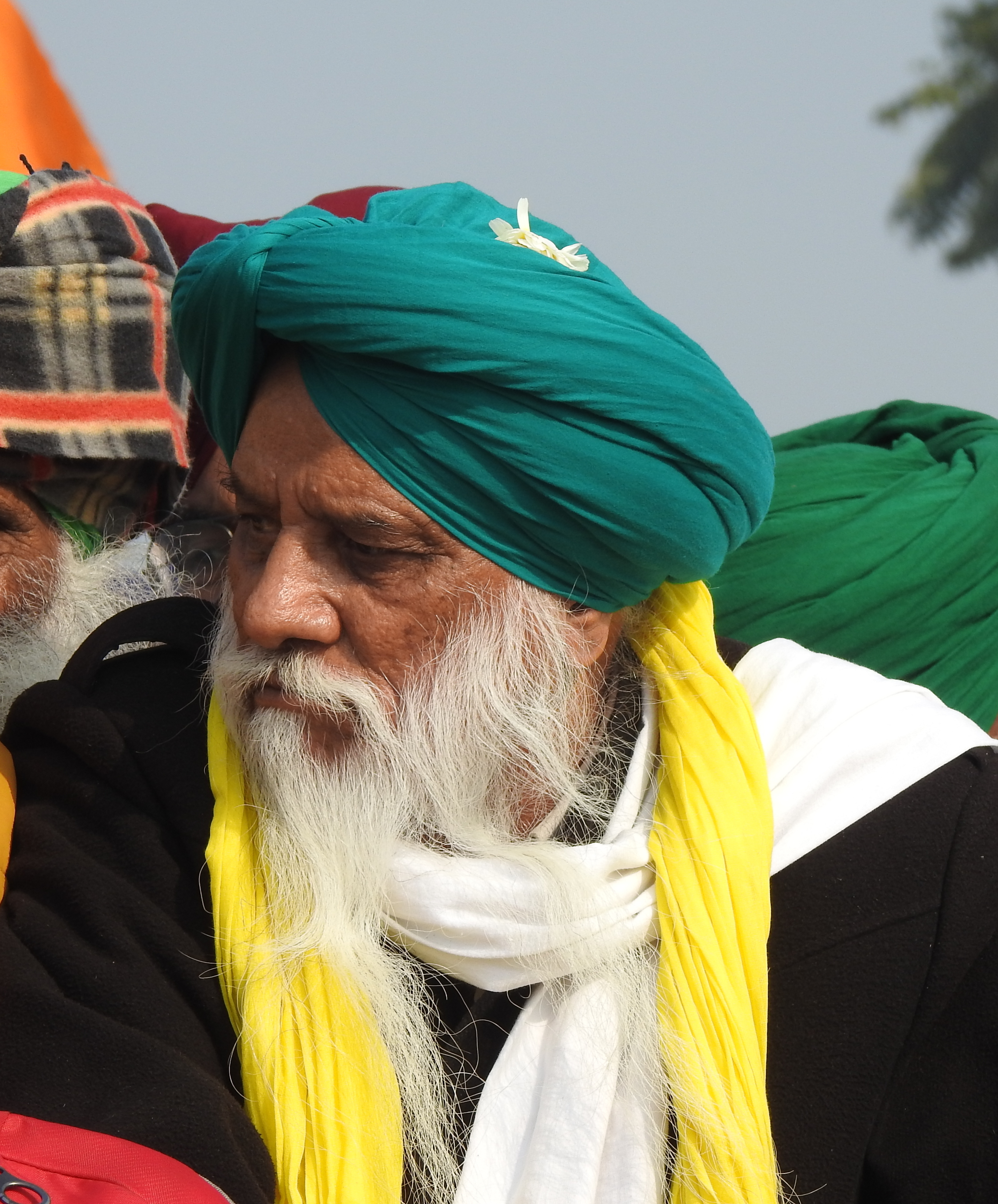
Balbir Singh Rajewal, Bhartiya Kisan Union (BKU Rajewal)

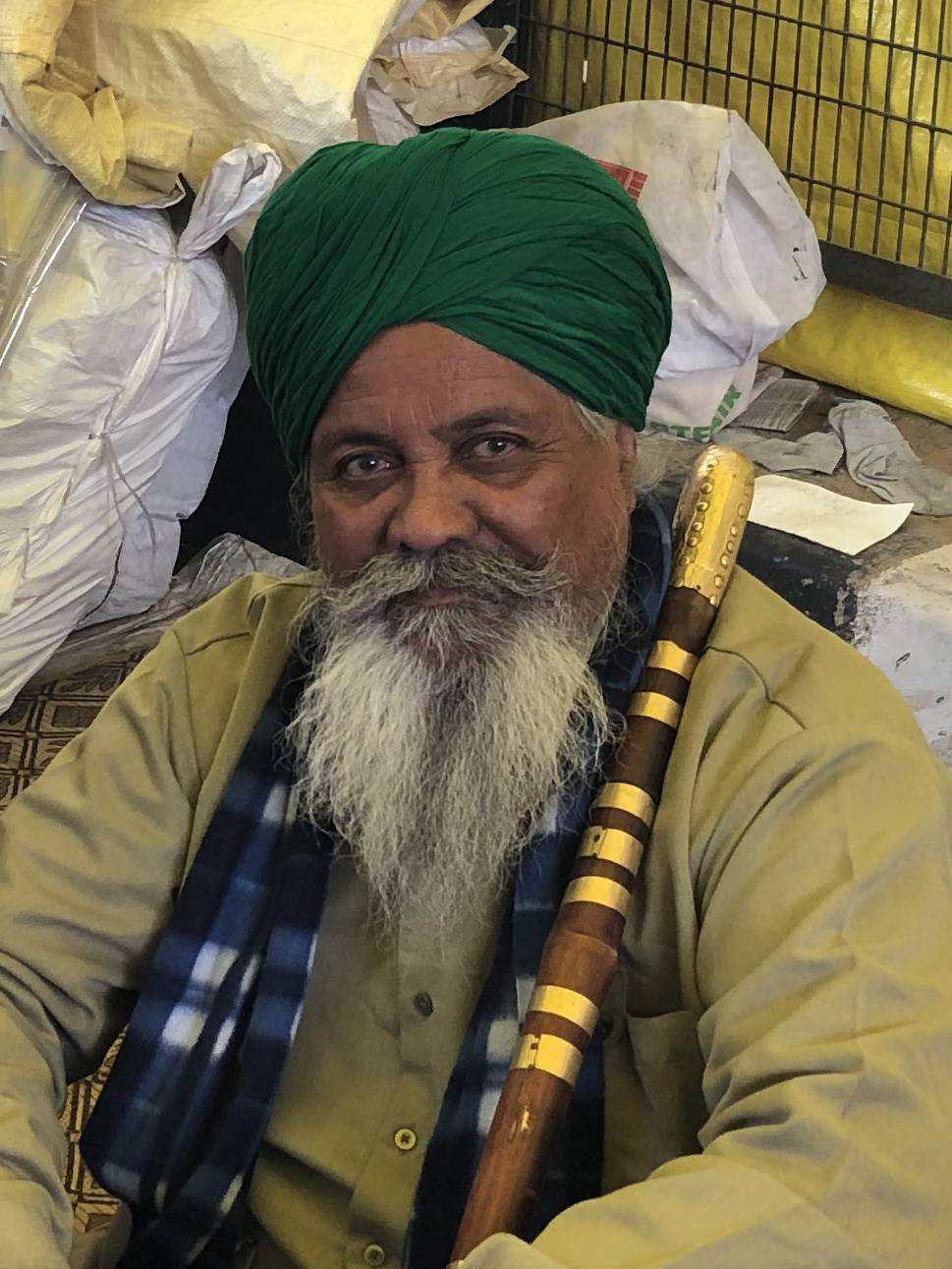
Ruldu Singh Mansa, Bharatiya Kisan Union (Ekta Mansa)

Farm Union leaders during the protest
- Bharatiya Kisan Union (Ugrahan, Sidhupur, Rajewal, Chaduni, Dakaunda)
- Jai Kisan Andolan
- All India Kisan Sabha
- Karnataka Rajya Raitha Sangha
- National Alliance for People's Movements
- Lok Sangharsh Morcha
- All India Kisan Khet Majdoor Sangathan
- Kissan Mazdoor Sangharsh Committee
- Rashtriya Kisan Majdoor Sangathan
- All India Kisan Mazdoor Sabha
- Krantikari Kisan Union
- ASHA-Kisan Swaraj
- Lok Sangharsh Morcha
- All India Kisan Mahasabha
- Punjab Kisan Union
- Swabhimani Shetkari Sanghatana
- Sangtin Kisan Mazdoor Sanghatan
- Jamhoori Kisan Sabha
- Kisan Sangharsh Samiti
- Terai Kisan Sabha

Transport bodies such as the All India Motor Transport Congress (AIMTC) have extended support.

== Protests and incidents ==
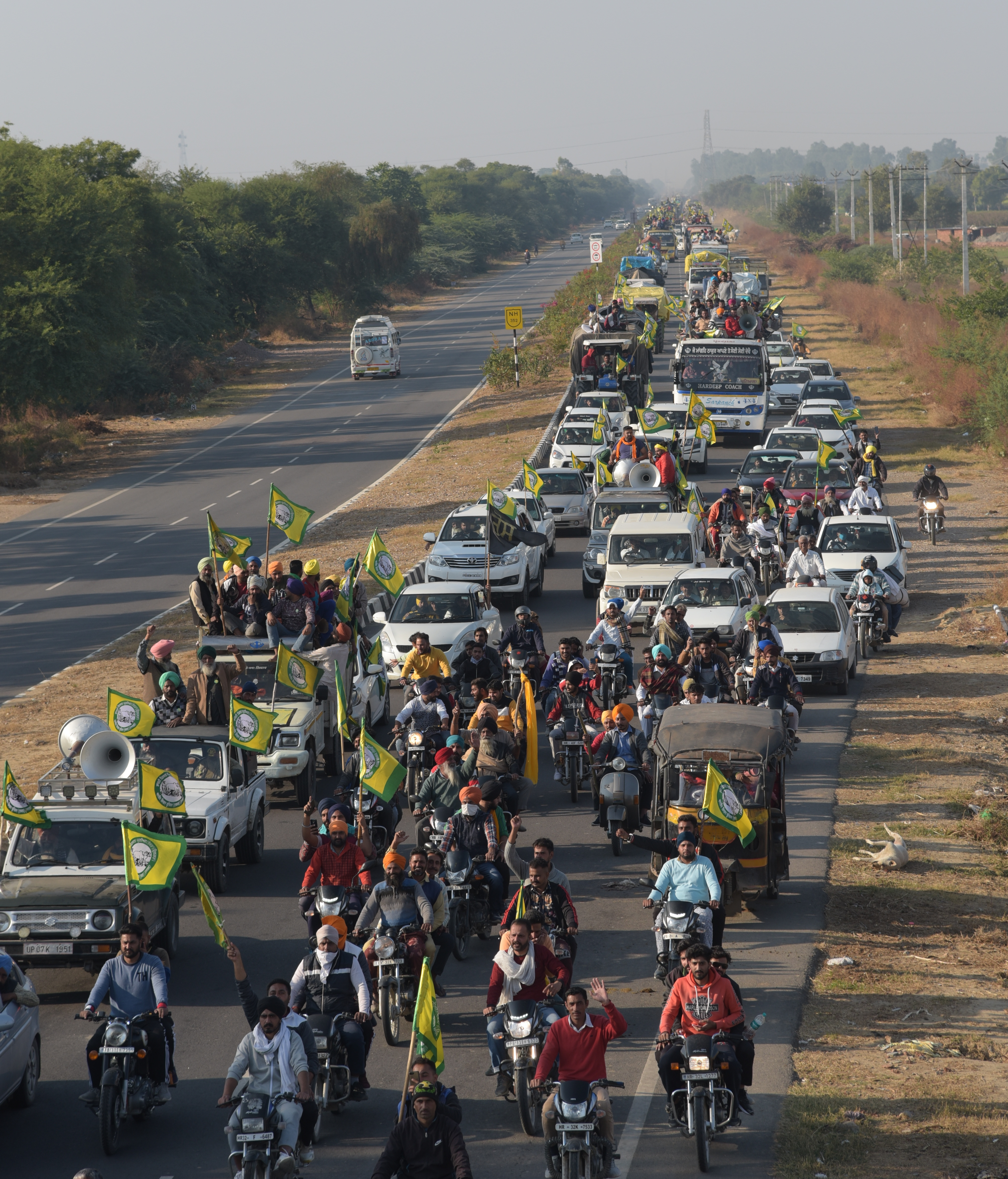
March to Delhi, 27 November

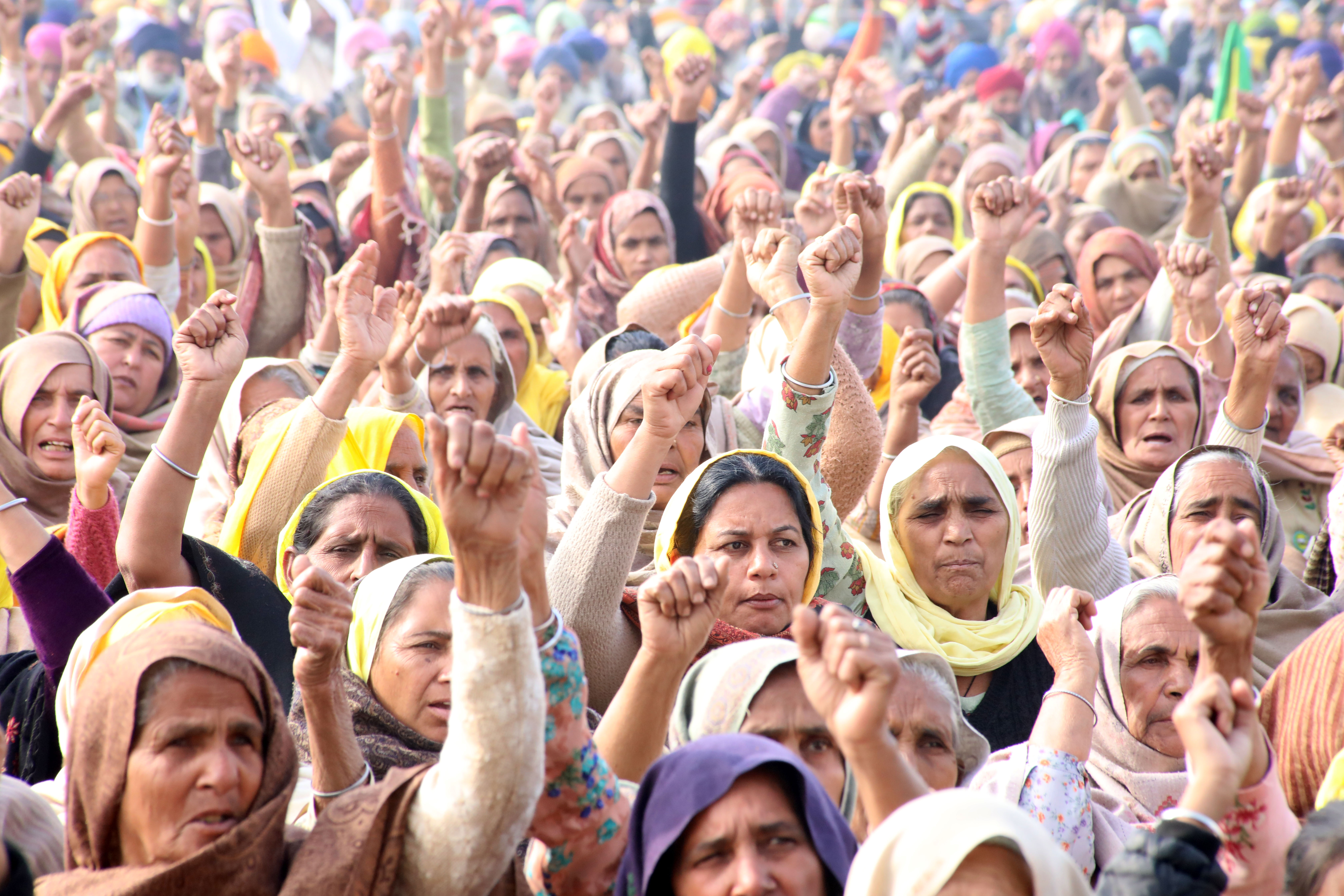
Protests at Tikri border, December 2020

=== 2020 ===
In Punjab, small-scale protests had started in August 2020 when the Farm Bills were made public. It was only after the passage of the acts that more farmers and farm unions across India joined the protests against the reforms. On 25 September 2020 farm unions all over India called for a Bharat Bandh (lit. transl. nation-wide shutting down) to protest against these farm laws. The most widespread protests took place in Punjab, Haryana and Western Uttar Pradesh but demonstrations were also reported in Uttar Pradesh, Karnataka, Tamil Nadu, Odisha, Kerala and other states. Railway services remained suspended in Punjab for more than two months due to the protests, starting from October. Following this, farmers from different states then marched to Delhi to protest against the laws. Farmers also criticized the national media for misrepresenting the protest. From 12 December, farmer unions took over highway toll plazas in Haryana and allowed free movement of vehicles. In certain parts of India, bullock-cart rallies in support of farmer's protest have also been organized by marginal farmers. Transport bodies such as the All India Motor Transport Congress (AIMTC), representing about 9.5 million truckers and 5 million bus and taxi drivers, have threatened to halt the movement of supplies in the northern states, and if the government fails to address the farmer's issues, it would be done nationwide.

==== Rail Roko and Dilli Chalo ====
On 24 September 2020, farmers started a "Rail roko" (transl. "stop the trains") campaign, following which train services to and from Punjab were affected. Farmers extended the campaign into October. On 23 October, some farmer unions decided to call off the campaign, as supplies of fertilizer and other goods in the state were starting to run short.

After failing to get the support of their respective state governments, the farmers decided to pressure the Central Government by marching to Delhi. On 25 November, protesters from the Dilli Chalo (transl. "let us go to Delhi") campaign were met by the police at the borders of the city. The police employed the use of tear gas and water cannons, dug up roads, and used layers of barricades and sand barriers to stop the protesters, leading to at least three farmer casualties. Amidst the clashes, on 27 November, media highlighted the actions of a youth who jumped onto a police water cannon targeting protesting farmers and turned it off. He was later charged with attempted murder.

The march on Delhi was accompanied by a 24-hour strike of millions (Note: Not 250 million people as per various media reports, fact checking done by Alt News) of people across India on 26 November in opposition to both the farm law reform and the proposed changes to the labour law. Between 28 November and 3 December, the number of farmers blocking the border roads of Delhi was estimated at 150 to 300 thousand. Despite demands for immediate talks, the centre chalked out 3 December 2020 as the date. Further the Prime Minister would not be present and only select farm unions were invited. This select invitation caused some unions to refuse to attend the meeting. One of the demands of the centre was that the farmers move to a designated protest site in Burari, while the farmers wanted to protest at Jantar Mantar in central Delhi.

Effigies of PM Modi and leaders of corporations were set on fire and prominent personalities began announcing their plans to return their awards received from the Central Government. This was followed by more strikes and talks between the central government and farmer and their unions. A day before the strike on 8 December, the farmer's union announced that it would hold the strike between 11 am and 3 pm alone to avoid inconveniencing the public. On 9 December 2020, the farmers' unions rejected the government's proposals for changes in-laws, even as the Centre in a written proposal assured the minimum support price for crops. On 26 January 2021, Republic Day, thousands protested in Delhi, where tractor rallies and a storming of the historic Red Fort took place.

==== Blocking of borders and roads ====
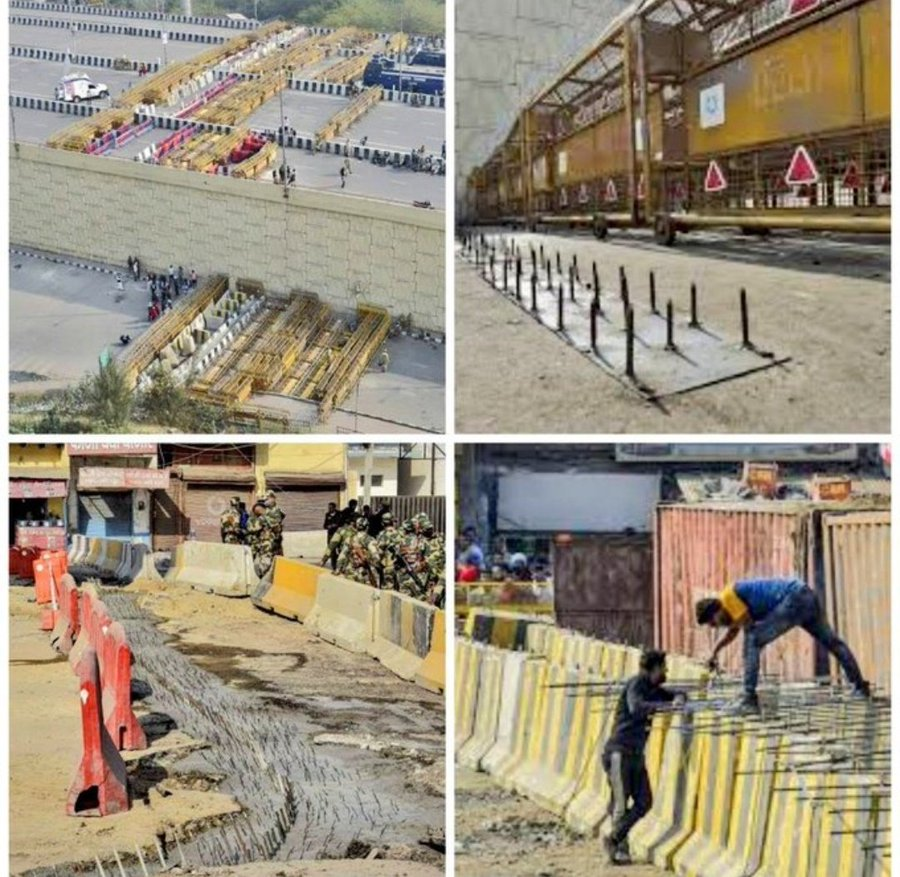
Police blocking roads during Indian farmer protest

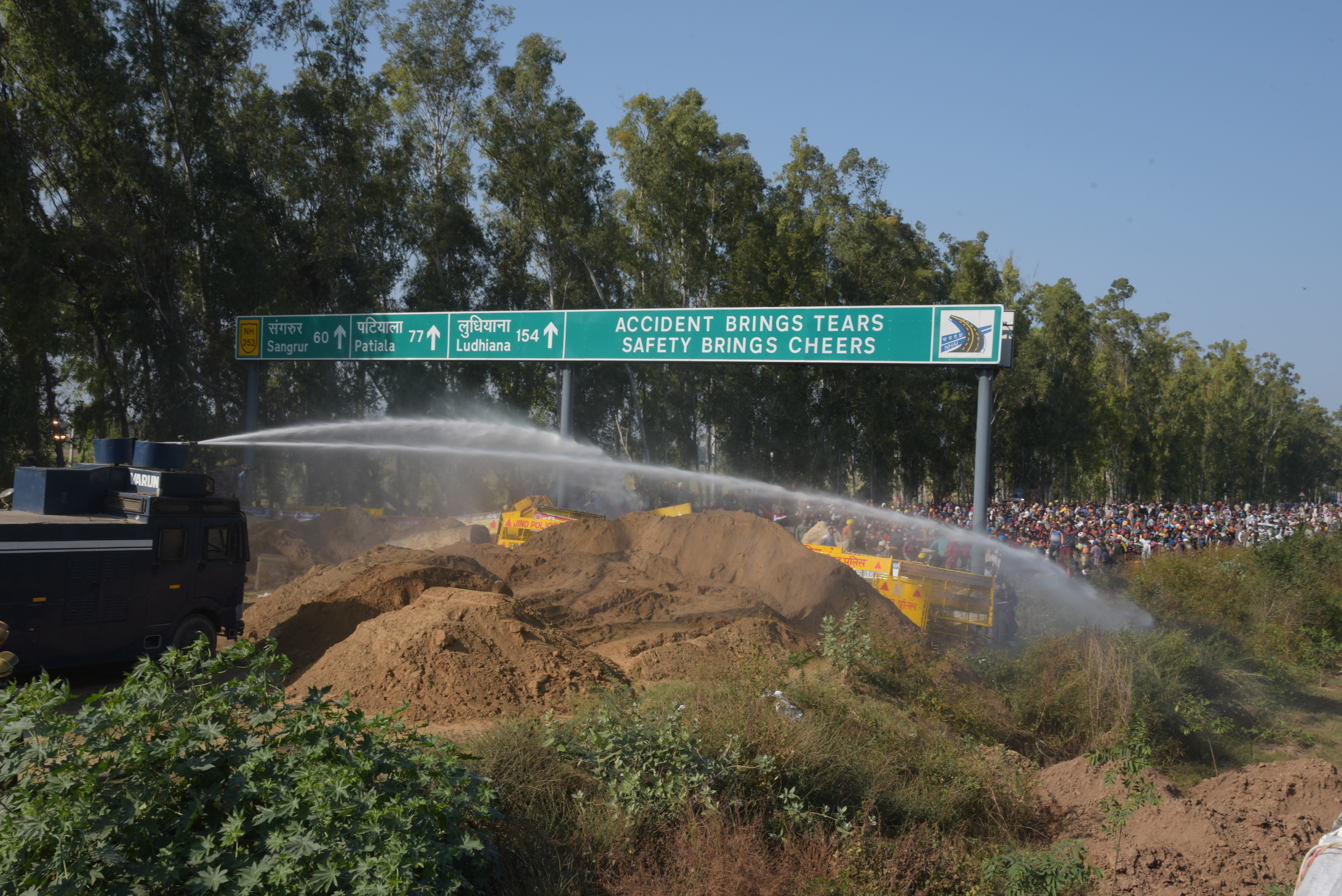
Roadblock before Sangrur

Affected borders and locations due to the farmer protests around Delhi

A number of borders, including the Kundli Border, Dhansa border, Jharoda Kalan border, Tikri border, Singhu border, Kalindi Kunj border, Chilla border, Bahadurgarh border and Faridabad border, were blocked by protesters during the protests. On 29 November, the protesters announced that they would block five further points of entry into Delhi, namely Ghaziabad-Hapur, Rohtak, Sonipat, Jaipur and Mathura. This resulted in minor clashes involving stone pelting and lathi charges with the police. In early February 2021, metal barricades, cement walls and iron nails were put up at the roads leading to the three main borders (Tikri, Singhu and Ghazipur) to block any vehicles from entering Delhi. Barbed fences were also put up to prevent people from entering Delhi on foot. As of 22 March 2021, a number of Delhi borders remained shut. There are around 40,000 protestors sitting at Singhu and Tikri. Some highways were also blocked in protest.

==== Counter-protests ====
The Shetkari Sanghatana, a farmers' union in Maharashtra, supports the bills and wants the market to decide the prices of agricultural commodities. It claims that the minimum support prices have actually weakened farmers, instead of empowering them. The Sanghatana demands that the government stops intervening in the agricultural commodity market so that farmers will not have to depend on the minimum support prices.

On 24 December, 20,000 Kisan Sena members marched to Delhi in support of farm laws. However, five of the groups supporting the laws were directly linked with the ruling party and many do not have any relation to agriculture or farmers.

On 28 January 2021, the residents of the border villages which the farmers occupied, staged protests to make farmers vacate the sites as it affected their commute. They also accused the farmers for disrespecting the Indian flag at Red Fort.

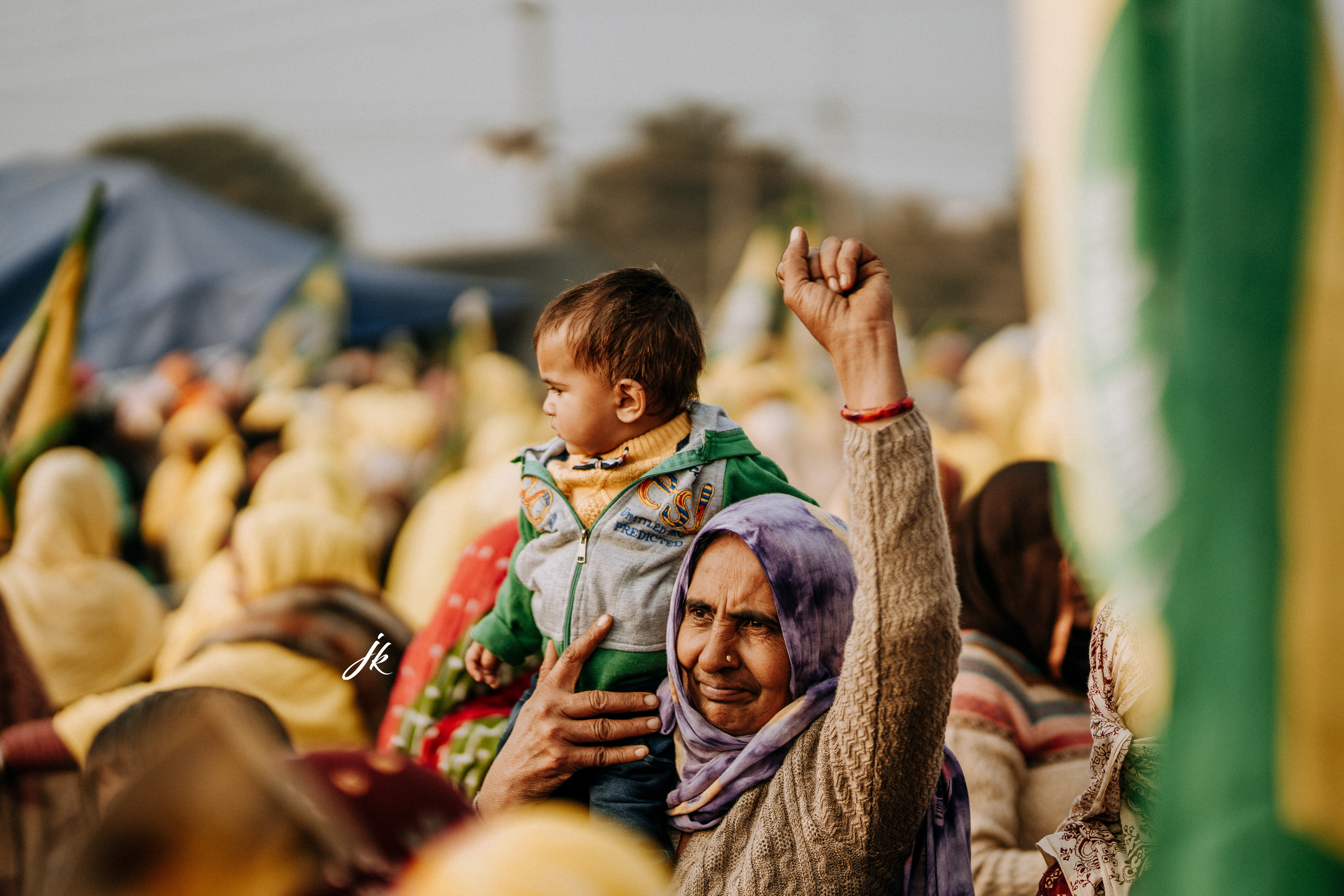
18 January 2021

=== 2021 ===
==== Republic Day Kisan Parade ====
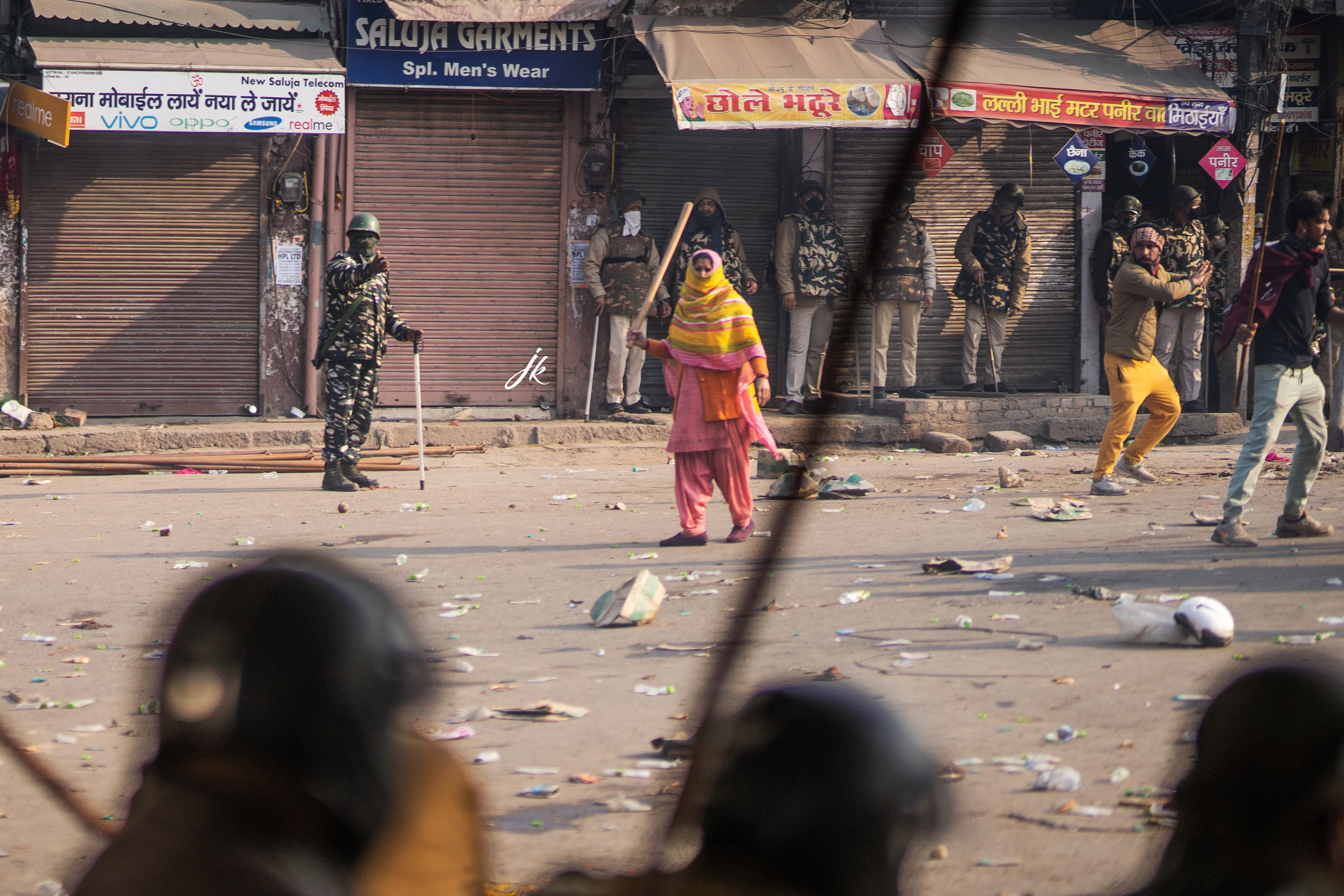
26 January 2021

On 26 January, tens of thousands of the farmers protesting agricultural reforms held a parade with a large convoy of tractors and drove into Delhi. The farmers drove in long lines of tractors, riding horses or marching on foot. The parade started from Singhu Border, Tikri Border and Ghazipur in Delhi on the routes approved by the Police. The farmers were barred from entering the central part of the city where the official Republic Day parade was taking place. At the Singhu Border starting point, according to the police estimates, around 7000 tractors had gathered. Reuters reported citing farmers' unions that close to 200,000 tractors had participated.

At around 8 am, a few hours early from the permitted time, farmers started to gather separately at Ghazipur, Singhu, and Tikri borders. The tractor rally commenced from the Singhu border and was designated to follow a decided route. However, as the rally progressed, it deviated and marched towards other routes. The protestors marched towards ITO metro station and the city centre, and broke through the barricades. The Delhi Police used tear gas and baton charged the protesting farmers leading to clashes. Several metro stations were closed and mobile internet was suspended by police.

The protestors entered the Red Fort of Delhi, and one of the farmers was seen climbing a flagpole in front of the fort and hoisting the religious flag Nishan Sahib on the flagpole. The clash between police and farmers also caused damage to facilities inside the fort. 394 policemen were reported injured, 30 police vehicles were damaged and internet services were suspended for hours in several parts of Delhi and the NCR region. The police took hours in vacating the fort premises after continuous announcements and use of force.

After the 26 January tractor march, the police constructed cement barricades, dug trenches and cemented nails at all three borders where farmers continue to protest. The barricading and police has restricted movement of locals, farmers, as well as journalists to the protest sites. At the Ghazipur border, farmer leaders alleged that water and electricity supply was cut off.

As of 28 January, the Delhi Police stated that it has filed various criminal cases on the incidents of violence and arrested several people. More than 300 police personnel were injured in the violence by protesters who used batons and sharp weapons. The violence and hoisting of a religious flag on the ramparts of the Red Fort made the Bharatiya Kisan Union (Bhanu) and All India Kisan Sangharsh Co-ordination Committee decide to quit the farmers' protest. Sharad Pawar, the leader of the Nationalist Congress Party, and Captain Amarinder Singh, the Chief Minister of Punjab, condemned the violence. One person died in the protest as his tractor overturned on him. Later, the postmortem also confirmed that he died due to haemorrhage due to head injuries.

==== Impact of COVID-19 pandemic ====
Protestors at the protest sites around Delhi decreased following the second wave of the COVID-19 pandemic; however, this has also been attributed to the harvest season. Different kinds of narratives were in circulation at the farmers' protest camps near the Singhu border connecting Haryana and Delhi. Some conspiracy theories endorsed the belief that the pandemic was a rumor spread by the forces of the government to scare the farmers back into their homes in the name of practicing social distancing. Other stories, however, resisted the pandemic governance while rooting for the farmers' protests with the argument that the pandemic might be real, but not strong enough to affect the farmers who have endured worse in life.

==== Following protests ====
On 3 February, farmer leaders warned of escalating the protest to overthrowing the government if the farm laws were not repealed. A peaceful anti-farm law protest is attacked in Bihar. On 21 March specific mention was made of Bengaluru, "...you (farmers) have to turn Bengaluru into Delhi. You will have to lay siege to the city from all directions". As of 21 March 2021, according to Haryana Police, there are around 40,000 committed protestors sitting at Singhu and Tikri at the Delhi border.

The SKM has planned that 200 farmers will protest outside the Parliament every day during the monsoon session starting from 22 July 2021. On 5 September 2021, a farmers' mahapanchayat was held in Muzaffarnagar. On 22 July, they started a sit-in at Jantar Mantar, a large Mughal-era observatory near the Parliament.

On 5 September, more than 500,000 farmers attended a demonstration rally in the city of Muzaffarnagar, Uttar Pradesh.

On 27 September, farmer unions called a Bharat Bandh. The bandh had limited nation-wide impact. A protest on 3 October 2021 in Lakhimpur Kheri resulted in a number of deaths.

In November 2021, farmers stopped the screening of a movie in five cinema halls in Hoshiarpur, disgruntled that Akshay Kumar had not come out in support. A farmer's protest on 5 November turned violent and a MP's car window was smashed.

A tractor march to Parliament on 29 November 2021 was suspended. The unions made clear that the protest was not ending.

In late November 2021, the Modi administration finally repealed all three farm bills. However, protests would continue until 11 December 2021, when the protests were finally declared over and the farmers started returning to their homes.

== Organization ==
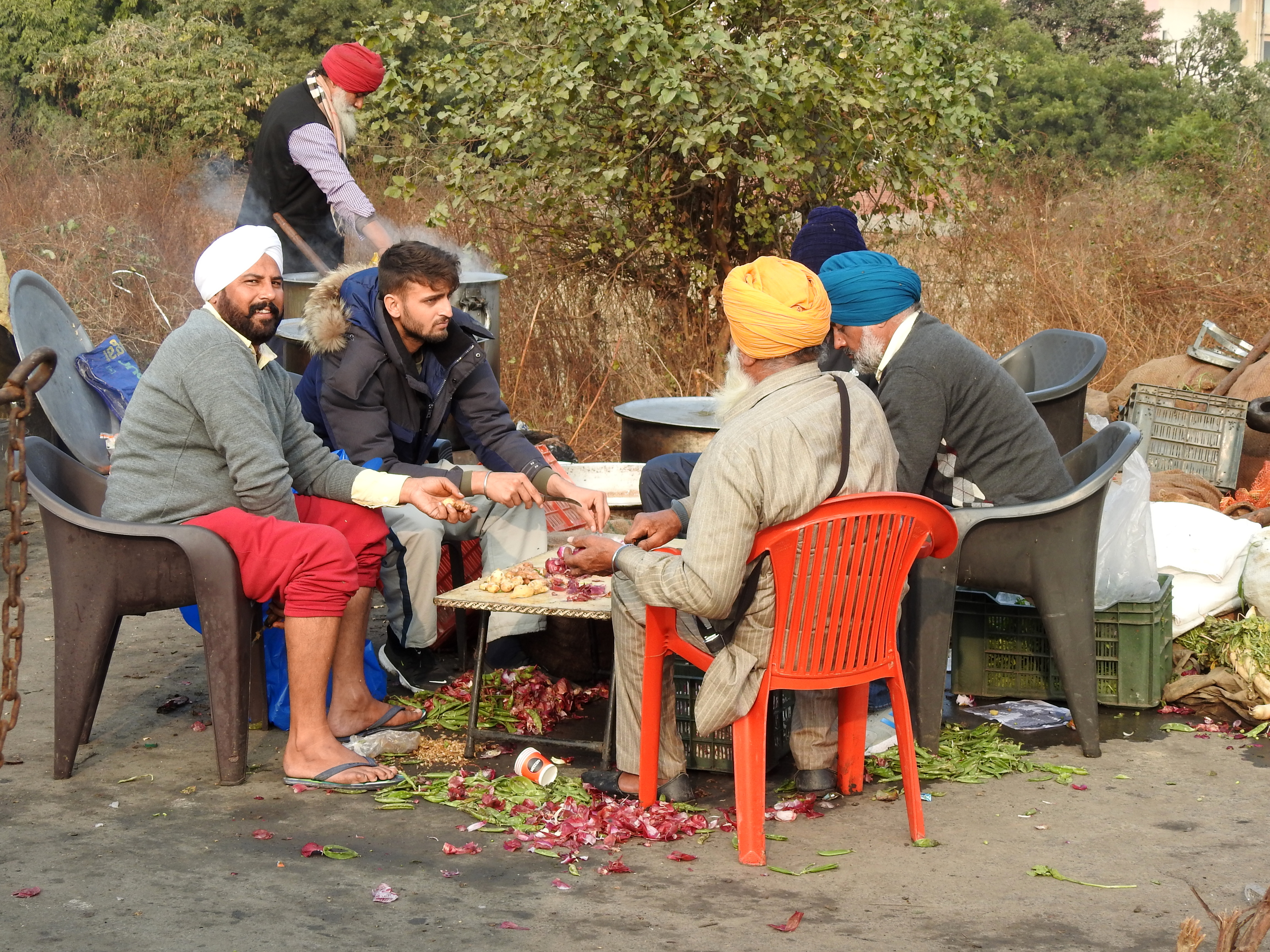
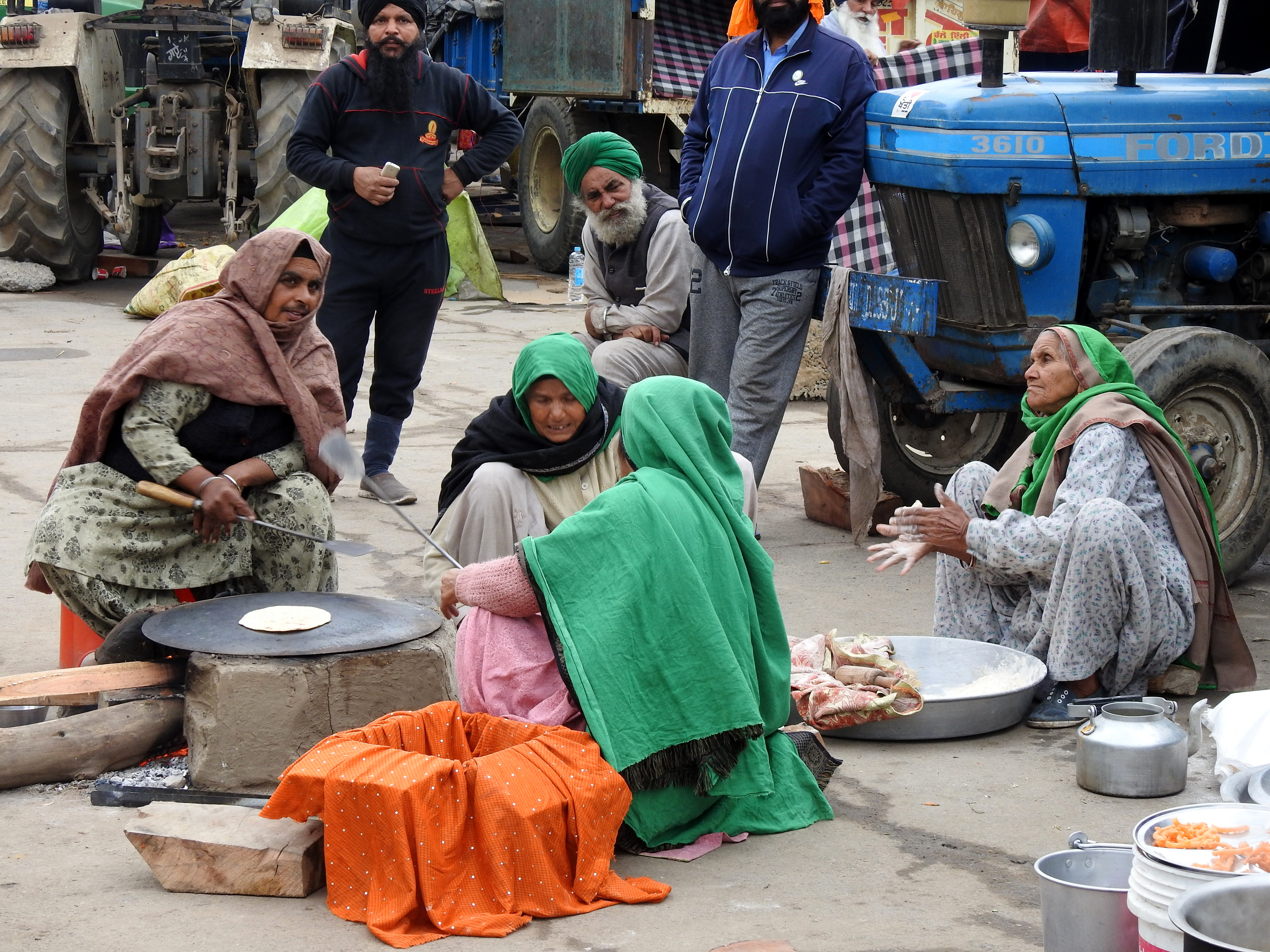
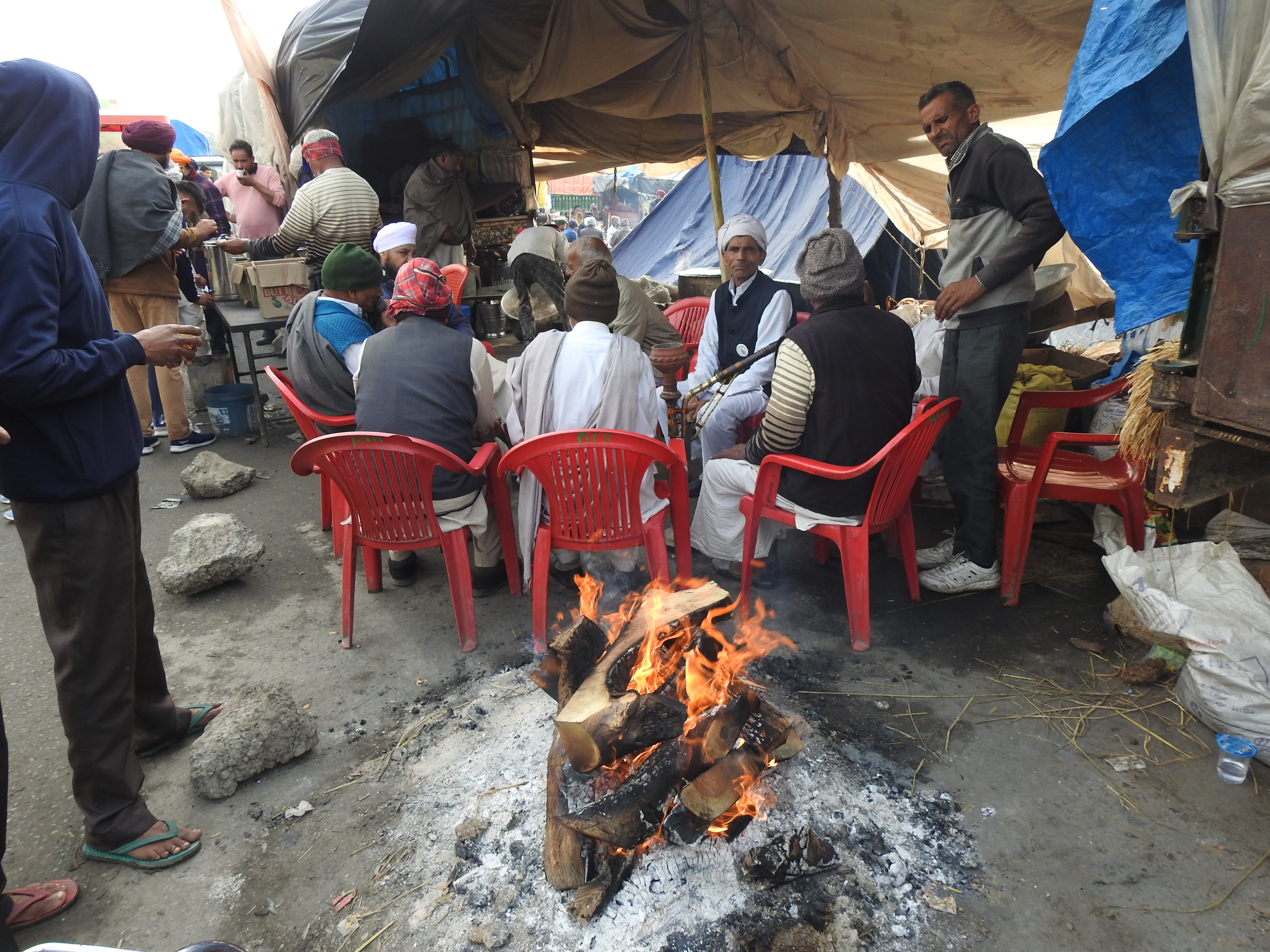
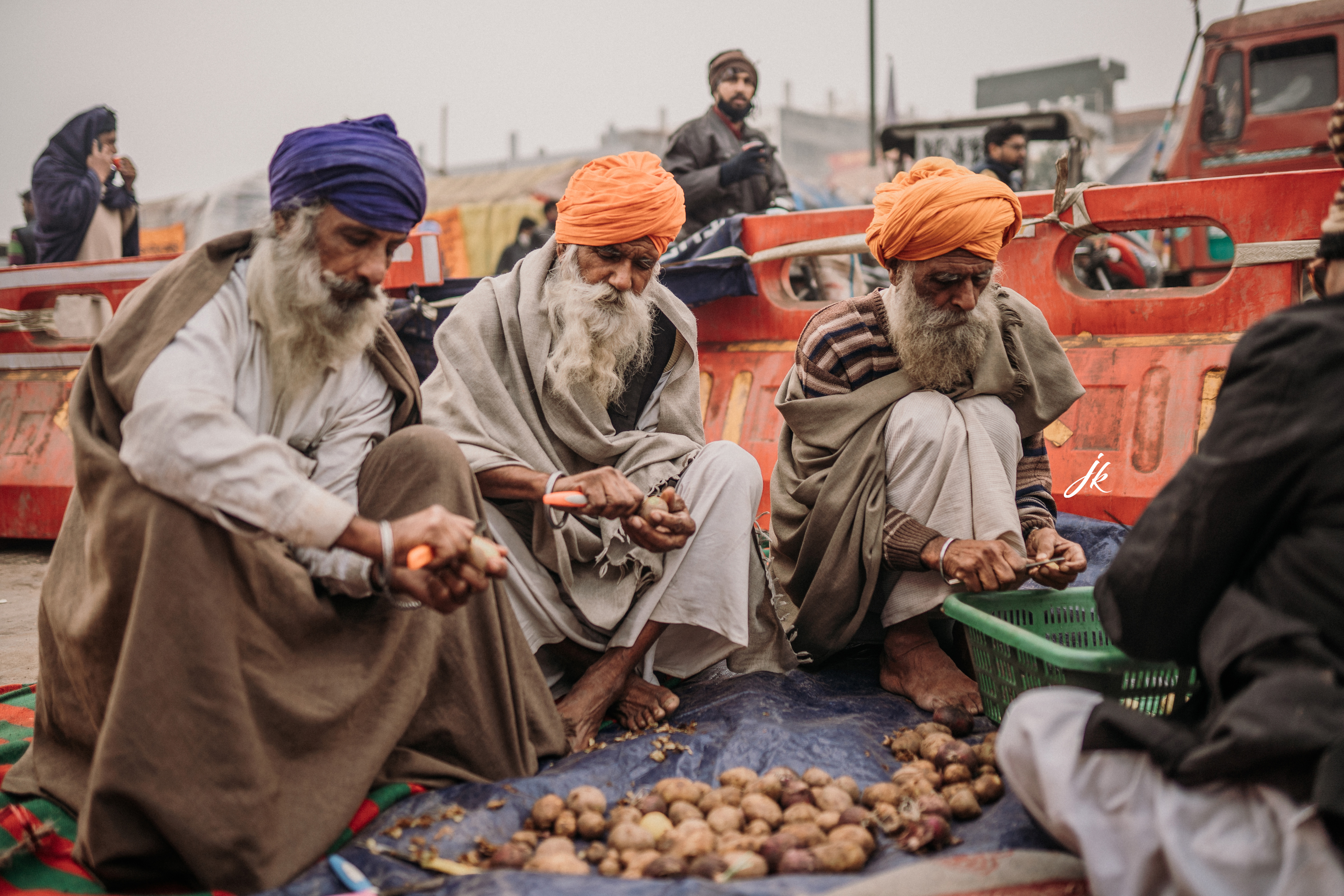
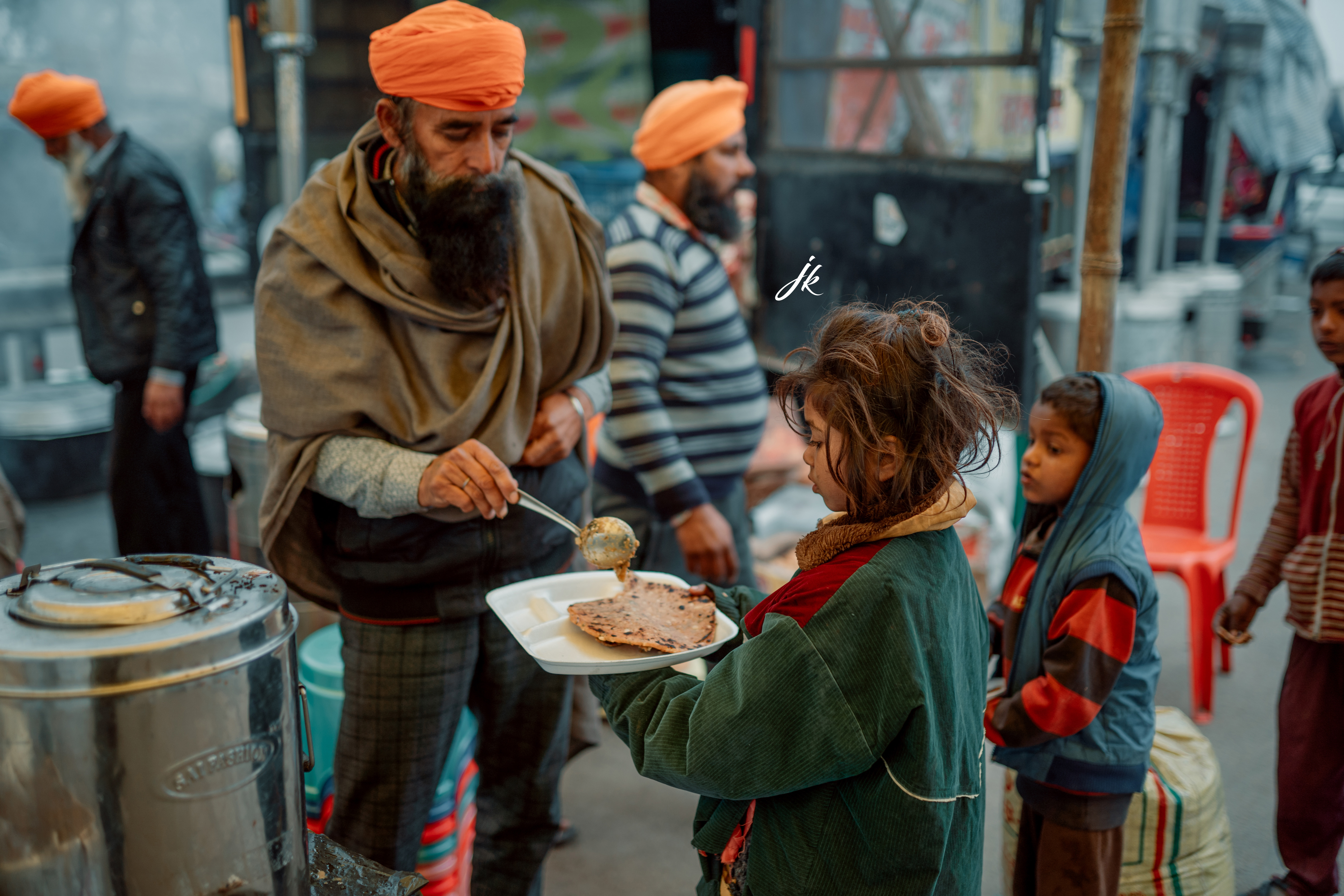
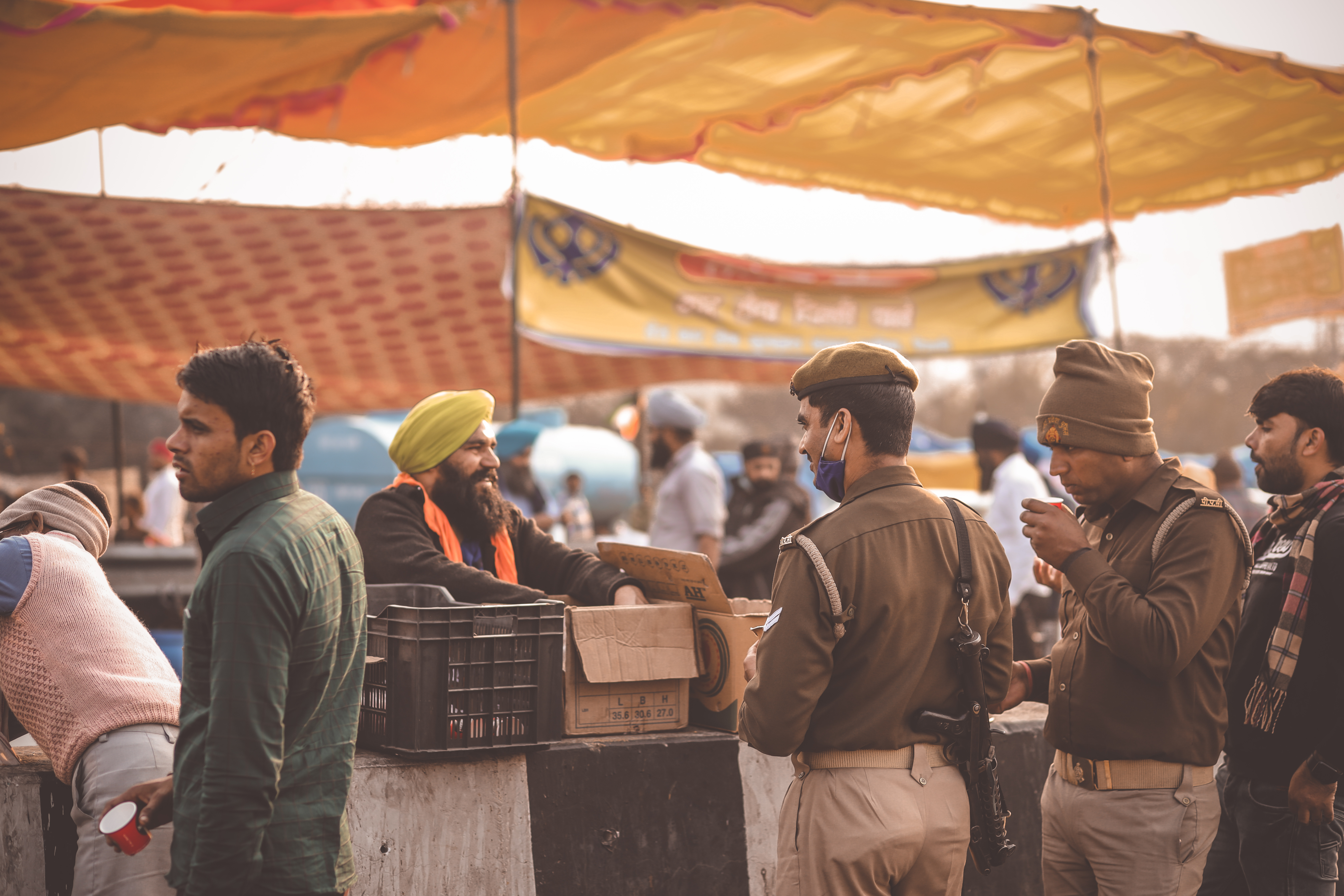
Visuals from a section of the protests, including from the Singhu border

=== Langars ===
Scores of langars and makeshift kitchens were deployed by farmer's organizations and NGOs to meet the food needs of the tens of thousands of farmers in the farmers-camps that sprung up on the borders of Delhi after the Delhi Police barred the farmers from entering the city on 26 November 2020. These langars worked round the clock and provided free food to protesters. The hot meals provided by the langars included pizzas, lentils, seasonal vegetables, roti, buttermilk, and tea. Media outlets made significant coverage on some aspects of the langars, such as the use of mechanical roti makers which can cook 1000 roti an hour, or when farmers were seen eating pizzas at the Singhu border, which drew mockery of the farmer's movement. Also videos of farmers surfaced distributing liquor at the protest site.The media also highlighted farmer's consumption of dried fruits and nuts such as cashews and raisins at an "almond langar" . Organizations engaged in setting up and running langars include Delhi Sikh Gurdwara Committee at Singhu border; Baba Kashmir Singh ji Bhuriwale sect, Tikri border; Khalsa Aid; Dera Baba Jagtar Singh from Tarn Taran, Delhi based Jamindara Student Organisation; Gurdwara Head Darbar Kot Puran, Ropar, Muslim Federation of Punjab, and several others, including NRI-NGOs which have pitched in with aid in kind. Along with the langars, a makeshift school has been set up at the camp, mostly for children who are unable to attend school due to financial issues and the ongoing COVID-19 pandemic.

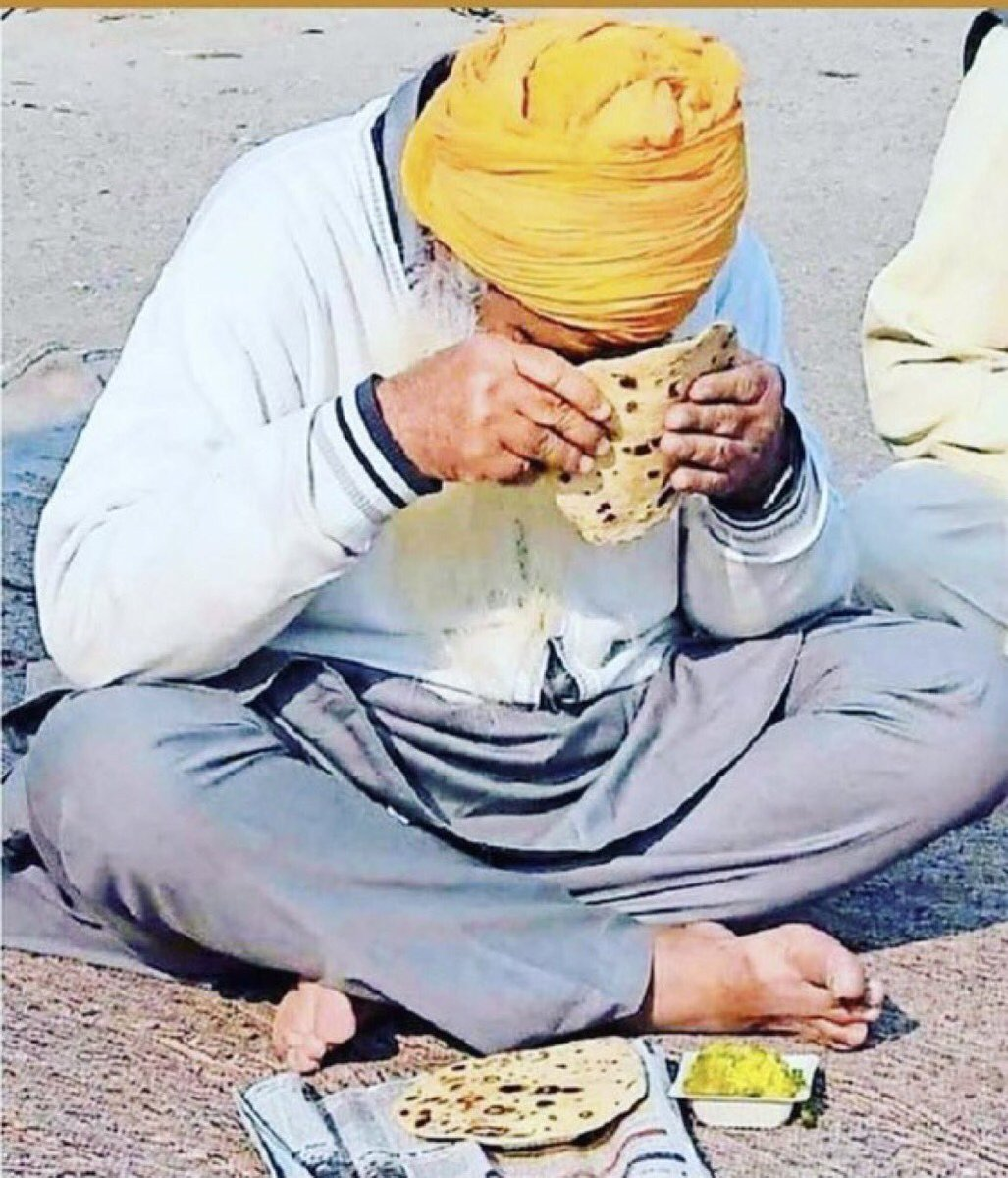
A farmer protestor praying before eating his food

=== Accommodation and supplies ===
In addition to food, and tea, the farmers in the camps, are being supported by domestic and international NGOs, including UK based controversial NGO Khalsa Aid, with provisions of tents, solar-powered mobile charging points, air conditioners, televisions, laundry, library, medical stalls, dental camp, which did tooth retraction, cleaning, filling, and scaling treatments, foot massage chairs for protesters.

=== Security and control ===
At the Singhu border, farmers have installed eight CCTV cameras to keep a watch on the protest site, "[...] since there are so many people coming in now. We come to know of incidents where people with ulterior motives try to create problems. This way, we can keep a record of what is happening and counter any narrative to blame us for any anti-social activity," said a farmer from Sanyukt Kisan Morcha's CCTV department.

=== Healthcare ===
Doctor Swaiman Singh was doing a fellowship with Newark Beth Israel Medical Center when he heard of the death of someone close at the farmer protest in December 2020. He planned to provide services at the protest sites on the outskirts of the capital territory for just a few weeks, but ended up spending a number of months. Through his non-government organisation, a large team of doctors are available at the protest sites periodically. Volunteers also turned out to help with the needs of the free medical camps such as transporting supplies.

== Fatalities ==
On 20 December 2020, the day the farmer's collectively condoled the deaths of farmers, the death toll was 41. On 30 December 2020, it was over 50. On 2 January 2021, the estimate of dead-farmers had reached 57. On 8 January 2021, the week following the onset of winter rains, death toll of farmers including death by suicide during farmer's satyagraha, according to leaders of the farmer's movement, had crossed 120. As of 5 March 2021, 248 farmers were confirmed dead. Samyukt Kisan Morcha has stated that until 10 July 2021 over 537 participants have died in the protest. In October and November 2021, BKU leader Rakesh Tikait stated that around 750 protestors had died.

=== 2020 ===
The first farmer to die was Dhanna Singh (age 45) of Mansa district in Punjab. He was a leader of the Bharatiya Kisan Union (Dakaunda). He died, on the night of 26 November 2020, according to farmer leaders and media reports, while trying to negotiate his tractor past the Haryana Police road barricade of sand-laden trucks and stones. He was on his way to join the farmers who had been stopped by the Delhi Police on 26 November, on the border of Haryana, and Delhi.

On 20 December, the death toll of farmers for the period 15 September to 20 December, according to media reports, was 41. Of these 38 were from Punjab (30 from Malwa, six from Doaba, and two from Majha), and three from Haryana. This total includes seven farmers who have died due to the cold and heart attacks at the Tikri border, and six at Singhu border, including Sant Baba Ram Singh, who committed suicide on 16 December. In the period 26 November – 18 December, according to Manoj Yadava, Director-General of Police, Haryana, 25 farmers died (heart attacks and cold 14, accident 10, suicide 1). This estimate however did not match with the estimated deaths in the 'struggle' by Dr Darshan Pal, the farmer leader, according to whom the death toll of farmers in the 'struggle' during this period is 35.

Piara Singh, a 70-year-old poor farmer, and member of BKU (Dakaunda) died on 29 December, of pneumonia, in a Sangrur private hospital. Piara Singh, according to his elder brother, was part of the contingent participating in the farmer's-satyagraha since 26 November. Other farmers cremated on 29 December included Amarjeet Singh Rai in Jalalabad, and farm laborer Malkiat Kaur of Mazdoor Mukti Morcha in Mansa, Punjab.

=== 2021 ===
On 1 January 2021, Galtan Singh, 57, of Baghpat, UP, who was part of the protesters at Ghazipur border, died after complaining of breathlessness. He became the first farmer fatality of 2021, and first reported farmer-death on the UP border. On 2 January, three farmers died: two at the Tikri Border, and one at the Singhu border. In Tikri Jagbir Singh, 66, from Jind district, died of suspected heart-attack; and Jashnpreet, 18, from Bathinda, died after he was evacuated to after evacuation to PGIMS, Rohtak. Shamsher Singh, 44, a dalit farmer, who was in Singhu camp with his son, 13, died after he complained of chest pain, before reaching the hospital in Soneput, Haryana.

Navreet Singh, 25, resident of Rampur district, a student of Melbourne University on vacation in India, died while participating in farmers' Republic Day tractor rally on 26 January 2021. He was the lone fatality during the farmer's rally. According to Delhi Police First Information Report (FIR), and the autopsy, Navreet Singh died from head injuries sustained in a tractor accident. Avinash Chandra, Additional Director General of Police (DGP) Bareilly Zone, whose jurisdiction includes Rampur, told reporters that the postmortem report has confirmed that Navreet Singh was not shot, and succumbed to antemortem injuries "received after his tractor toppled". Navreet Singh's grandfather, Hardeep Singh Dibdiba, with whom he was staying, and other family members, have denied police version of events. They allege that Navneet Singh died from gunshot wounds from firing by Delhi police . Journalists who reported these allegations were charged with sedition by the Uttar Pradesh police. Those charged include Siddharth Varadarajan, Mrinal Pande, Rajdeep Sardesai, Vinod Jose, Zafar Agha, Paresh Nath and Anant Nath, and Shashi Tharoor, Congress MP Varadarajan has called the police FIR "malicious prosecution".

A freelance journalist, Mandeep Punia, was arrested by Delhi Police on 30 January in view of his reports regarding the violence that took place at Singhu border the day before. He was granted bail on 2 February.

On 3 October, during the Lakhimpur Kheri massacre, eight farmers were killed and several injured after they were run over by an SUV from the convoy of the Union Minister of State for Home Affairs Ajay Kumar Mishra (of BJP) during a black flag protest at Tikunia in UP's Lakhimpur Kheri. Following the incident, some protesting farmers set the SUV and one other vehicle on fire and lynched 4 people to death including three BJP members and a driver. The son of Ajay Mishra, Ashish Mishra, was alleged to be the driver behind the ramming attack and was interrogated and arrested on 9 October.

=== Suicides ===
As of 9 January 2021, the death toll of farmers by suicide to protest the government's farm policy was five. Sant Baba Ram Singh, a Sikh priest, shot himself on 16 December 2020 at the Singhu border in protest against the farm laws. According to J.S. Randhawa, Senior Superintendent of Police, Sonepat, Haryana, Ram Singh left behind a 10-page note, dated 14 December, and a handwritten suicide letter, dated 16 December 2020, in which he wrote that he could not bear the pain of the farmers. At his funeral on 18 December, in Karnal, attended by farmer leaders, religious heads, and Shiromani Gurudwara Parbandhak Committee chief Bibi Jagir Kaur, the suicide letter was read out, which said, "Bullets fired from the guns kill only those whom they strike. The bullet of injustice, however, kills many with a single stroke... It is humiliating to suffer injustice."

On 18 December, according to Joginder Singh Jawanda, BKU (Ugrahan) leader, a heavily indebted 22-year-old Punjab farmer killed himself with poison in his village after returning from Singhu, the protest site on the Delhi border. On 27 December, Amarjit Singh Rai, a lawyer, committed suicide by taking poison. Rai before he took his life wrote in a note that he was "sacrificing his life" in support of farmer's protest, and urged Prime Minister Narendra Modi to "listen to the voice of the people".

2 January 2021, Kashmir Singh Ladi, 75-year-old farmer from Bilaspur, Rampur district, Uttar Pradesh (UP), committed suicide. He was the fourth farmer suicide since the farm protesters were stopped on 26 November 2020, by UP Police on Delhi-UP Ghazipur Border, also called UP gate. Kashmir Singh who had been camping at the border since 28 November along with his son, and grandson, hanged himself in a toilet. Ladi, according to a government official, left a note in Punjabi, that says, "Till when shall we sit here in the cold? This government isn't listening at all. Hence, I give up my life so that some solution emerges."

On 9 January 2021, it was reported that Amrinder Singh, a 40-year-old Punjabi farmer, had killed himself by swallowing aluminium phosphide tablets at the Singhu border. The man had been depressed at the state of the negotiations and had downed the tablets at a stage set up for protesters to speak, whereupon he was rushed to the hospital, but they were unable to resuscitate him.

=== Homage to the dead ===
On 20 December, the 25th day of the protest, to honour the memory of 41 farmers who have died since 15 September, called shahid by the farmer's leaders, national 'Shradhanjali Diwas' (Homage and Remembrance Day), was observed at Singhu, Tikri, UP Gate, and Chilla, farmer-camps with largest farmer's presence on the borders of Delhi, and in town and villages all-round the country. According to Sukhdev Singh Kokrikalan, general secretary of BKU (Ugrahan) simultaneous events were organized in 98 villages in 15 Punjab districts, on 20 December, to honour the dead. These commemorations continued until 24 December.

On 4 January 2021, on the insistence of farmer's leaders, government ministers and officials of National Democratic Alliance Government participated in two-minute silence during the seventh round of talks between the government and farmers leaders held in Vigyan Bhavan, New Delhi. On 11 February 2021, Rahul Gandhi, in the Loka Sabha proposed that the house observe two minutes silence for farmers who had died during the protests.

== Response and reactions ==
=== Domestic ===
On 17 September, the Food Processing Industries Union Minister, Harsimrat Kaur Badal of Shiromani Akali Dal, resigned from her post in protest against the bills. On 26 September, Shiromani Akali Dal left the National Democratic Alliance. On 1 December, Independent MLA Somveer Sangwan withdrew support from the Bharatiya Janata Party government in the Haryana Assembly. The BJP's ally, the Jannayak Janta Party (JJP) also asked the central government to consider giving a "written assurance of the continuation of Minimum Support Price (MSP) for crops."

On 30 November, PM Modi raised concerns over the issue of misled and radicalized farmers. He stated that "the farmers are being deceived on these historic agriculture reform laws by the same people who have misled them for decades", citing numerous times opposition members were convicted of spreading lies. Modi added that the old system was not being replaced, but instead, that new options were being put forward for the farmers. Several Union Ministers also made statements to this effect. On 17 December, the Minister of Agriculture & Farmers Welfare wrote an open letter to farmers over the new laws.

==== Talks between Government of India and farmers ====
Ten rounds of talks have taken place between the Centre and farmers (represented by farm unions) until 20 January 2021. The first round of talks were on 14 October 2020 in which the farmers walked out on finding that the agriculture secretary was present but not the minister. The meeting on 4 January was attended by three Union Ministers – agriculture minister Narendra Singh Tomar, and commerce ministers Piyush Goyal and Som Parkash. The three Union Ministers declined the requests of scrapping the three new farm laws as it required more consultation with higher authorities. It is reported that the two sides have managed to reach an agreement on only two issues which the farmers are concerned by, the rise in power tariffs and penalties for stubble burning. Farmer leaders also rejected a government proposal, dated 21 January 2021, of suspending the laws for 18 months.

==== Failure of government communication ====
A number of experts have commented on the failure and lack of the governments communication with regard to informing farmers and political allies about the importance of the farm bills. Farm reforms have been mentioned in both BJP and Congress manifestos.

According to an economist, Ashok Gulati, noted that there has been a "communication failure on the part of the central government to explain to farmers what these laws are, and how they are intended to benefit them", further arguing that this communication gap was fully exploited by some political parties and social activists, who are against the Narendra Modi government, and subsequently a massive misinformation campaign was launched about these laws being a sell-out to corporate houses, will abolish the MSP system. A Bloomberg columnist noted that "What's at risk isn't just a couple of laws, but India's commitment to the transition to a more environmentally sustainable and equitable growth model", asserting that farmers' demands that unsustainable practices continue are similar to France's gilets jaunes protest demands.

==== Violence by Nihangs ====
On 15 October 2021, Lakhbir Singh from Tarn Taran district of Punjab, India was killed near the farmer's protest site at Delhi's Singhu border by Nihang Sikhs on suspicion of sacrilege of the Sikh holy book. The killing began with the victim's hand and a leg being chopped off, and later his body was hanged on a barricade near the farmers’ protest site. A Nihang Sikh group took responsibility for the killing after the man committed sacrilege of their holy scripture.

Following the 2021 Singhu border lynching of an alleged desecrater, a Nihang accepted his role in the murder and courted arrest the same day, while the second accused, who also belongs to the Nihang group, was arrested by the Amritsar police. The wife of one of the Nihangs involved said "he did the right thing". A United Akali Dal spokesperson commented on the incident, "In my view, this justice is correct... we cannot tolerate sacrilege".

==== Incidents of fake news ====
Several politicians have circulated misinformation and fake news about the protests, and based on this, have made allegations of separatism, sedition, and 'anti-national' activities concerning the farmers' protests. In response to these, in December 2020, a group of protesting farmers announced that they would be establishing a unit to counter misinformation being spread about the protests. Notable incidents of fake news include:

- The general secretary of the BJP, Dushyant Kumar Gautam, alleged slogans of "Khalistan Zindabad" and "Pakistan Zindabad" being used during the protests. On 28 November, the Haryana Chief Minister Manohar Lal Khattar said that "unwanted elements" like radical Khalistan sympathizers have been seen among the peacefully and democratically protesting farmers. However, fact checks conducted by news outlet India Today as well as non-profit fact checking website, Alt News, both indicated that old images from a 2013 protest were being used to make false claims about Khalistani separatism during the farmers protests. Protesters also have accused the national media of not telling the truth in relation to the laws. A protester told Scroll.in that "The Modi media is calling us Khalistanis [...] We have been sitting peacefully for two-month. That make us terrorists?" Commentators have said that the Khalistan angle is being used to defame the protests. The Editors Guild of India asked the media not label protesting farmers as "Khalistanis" or "anti-nationals" saying that "This goes against the tenets of responsible and ethical journalism. Such actions compromise the credibility of the media."
- In December 2020, Bharatiya Janata Party IT Cell's head, Amit Malviya, shared a misleading and fake video regarding the farmers' protests, claiming that there had been no police violence, in response to evidence of police violence shared by Congress politician Rahul Gandhi. Twitter flagged Malviya's video as 'manipulated media', placing a warning below the tweet to indicate that the content shared by Malviya was "deceptively altered or fabricated" with the intention of misleading people.
- A tweet by Canadian MP Jack Harris in support of the protest was falsely attributed to American Vice-president-elect Kamala Harris. Harris released a statement clarifying that she had not made the statement.
- The BJP's Punjab unit shared an advertisement containing what they claimed was of a 'happy farmer' supporting the new laws. The image was actually of a protesting farmer, who had not consented to their use of his image. After he publicly objected and filed a legal notice against the Punjab BJP, the image was replaced with a cartoon drawing of a farmer instead.
- Priti Gandhi, the social media for the BJP's Women's Cell, shared an image of farmers allegedly protesting the change to the state of Kashmir's constitutional status in 2019. This image was not taken during the farmers' protest, but was from a protest held in 2019 by the Shiromani Akali Dal political party.
- Several BJP politicians, including Union Minister Giriraj Singh, shared a video of police officials removing the turban of a Sikh protester, and falsely claimed that the protester was not Sikh but was in fact Muslim, and further claimed that this was evidence of Muslims instigating protests. This video had previously been shared during the 2019 Citizenship Act protests and was debunked as fake then, despite which it was shared again during the 2020 farmers' protests to raise allegations against Muslim citizens.
- In January 2021, a user generated National Geographic Magazine cover was circulated as a real cover depicting the farmers' protest as the cover story.
- In January 2021, several BJP leaders, including Jawahar Yadav, and Facebook fan pages of Prime Minister Narendra Modi accused protesting farmers of vandalizing signboards on highways, sharing images of such signboards. The images were later established as being taken from old news articles covering protests in 2017 about the placement of Punjabi language signs on these boards.
- Rajdeep Sardesai spread a fake news story of a farmer being killed by Delhi Police during the violence of the tractor parade on 26 January. India Today took the noted media personality off air and deducted one months pay for his unverified remarks.
- In January 2021, Zee News aired a video of decorated tractors, claiming that it was evidence of a forthcoming protest by farmers, and commenting, "Why use such tractors of terror in the farmer protests? Are these tractors a means of waging war with the law? Are these farmers' tractors or terror tractors?". The video in question contained persons speaking in German and was confirmed as having been taken from a rally conducted in Germany in December 2020, in which tractors were decorated, and displayed to raise funds for children who were being treated for cancer.

==== Allegations of conspiracy ====
Union Minister Piyush Goyal has described the protesting farmers as "Leftist and Maoist" and being "hijacked" by unknown conspirators. Former Rajya Sabha MP and vice-president of BJP in Himachal Pradesh, Kripal Parmar stated, "The protest is driven by vested interest of few anti-national elements." Union Minister and BJP politician Raosaheb Danve has alleged an international conspiracy, claiming that China and Pakistan are behind the ongoing protests by farmers. BJP MLA Surendra Singh said, "....this is a sponsored agitation by anti-national forces and has foreign funding." BJP Uttarakhand chief Dushyant Kumar Gautam stated that the protests had been 'hijacked' by "terrorists" and "anti-national" forces. Several BJP leaders have blamed what they have called the 'Tukde Tukde Gang' – a pejorative term used by the BJP and its supporters, against anyone who disagrees with its politics, which implies that the person supports secession – as instigating the protests, and linked them to previous protests about India's citizenship laws. Delhi BJP MP Manoj Tiwari has accused such unnamed conspirators of instigating the protests, as has Union Minister Ravi Shankar Prasad. In response to the BJP's claims, Sukhbir Singh Badal, former Deputy Chief Minister of Punjab, claimed that the BJP was the real 'Tukde Tukde Gang' and trying to divide Punjab. BJP General Secretary Manoj Tiwari has also described the protesting farmers as "urban naxals". Rajasthan BJP leader Madan Dilawar has accused protesting farmers of "conspiring" to spread avian influenza in India after reports of some cases of avian flu were made in January. Dilawar claimed that protesting farmers were spreading avian influenza by "eating chicken biryani and cashew nuts/almonds" although he did not clarify how these foods and avian influenza are connected.

Opposition to the claims of conspiracy has been voiced from within the BJP and outside it. BJP leader Surjit Singh Jyani, who was part of a committee that negotiated with several farmers unions, vocally opposed the claims, stating, "This type of language should be avoided. We know many farmers groups are left-leaning but branding them tukde tukde gang and anti-national will not end the deadlock." Maharashtra Chief Minister and Shiv Sena leader, Uddhav Thackeray has voiced opposition to the labelling of protesters as "anti-national", pointing to some confusion among BJP leaders about the source of the allegations of conspiracy. He stated, "BJP leaders should decide who farmers are – are they Leftist, Pakistani, or they have come from China." The conspiracy claims have also been opposed by Rajasthan Chief Minister and Congress politician, Ashok Gehlot, who urged the government to come to an "amicable solution" with protesting farmers "...instead of blaming gangs, anti-national elements for these protests."

=== International ===
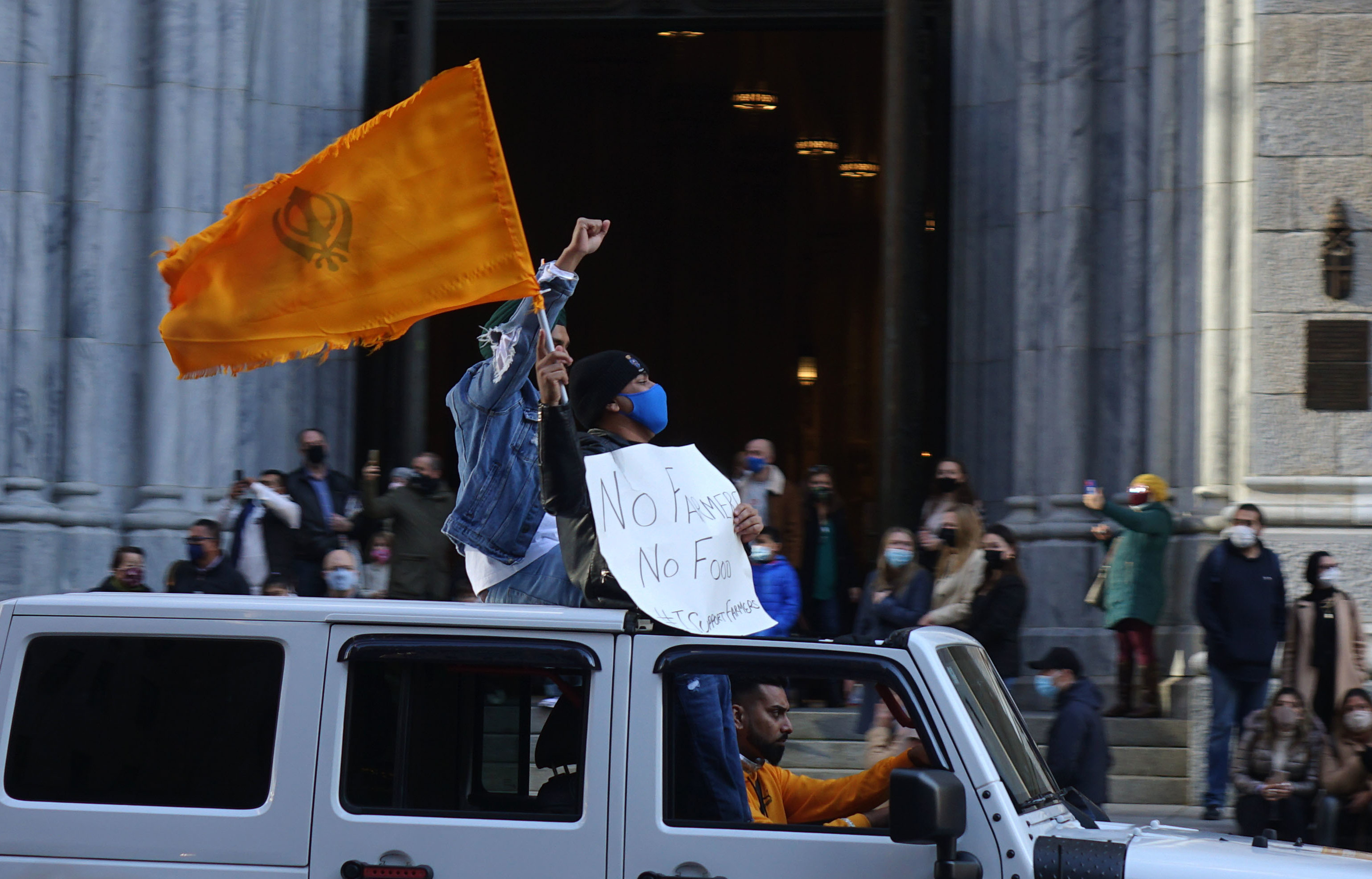
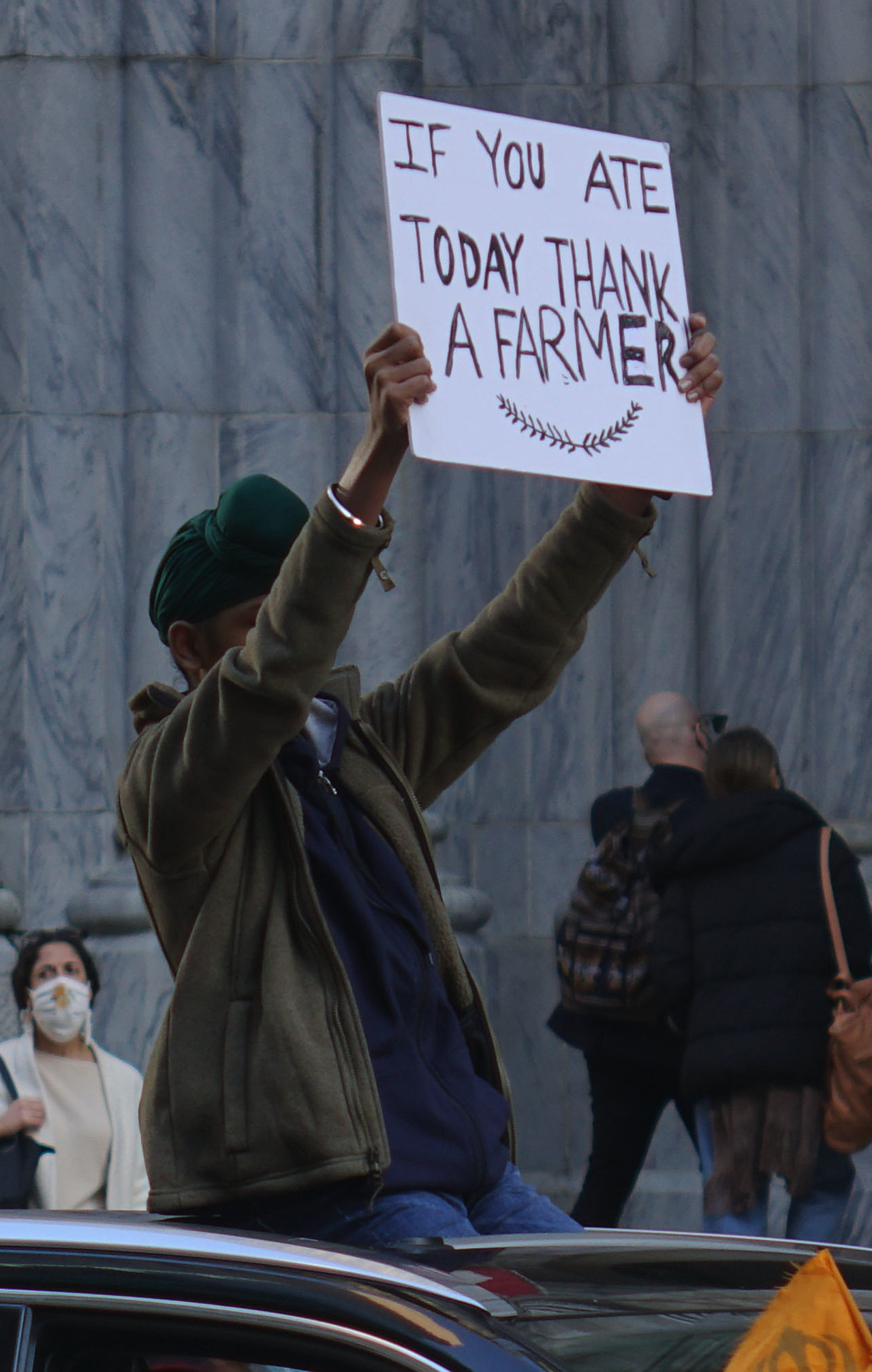
A small scale protest in New York City in support of the farmers in December 2020
- Australia: Victoria Member of Parliament Rob Mitchell and Russell Wortley were among the Labour leaders who spoke in support of the farmers' protests, with Mitchell addressing the Victorian parliament on the subject after several protests were held in Australia by citizens.
- Canada: Justin Trudeau, Prime Minister of Canada expressed concerns about the handling of protests by the Indian government. He was the very first politician on international grounds to speak for the farmers. Trudeau stated that "Canada will always be there to defend the right of peaceful protestors" and expressed support for "the process of dialogue." In response, the Indian Ministry of External Affairs summoned the Canadian High Commissioner to India, Nadir Patel, and issued a démarche, stating that Trudeau's comments were "an unacceptable interference in our internal affairs". Trudeau reiterated his statement despite the Indian Government's warning that his comments threatened diplomatic relations between the two countries. On Saturday, 5 December, hundreds of supporters protested in downtown Toronto and Vancouver, gathering in front of the Indian consulate in both cities to show their support. Organized by members of the Sikh community, the demonstrators stood in solidarity with the farmers and their right to peacefully protest.
- Italy: Indian Ambassador to Italy Neena Malhotra visited a gurudwara in Rome in December as part of an outreach effort by the Indian government to Sikhs amid the farm protests. Malhotra received backlash on social media when the Embassy claimed she had been well received during the visit. However, Malhotra was heckled by members of the gurudwara management committee while she spoke in favor of the new farm laws.
- New Zealand: In early December 2020, 1,500 Indian New Zealanders protested in Auckland's Aotea Square against the new agricultural laws.
- Pakistan: Federal minister Fawad Chaudhry from Punjab, Pakistan, called out the Indian government's behavior with Punjabi farmers and termed it "shameful". He further stated that Modi's policies were "threats for regional peace".
- United Kingdom: Several Labour MPs in the United Kingdom expressed support for the protests and raised concerns about the government response to protesters, including Tanmanjeet Singh Dhesi, Preet Kaur Gill, Claudia Webbe and John McDonnell. A few British MPs and cricketer Monty Panesar also tweeted in support of farmers. In December 2020, a group of 36 British MPs from the Labour, Conservative, Liberal Democrats and Scottish National Party asked the British Foreign Secretary, Dominic Raab, to raise their concerns with the Indian government. The British prime minister Boris Johnson, after being confronted with the issue, confused it with the India–Pakistan conflict, drawing criticism domestically and in India. Nadia Whittome, a British politician, released a statement in support of the farmers.
- United States: Several Indian-American protests were held in support of the farmers, with rallies being held outside Indian consulates in San Francisco, Chicago, Indianapolis, New York City, Houston, Michigan, Atlanta, and Washington, D.C. A rally of over a thousand Indian Americans was also held in Detroit, and a car rally was held in Fort Wayne. Several American Congressmen from both the Republican and Democratic parties voiced support for these protests, including Josh Harder, TJ Cox, Doug LaMalfa, and Andy Levin. In December 2020, seven Congresspersons wrote to the Secretary of State, asking him raise the issue of the farmers' protests with India. The Congressional Research Service published a report on the farmer protests on 1 March. Bob Menendez and Chuck Schumer wrote a letter to the Biden government in relation to the protests, urging it to discuss the farmer issue with the Indian government. On 7 February, Sikh farmers in California's Central Valley funded a 30-second ad which ran during Super Bowl LV in support of the protesters in India. In February 2021, Trevor Noah ran an eight-minute segment on the farm protests.

==== Organisations ====
- United Nations: António Guterres, secretary-general, called on the Indian government to allow the protests, affirming the right to voice opposition to the government, stating "...People have a right to demonstrate peacefully and authorities need to let them do so."
  - International Monetary Fund: Gerry Rice, Director of Communications IMF, said that the agriculture reforms have the potential to represent a significant step forward for agricultural reforms in India. He contended that the bills will eventually reduce middlemen and improve efficiency. He also remarked that a "social safety net" should be there to protect "those who might be adversely impacted during the transition to this new system".
- Human Rights Watch: Human Rights Watch issued a statement on 2 February calling on the Indian government to drop "baseless criminal charges" against journalists covering the protests.

=== Academics ===
Agricultural economist Ashok Gulati has been vocal in his support for the bills and contends that the bills are bold steps in the right direction. The Chief Economist of the International Monetary Fund, Gita Gopinath, said the "farm bills and labour bills are very important steps in the right direction. They have the potential to have more labour market flexibility, providing greater social security to workers and more formalisation of the labour market. In the case of agriculture, having a much more integrated market, creating competition, having farmers getting a greater share of the price that finally the retail price that's paid. So that helps with rural incomes". She also stressed that the implementation of it must be right. Milind Sathye, a professor at the University of Canberra asserts that the new laws will "enable farmers to act together and join hands with the private sector and that the previous system had led to growing farm debt and farmers suicides, among other problems". Rajshri Jayaraman, Associate Economics Professor at the University of Toronto, states that "the bills are confusing and to pass legislation like this affects the largest single sector of the economy and the poorest people in an already poor country during a pandemic."

On 1 January 2021, 866 academicians from across India came out in support of the three farm laws. This includes seven vice-chancellors and academicians from Delhi University, JNU, Rajasthan University, Gujarat University, Allahabad University and Banaras Hindu University among others. Kaushik Basu, former chief economist at the World Bank, supports the cause of the peasants, against the position of Arvind Panagariya, former Chief Economist at the Asian Development Bank. Hansong Li, a Chinese scholar at Harvard University, argues that although India's farm reforms bear resemblance to China's own market-oriented agricultural reforms, India lacks the risk-mitigation mechanisms in the Chinese context, and that the overall crisis has shown a lack of public trust and cohesion in India.

On 24 April 2021, a number of civil society members urged both sides to end the stalemate.

=== Repudiation of awards ===
Former Chief Minister of Punjab, Parkash Singh Badal of the Shiromani Akali Dal returned his Padma Vibhushan award to the President of India on 3 December 2020, in his support of the farmers' protest. On 4 December 2020, environmentalist Baba Sewa Singh returned his Padma Shri Award. Punjabi folk singer Harbhajan Mann refused to accept the Shiromani Punjabi Award by the Punjab Languages Department of the Government of Punjab, India in support of the protests.

Rajya Sabha MP and SAD(D) president Sukhdev Singh Dhindsa also announced that he would return his Padma award due to his personal support of the protests.

=== Social media ===
Videos and images of the protests have helped bring awareness to the farmers cause and many have gone viral including one of a police officer with baton raised in hand towards an elderly Sikh man, Sukhdev Singh. Fake news also circulated such as a morphed video claiming that no violence in this incident had occurred was shared by BJP leader Amit Malviya; however, this video was flagged as being misinformation by Twitter, and the video was criticized publicly as being propaganda. Alternately, protestors wielding swords circulated on the media following the Republic Day protests; over 300 policemen were injured on the 26th.

Hashtags are also being used by youth to show their support and ensure that their hashtags like #FarmersProtest, #standwithfarmerschallenge, #SpeakUpForFarmers, #iamwithfarmers, #kisanektazindabaad, #tractor2twitter, #isupportfarmersare trending to keep the subject relevant on the various social media platforms. Another purpose for the youth posting on social media is to counter the negative posts. These posts also benefit the unions and help them to reach the public about their issues and concerns.

On 20 December 2020, Facebook removed a page named Kisan Ekta Morcha, an official news source from farmers' protest. It was restored after public outrage. Since then both Facebook and Facebook-owned Instagram have been accused of removing and shadow banning content that spoke either in favour of farmers or against the BJP-led government, an accusation it has faced in past too.

In early February a "social media war" erupted after a tweet by Rihanna saying "why aren't we talking about this?!" with the hashtag #FarmersProtest. Numerous celebrities and international figures came out in support such as Greta Thunberg, Lilly Singh, Jamie Margolin, Elizabeth Wathuti and Claudia Webbe. Following this the Indian Ministry of External affairs came out with a clarification statement with the hashtags #IndiaTogether and #IndiaAgainstPropaganda. Indian celebrities such as Akshay Kumar, Ajay Devgn, Suniel Shetty, Karan Johar, Ekta Kapoor, Lata Mangeshkar, Kailash Kher, Ravi Shastri, Anil Kumble, Sachin Tendulkar, Virat Kohli, Rohit Sharma, Shikhar Dhawan, Ajinkya Rahane, Gautam Gambhir, Suresh Raina, P. T. Usha, Manika Batra, Saina Nehwal, Geeta Phogat also posted tweets with the hashtags #IndiaTogether and #IndiaAgainstPropaganda. The Ministry of External Affairs statement characterised a "small section of farmers" as protesting against the legislation and highlighted the Prime Minister's offer to keep the laws on hold.

In February 2021, Twitter removed over 500 accounts that criticized Narendra Modi's government for its conduct during Indian farmers' protests. Ravi Shankar Prasad, the justice and technology minister, told India's parliament: "I politely remind the companies, whether it is Twitter, Facebook, LinkedIn or WhatsApp or anyone, they are free to work in India, do business, but they need to respect the Indian Constitution."

==== Protest Toolkit ====
On 3 February, Greta Thunberg uploaded a document on Twitter which allegedly guided protestors about protests and on how to mobilise people against India and target Indian interests/embassies abroad. It contained actions taken up to 26 January 2021, future actions to undertake, hashtags which trended and would trend, celebrities who would be sympathetic to these protests and solidarity videos etc. She soon deleted the tweet saying that the document was "outdated", and uploaded another toolkit to support protests, sparking a further row.

The Times of India reported that an initial probe by the Modi government, into the source of the toolkit that Thunberg posted, suggested that it was put together by a Canadian pro-Khalistan organization based in Vancouver, and that the toolkit had a plan to carry forward the "malign Indian campaign", even if the government repealed the laws. According to one official, "This showed how sinister the entire campaign was".

On 13 February, Bangalore Fridays for Future activist Disha Ravi was arrested by Delhi Police allegedly for creating and sharing the toolkit. On 23 February, she was granted bail by Additional Sessions Judge Dharmender Rana, who commented that the 'offence of sedition cannot be invoked to minister to the wounded vanity of governments". Eight month later, the Delhi Police had made no headway, and the Indian Express reported that police were unlikely to file a charge-sheet against her, with one option being to close the case.

== Supreme Court of India involvement ==
The Supreme Court of India has received numerous petitions seeking direction to remove protesting farmers from blocking access routes to the capital. The Supreme Court has also conveyed to the central government that it intends to set up a body for taking forward the negotiations. On 17 December, the Supreme Court acknowledged the right to peaceful protest but added, "you (farmers) have a purpose also and that purpose is served only if you talk, discuss and reach a conclusion". The central government opposed the court's recommendation of putting on hold the implementation of the farm laws. Agitating farmer unions have decided to consult Prashant Bhushan, Dushyant Dave, HS Phoolka and Colin Gonsalves as far as the Supreme Court proceedings go.

A plea submitted by several students of Panjab University on 2 December 2020 was registered by the Supreme Court as a public petition on 4 January 2021. The plea was in the form of a letter which called out police excesses, illegal detentions of protesters, "misrepresentation, polarization and sensationalisation" by media channels and approached the matter on humanitarian grounds. A student who drafted the petition informed The Wire that "over the course of over 100 days of the farmers' protest, this is the first petition filed in favour of the protest".

Farmers have said they will not listen to the courts if told to back off or even if the laws are stayed. Farmer union leaders have also raised the issue of the government "dodging dialogue" since the "SC has said earlier that it will not intervene". Congress chief spokesperson Randeep Surjewala made a statement in this regard, "Why does the government want the SC to solve all contentious issues, from the CAA and the National Register of Citizens to farm laws?"

Chief Justices of the Supreme Court during the stay order on the farm laws

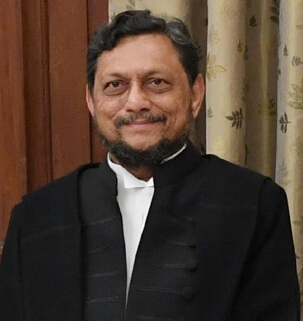
Chief Justice of Supreme Court of India Justice S. A. Bobde, along with justices V. Ramasubramanian and A. S. Bopanna have heard the matters stemming from the farm laws.

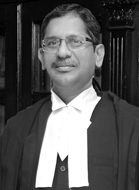
Chief Justice N. V. Ramana took over in April 2021. He has been asked by a farm committee member to make the committee report public.

On 11 January 2021 the Chief Justice of India said during hearings, "We are not experts on agriculture and economics. Tell us whether you (the government) will put these laws on hold or else we will do it. What's the prestige issue here? [...] We don't know if you are part of the solution or part of the problem [...] We have an apprehension that someday maybe, there might be a breach of peace. Each one of us will be responsible if anything goes wrong [...] If the vast majority says that laws are good, let them say it to (a) committee." The Court also stated to the government that they were "...extremely disappointed at the way government is handling all this (farmers protests). We don't know what consultative process you followed before the laws. Many states are up in rebellion." The Court also rejected a claim by Solicitor General Tushar Mehta that the "vast majority" of farmers supported the laws, stating that they had not received any submissions from any person that the laws were beneficial.

=== Supreme Court stay order and farm laws committee ===
On 12 January 2021, the Supreme Court of India suspended the farm laws and formed a committee to look into the grievances of protesting farmers. The CJI, Sharad Arvind Bobde, requested the farmer unions to cooperate. The members of the committee included agriculture experts Ashok Gulati, Pramod Kumar Joshi, Anil Ghanwat and Bhupinder Singh Mann. However, two days later, Bhupinder Singh Mann recused himself in solidarity with the farmers.

Irrespective of Mann recusing himself, and the following criticism, the Supreme Court, and the remaining members of the Supreme Court-appointed committee, continued with the tasks outlined to the committee. Criticism raised, related to bias in appointing the committee, was addressed by the Supreme Court. The committee called on the public for suggestions by 20 February 2021. It went on to conduct a number of meetings online, including speaking to 73 farmers organisations and related organisations.

The report was submitted to the Supreme Court on 19 March 2021. Committee members requested the report be made public three times. Following the repeal of the laws the report was released by committee member Anil Ghanwat on 21 March 2022.

== Counter-legislation by states ==
The Punjab state assembly passed four bills to counter the Centre's three farm laws. Following this Rajasthan and Chhattisgarh also tabled bills to amend and counter the central laws. The respective state governors have either returned the bills or have sat on them refusing to give them assent and send it to the President.

== Fallout ==
As fallout of the growing belief amongst protesting farmers that Mukesh Ambani and Gautam Adani were the principal beneficiaries of the farm laws enacted by the NDA Government, Punjab and Haryana farmers, in protest, decided to surrender Jio-sims and switch to rival networks. A number of Reliance Jio telecom towers and other infrastructure were damaged in Punjab in the last week of December 2020. Punjab Chief Minister Amarinder Singh appealed to the farmers to stop disrupting the communication towers.

On 30 December, Punjab Chief Minister Amarinder Singh objected to the Punjab Governor Vijayender Pal Singh Badnore's summoning of the state's chief secretary and the Director-General of Punjab Police Dinkar Gupta. Gupta has served as DG of Intelligence of Punjab police, and with Intelligence Bureau for eight years before being appointed DG Punjab police. Singh alleged that Badnore had bowed to the "antics of the BJP" which has falsely claimed breakdown of law and order in Punjab. He called upon the BJP to stop slandering the farmers with terms like 'Naxalites', 'Khalistanis', and for the BJP central leadership to pay heed to the voice of the farmers and repeal the farm laws.

== Repeal ==
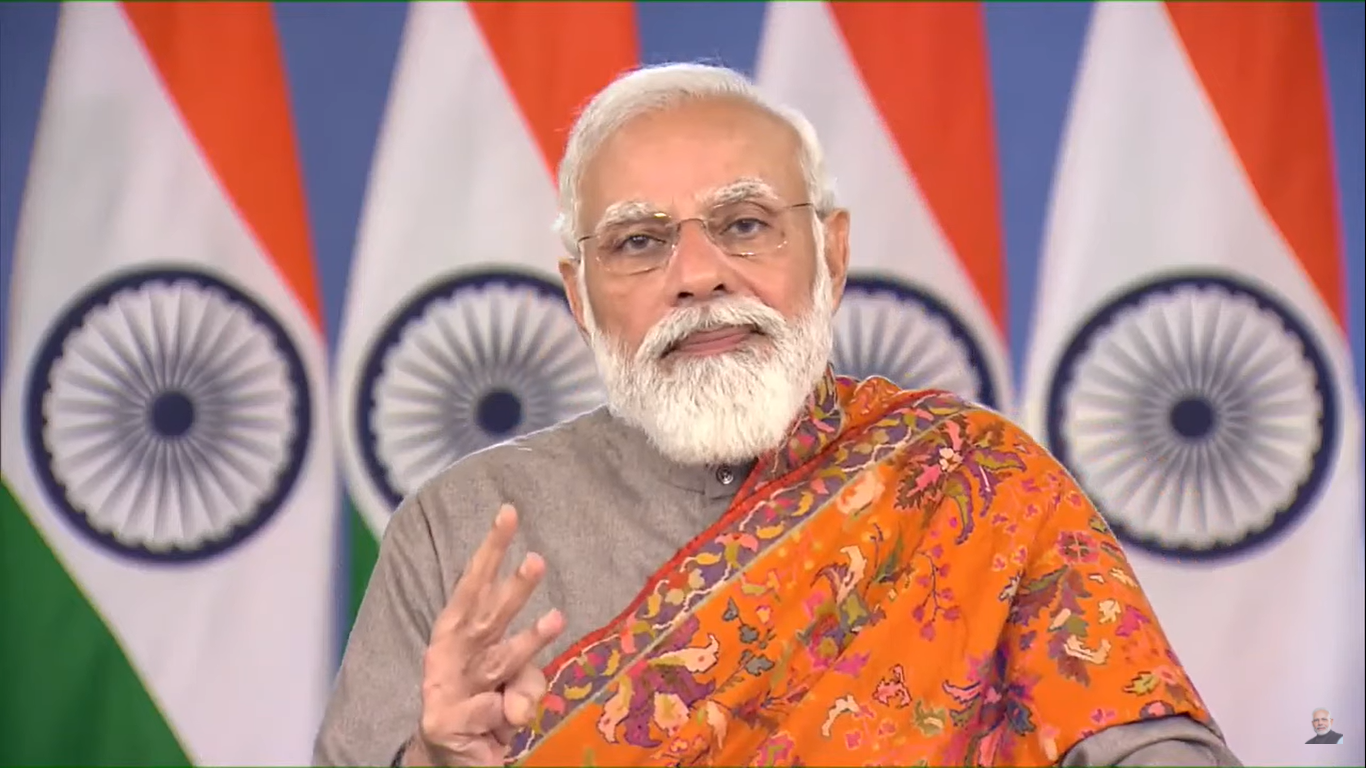
Narendra Modi announcing the repeal of the three controversial laws in a televised address on 19 November 2021

In a televised address on 19 November 2021, Narendra Modi, the prime minister of India, said his government would be repealing the three acts in the upcoming winter parliamentary session in December. In his statement he lamented his government's inability to convince farmers of the law's advantages, saying: "but despite several attempts to explain the benefits to the farmers, we have failed. On the occasion of Guru Purab, the government has decided to repeal the three farm laws." Experts and poll watchers suggested that the forthcoming state elections in Punjab and Uttar Pradesh in 2022 had an effect on Modi's decision. The national spokesperson of the Bharatiya Kisan Union, Rakesh Tikait, stated the protests would only cease once the laws were repealed.

On 29 November, both Houses of the Indian Parliament passed the Farm Laws Repeal Bill, 2021 by voice vote. While there were no objections to the bill, the Opposition objected to passing the bill without debate. The repeal bill was signed by the President of India two days later. Later in March 2022, a high powered expert panel constituted by the Supreme Court found out that 86% of the farmer organizations representing 38.3 million farmers supported the farm laws. The panel received over 19000 representation from various groups. The panel concluded that the repeal and long suspension of farm laws would be unfair to the silent majority of farmers.

== In music, popular media and slogans ==
Since the beginning of protests many songs have been released by singers, songwriters describing the protest and showing unity and solidarity. Several clips of the protest featured in an international collaboration "Ek Din" by Bohemia, The Game and Karan Aujla. Kanwar Grewal who has been involved in gathering support for the protests since the beginning said "Wherever Punjabis are settled in the world, they will always be connected to their roots, their land, and their community", and praised the support of those who were living abroad.

- "Panjab" by Sidhu Moose Wala
- "Sunn Dilliye" by Damanjot
- "Kisaan Anthem" by Shree Brar
- "Ailan" and "Jawani Zindabad" by Kanwar Grewal
- "Pecha" by Harf Cheema, Kanwar Grewal
- "Delhi Aa Punjab Nal Pange Thik Nahi" by R Nait
- "Asi Vaddange" by Himmat Sandhu
- "Jatta Takda Hoja" by Jass Bajwa
- "Haq and Murrde ni laye bina haq, Dilliye" by Harbhajan Mann
- "Farmers' Protest – Theme Song" by Bidita Bag
- "Asi Vaddange" by Himmat Sandhu
- "Tir Te Taj" by Manhoman Waris, Kamal Heer, Sangtar
- "Punjab Bolda" by Ranjit Bawa
- "Panjab Kithe Dabda" by Arjan Dhillon

A number of slogans were used, including:

- No farmers, no food
- India is Killing its Farmers
- Murderer of Democracy in India
- Recall the farm bills
- Dharti Mata Ki Jai (transl. Hail Mother Earth)
- Narendra Modi Kisan Virodhi (transl. Narendra Modi farmer enemy)
- Inquilab Zindabad (transl. Long live the revolution)
- Chahe Kuch Bhi Karlo Hum Badhte Jaenge (transl. No matter what you do we will keep moving forward)
- No Manch or Mike to Politicians (transl. No stage or mic for politicians)

== See also ==
- 2024–2025 Indian farmers' protest
- 2023–2024 European Union farmers' protests
  - Dutch farmers' protests
  - 2023–2025 Czech Union farmers' protests
  - 2023–2024 German farmers' protests
  - 2020s French farmers' protests
  - 2024 Polish farmers' protests
- 2024–2026 United Kingdom farmers' protests
- 2011 land acquisition protests in Uttar Pradesh
- 2017 Tamil Nadu farmers' protest
- 2021 Indian farmers' Republic Day protest
- 2021 Lakhimpur Kheri violence
- Agrarian distress
- Farmers' protest
- National Commission on Farmers
- Neoliberalism
- Satyagraha
