= 2021 Indian farmers' Republic Day protest =

Part of Indian farmers Protest

2021 Farmers' Republic Day Protest
- Part of the 2020–2021 Indian farmers' protest
- Protesting farmer hoisting the Nishan Sahib flag from the ramparts of the Red Fort
- Date: 26 January 2021
- Location: New Delhi, India
- Goals: Abolition of three farm acts

Parties
Delhi Police	Khalsa; Samyukta Kisan Morcha (SKM)

Casualties
- Death: 1 protestor dead
- Injuries: 100+ 89 policemen injured
- Arrested: 200 arrested

The 2021 Farmers' Republic Day protest was a protest on 26 January 2021 at Delhi. Part of the 2020–2021 Indian farmers' protest. The protestors deviated from the parade to take the parade towards Red Fort. The protest took place on the 72nd Republic Day against the decision by Narendra Modi-led National Democratic Alliance (NDA) to implement three farm acts.

The decision to hold the parade with tractors and marching contingents in Delhi was announced on 2 January 2021 by the leadership of the Samyukt Kisan Morcha (SKM). The date of 26 January 2021 was chosen, according to the SKM leaders, because it coincided with the two-month anniversary of the farmers' protest and because "the Republic Day represents the supremacy of the people".

On 26 January, tens of thousands of the farmers protesting agricultural reforms drove a convoy of tractors, earlier than the allotted time, to start the tractor rally into New Delhi. The farmers drove on prohibited routes in long lines of tractors, riding horses or marching on foot. However, a section of the tractor rally turned violent as the protesting farmers clashed with the police. Some of the protesters deviated from their pre-sanctioned routes permitted by Delhi Police and breached the barricades. Some protesters reached central Delhi and resorted to vandalism and damage to public property. Other protestors reached the Red Fort and hoisted the Nishan Sahib (a Sikh religious flag) and farmer union flags on the mast on the rampart of the Red Fort.

As of 28 January, the Delhi Police stated that it has filed various criminal cases over the incidents of violence and had arrested several people. More than 300 police personnel were injured in the violence by protesters, who used batons and sharp weapons. The violence and hoisting of a religious flag on the ramparts of the Red Fort led to the Bharatiya Kisan Union (Bhanu) and the Rashtriya Kisan Mazdoor Sangathan withdrawing from the farmers' protest.

== Dress rehearsal ==
On 7 January 2021, Samyukt Kisan Morcha organized the dress rehearsal of Kisan-parade for 26 January 2021 on the 270 kilometres long Eastern and Western Peripheral Expressway that rings Delhi. 5000 tractors participated in the tractor-trolley parade held between 11:00 a.m. and 4:00 p.m. IST. The 'parade' had four columns, each with its own start point, which were: Singhu, Tikri, Ghazipur, and Rewasan. A fifth farmers' column, with start point Dhansa, was added on the morning on 7 January. Each column is under a leader, with volunteers to ensure good order, after traversing the designated route and distance returned to the start point by evening. The tractor-trolley-parade was the cause of much enthusiasm and was deemed a success by the organizers. The farmers' tractor columns from Ghazipur and Palwal were mainly from Uttar Pradesh (UP), Uttarakhand and Madhya Pradesh (MP), and farmers in the columns from Singhu, Tikri, and Dhansa, were mostly from Punjab, and Haryana. The rehearsal-parade passed without major incident. There were, however minor skirmishes between farmers and policemen in Bulandshahr and Gautam Buddha Nagar. Iraj Raja, Superintendent of Police (Rural), Ghaziabad said no permission was sought for the rally but "the administration was in no mood of confrontation as long as there is no law-and-order problem." The farmers' column from Rewasan, Nuh district, was prevented from participating by the police. Its leader Ramzan Chaudhary, president of All-India Mewati Samaj, was detained on 7 January by Narendra Bijarniya, Superintendent of Police of Nuh district.

Simultaneous Kisan parades were also held in many districts of Punjab, Haryana, Uttar Pradesh, as well as Rajasthan, Maharashtra, Gujarat, Madhya Pradesh, Uttarakhand, Bihar, Andhra Pradesh and Telangana.

== Government response ==
The Indian government had expressed apprehensions before the Supreme Court over what it says is a continued "Khalistani infiltration" in the farmers' protests, pointing out the role of outlawed secessionist groups like Sikhs for Justice. The government alleged that such groups had been using the protests as a cover for collecting money for their causes. The farmers, and their unions, have been accused by government and sections of the media of links with hostile foreign powers such as Pakistan and China of harbouring Naxalites, terrorists, Khalistanis and anti-nationals. It also alleged that the farmers were unable to comprehend the many virtues of the farm bills and the protests to be a front for opposition political parties such as the Indian National Congress. Ravi Shankar Prasad, then the Ministry of Information and Broadcasting, and Union Minister Piyush Goyal, who was a member of the Government delegation engaged in talks with the farmers, were among the ruling party members who made such allegations.

The Government had opposed the farmers' plan for Kisan Gantantra Diwas Parade (transl. Farmers' Republic Day Parade) on the grounds of security, law and order, threats to the nation's prestige and "global image". On 11 January, KK Venugopal, the Attorney General for India, informed the Supreme Court of India that the Intelligence Bureau (IB) had found evidence that the farmers were harbouring Khalistanis. The government ordered the Delhi Police, which comes under the Ministry of Home Affairs, to submit an application to the Supreme Court to prevent the tractor parade. The Delhi Police application claimed that the tractor parade would cause "a massive law and order situation and will cause an embarrassment to the nation" and that the right to protest can never include "maligning the nation globally".

The SKM leadership, disappointed with the accusations by the Government, dismissed the allegations as baseless, stating that it intended to malign and demonise the farmers' movement. Balbir Singh Rajewal, the senior SKM leader has warned farmers to beware of Government attempts to malign the increasing popular movement through ‘dushprachar’ (bad propaganda). He accused the "anti-farmer forces and government agencies" of trying to scuttle the peaceful agitation of farmers and common people.

== Timeline ==
=== 2 January 2021 ===
Samyukt Kisan Morcha (SKM) leaders announced that if their core demands of the repeal of the farm laws and legal guarantee to implement Minimum Support Price (MSP) were not met by 26 January 2021, they would hold a 'Kisan Gantantra Diwas Parade' (transl. Farmers' Republic Day Parade) on that day to coincide with the annual Republic Day Parade, in which the country showcases it tanks, missiles, and military might. Yogendra Yadav of Jai Kisan Andolan issued an appeal to all "farmers from adjoining areas of national capital to be prepared" for the 'Kisan Gantantra Diwas Parade'. Before the main tractor-parade on 26 January, SKM leadership announced a rehearsal of the same on 6 January 2021.

=== 8 January 2021 ===
The eighth round of talks between the SKM at the Government at Vigyan Bhawan, New Delhi, ended without progress. After the talks, union leader Joginder Singh Ugrahan said, "We do not want anything less than the repeal of laws" and that "we will not bow down". Hannan Mollah, another Kisan leader, stated that the tractor parade would be held as planned on 26 January. Balbir Singh Rajewal, reiterated that the government had no constitutional right to legislate on agricultural marketing since it was a state subject. The consensus amongst the farmer coalition was "Bill wapsi toh ghar wapsi (transl. Repeal the laws and we return home)", a slogan coined by Rakesh Takait, the leader of Bharatiya Kisan Union (Tikait).

=== 11 January 2021 ===
The Ministry of Home Affairs (MHA) through Delhi police applied to the Supreme Court to bar the Kisan parade on grounds of security from entering into the National Capital Region of Delhi. Attorney-General KK Venugopal told the Supreme Court that with the impending Republic Day ceremony, "any disruption or obstruction in the said functions would not only be against the law and order, public order, public interest but would also be a huge embarrassment for the nation". The SC, not convinced by the Attorney general's appeals, noted that it was within the powers of the police to control the Kisan march, including finding out if the protestors were armed.

=== 17 January 2021 ===
Farmers write to Delhi Police to seek permission to hold rally at the Ramlila Ground.

=== 20 January 2021 ===
National Democratic Alliance (NDA) during the tenth round of talks with SKM proposed suspending the three new farm laws for one or one-and-a-half years. SKM leader said they will consult with all the 500 farm organizations on 21 January, before taking a final decision on the government proposal. The farmers ask the government to withdraw all the cases registered against the farmers. The SKM after discussion with the union members turned down the proposal, saying that whatever the outcome of 22 January talks the farmer unions would continue with their peaceful protest and would go ahead with the tractor rally on Republic Day. They added that it would cause no disruption to the planned military parade on Rajpath. "Several women will also drive tractors on January 26," Harinder Kaur Bindu, BKU (Ekta Ugrahan) vice president, said.

The government withdrew its plea to SC seeking a ban on the Kisan Tractor Rally after the Supreme Court said "it is a police matter" and that "We are not going to tell you what to do."

=== 23 January 2021 ===
Delhi Police accorded permission, with several conditions, to the farmers to hold their Republic Day parade in Delhi. Farmer leader Darshan Pal stated the barricades and barriers that Delhi Police had placed between the farmers and Delhi, will be removed by the police before 26 January 2021. Similar parades were scheduled to be held across the country

=== 24 January 2021 ===
Dependra Pathak, Special Commissioner and Head of Delhi Police Intelligence, following the sanction by the Delhi Police on Kisan Gantantra Diwas Parade 2021, briefed the media. In his briefing, he said that Delhi Police has intelligence that Pakistan has plans to disrupt the parade. To support the assessment on Pakistan plans he said 'Intelligence' from 'various other agencies' was that '300 Twitter handles created in Pakistan from 13 to 18 January to disturb farmers’ tractor rally'. SN Shrivastava, the Commissioner of Delhi Police issued an order that Delhi Police, Central Armed Police Forces (CAPFs) and 'other force deployed for Republic Day Parade security, should remain in a ready position to move at short notice for law and order arrangement in connection with Kisan Tractor Rally'.

According to Police briefing, 12,000–13,000 tractors were estimated to participate in the Kisan Tractor Parade. The Kisan Parade will start after the end of the parade on the Rajpath. The schedule, the route, have been decided by the police. The route has been limited to routes "away from the arterial points around Tikri, Singhu and Ghazipur borders".

=== 25 January 2021 ===
Samyukta Kisan Morcha, to ensure orderly, nonviolent Farmers' Republic Day Parade, issued detailed instructions for preparation and conduct of the tractor rally. The government deployed 15 companies of paramilitary forces to strengthen the security of the capital city during the protests. Delhi Police issued a traffic advisory for the farmer's tractor rally.

=== 26 January 2021 ===
On 26 January, tens of thousands of the farmers protesting agricultural reforms drove a convoy of tractors into New Delhi. The farmers drove in long lines of tractors, riding horses or marching on foot. The parade started from Singhu Border, Tikri Border and Ghazipur in Delhi on the routes approved by the Police. The farmers were barred from entering the central part of the city where the official Republic Day Parade was taking place. At the Singhu Border starting point, according to the police estimates, around 7000 tractors had gathered. Reuters reported citing farmers' unions that close to 200,000 tractors had participated.

Later, the tractor rally turned into a violent protest as the protesting farmers drove through the barricades and clashed with the police. At around 8 am, a few hours early from the permitted time, farmers started to gather separately at Ghazipur, Singhu and Tikri borders. The tractor rally commenced from the Singhu border and was designated to follow a decided route. However, as the rally progressed, it deviated and marched towards other routes and the protesting farmers clashed with the police forces. The protestors instead of rallying on the pre-decided route, chose to march towards ITO metro station and the city center meanwhile breaking through the barricades. This prompted the Delhi Police to resort to use of tear gas and baton charging. The agitating protestors vandalised a Delhi Transport Corporation (DTC) bus and police vehicles. According to the police, the protestors used sticks, iron rods, pelted stones, while some Nihang protestors rode on horses fully equipped with deadly weapons like swords, kirpans and fursas and some protesters even used their tractors to run over the police. Some protesters driving their speeding tractors rammed barricades and attempted to mow down the policeman on duty. One person reportedly died after he lost control and his tractor overturned on him. Likewise, the postmortem also ascertained the cause of death as "shock and hemorrhage due to antemortem injuries".

A section of the farmers reached and entered the historic Red Fort of Old Delhi and hoisted religious flags from the ramparts and climbed up the domes of the fort. One of the farmers was seen climbing a flagpole in front of the fort and hoisting the Sikh religious flag Nishan Sahib on the flagpole. The clash between police and farmers also caused damage to facilities inside the fort. The fort was vacated following police announcements.

According to the Delhi Police, 394 policemen and thousands of farmers were reported injured, 30 police vehicles were damaged. A high-level meeting was taken by Amit Shah in which decision was taken to deploy additional paramilitary forces in Delhi and to take action against those found violating protest rules. The President Ram Nath Kovind condemned the incidents of violence and the religious flag hoisting and called it an "insult to the national flag and Republic day". Internet services were suspended for hours in several parts of Delhi and the NCR region.

The farmer unions blamed actor turned activist Deep Sidhu and gangster-turned-activist Lakha Sidhana for instigating the violence and hoisting a Nishan Sahib flag on the Red Fort.

== Aftermath ==
=== Police action ===
On 27 January 2021, the names of Darshan Pal, Yogendra Yadav and 35 other farmer leaders were mentioned in the First Information Report (FIR) registered at the Samaypur Badli Police Station against the protestors. The FIR registered at the Ghazipur Police Station in East Delhi named Rakesh Tikait and other farmer leaders for instigating protesters. After the violence, the farmers called off the march to the parliament on 1 February during the budget session. A day after the protest, Twitter suspended over 500 accounts, a majority of those belonging to pro-Khalistan supporters, for spam and platform manipulation.

As of 28 January, the Commissioner stated that the Delhi Police had filed 25 criminal cases on the incidents of violence and arrested 19 people. Punjabi actor Deep Sidhu was charged by the police for allegedly insulting the Indian flag and inciting violence. In a preliminary investigation, the police stated that "there was a pre-conceived and well-coordinated plan to break the agreement between the Delhi Police and the leaders of protesting organizations." Delhi Police filed an FIR under Unlawful Activities (Prevention) Act and sedition against the persons and farm leaders involved in the rioting. Over 200 protesters were detained by the police.

On 7 February, the Delhi police stated that it had traced the instigators of some of the violence caused to the circulation of an online "toolkit (document of propaganda)" through Google. The makers of the toolkit were stated to have direct ties with "pro-Khalistani elements". The toolkit was first tweeted by Swedish climate activist Greta Thunberg. The Delhi Police had also written to Zoom seeking details of the participants of a Zoom meeting in which the toolkit was created. Google is stated to have provided information to the Delhi Police, which led to the arrest of an environmental activist, Disha Ravi, among others. Ravi's arrest and trial became widely publicised. People across the country protested against her arrest. Ravi was released on bail on 24 February 2021 after a court in Delhi held that there was "scanty" and "sketchy" evidence to back charges of sedition against her and that citizens could not be jailed simply because they disagreed with government policies.

=== Response ===
Sharad Pawar, the leader of the Nationalist Congress Party (NCP) said that he does not support the violence that took place during the farmers' protest in Delhi. The Chief Minister of Punjab, Captain Amarinder Singh also condemned the violence.

=== Felicitation of protestors ===
At an event held at the Golden Temple in March 2021, the father of the man who was wanted by the police for hoisting the Nishan Sahib at the Red Fort was felicitated. The gathering also supported other fugitives listed by the Delhi Police over the Republic Day violence. Among those in attendance were the Dal Khalsa president, MLA Sukh Singh Khaira, and the Shiromani Akali Dal (Amritsar) general secretary.

== See also ==
- Delhi Republic Day parade
