= Agnipath Scheme =

Indian military recruitment program

Agnipath Scheme is a tour of duty style scheme approved by the Government of India on 14 June 2022 and implemented in the country a few months later in September 2022, for recruitment of soldiers below the rank of commissioned officers into the three services of the armed forces. All recruits will be hired only for a four year period. Personnel recruited under this system are to be called Agniveers (transl. Fire-Warriors), which will be a new military rank.

Although the scheme bypasses the traditional service benefits (such as pensions, rations, etc) allocated to personnel recruited in the armed forces, the government provides up to ₹50 lakh (US$53,000) rupees in insurance coverage, and they are entitled to receive a lump sum cash payment, a skill certificate and support for finding future employment upon discharge from service. Spokespersons from Indian National Congress, Communist Party of India (Marxist) and Communist Party of India, from the opposition camp, have issued statements criticising and expressing concerns about the consequences of the new scheme. They have asked the scheme to be put on hold and that the scheme be discussed in the Parliament.

Recently, during Operation Sindoor, 3,000 Agniveers played a crucial role in defending the Indian western border from drone attacks orchestrated by Pakistan in the recent 2025 India-Pakistan conflict.

== Background ==
Prior to the introduction of the scheme, soldiers were recruited into the armed forces on a 15+ year tenure with lifelong pension. From 2019, no recruitment in the armed forces was done for three years. The Indian Government cited COVID-19 pandemic in India for this. Meanwhile 50,000 to 60,000 soldiers continued to retire annually, leading to a personnel shortage that had begun to affect the operational capabilities of the armed forces.

Recruitment in the Indian Army under Modi Govt.
Year	Soldiers
2015–16	71,804
2016–17	52,447
2017–18	50,026
2018–19	53,431
2019–20	80,572
2020–21	0
2021–22	0
2022–23	0
2023–24	13,000

In 2020 a 'Tour of duty' scheme was proposed for voluntary recruitment into the forces for civilians to enable them to join for three years of short service. The proposed scheme was on a trial basis and was planned to start with a test group of 100 officers and 1000 soldiers.

The scheme has been taken to be named after Agnipath, a Hindi poem by Harivansh Rai Bachchan and a popular 1990 film of the same name based on the poem.

== Overview ==
The Agnipath scheme was approved by the Indian Government in June 2022 to be implemented from September 2022. The announcement was done on 14 June 2022. The scheme is for both male and female aspirants of age group 17.5 to 21 years. In the midst of widespread protests against the scheme, the Central Government raised the upper limit from 21 to 23, but only for recruitment in the year 2022. The recruitment through this scheme is to be twice a year for the Indian Army, the Indian Navy and the Indian Air Force. The posts available are below the officer cadre.

The recruits named Agniveers serve for a tenure of four years that include training for six months followed by 3.5 years deployment. After retirement from the service, they will have the opportunity to apply to continue in the armed forces. Upto 25 percent of the total strength of the retiring batch will be selected for the permanent cadre. Personnel who retire after 4 years of service will not be eligible for pension, but will receive a lump sum amount of approximately ₹11.71 lakh (US$13,000) at the end of tenure. The Indian government plans to recruit 45,000 to 50,000 new personnel every year through this scheme. In September 2022, 46,000 youngsters were recruited through the scheme.

== Reservation and welfare benefits ==
On 17 July 2022, Jammu and Kashmir's Lieutenant Governor Manoj Sinha announced a 10% reservation in Jammu and Kashmir Police service for those who retire after serving in the military under the Agnipath scheme.

On 12 July 2024, Central Industrial Security Force, Border Security Force and Railway Protection Force announced 10% reservation and age relaxation for former Agniveer soldiers. The reservation is also applicable within Central Armed Police Forces and Assam Rifles.

On 17 July 2024, Government of Haryana announced 10% reservation in the police force of Haryana Police, mining guards and forest guards. The state government also announced incentives for private sector for hiring agniveers. Age relaxation for government jobs in Group B and C categories was also announced along with a 5% reservation in Group C jobs. The state government has also interest benefits for businesses set up by retired military under the Agnipath scheme. The chief minister also promised priority in government departments, boards and corporation jobs.

On 26 July 2024, Odisha Chief Minister Mohan Charan Majhi announced 10% reservation and a 5-year age relaxation for Agniveers in the state's uniformed services.

On 4 November 2026, the Union Cabinet of India has extended two year additional engagement period for all the first batch Agniveer recruits, to join the armed forces as regular soldiers, subject to their willingness and fulfillment of selection criteria.

== Criticism ==
The scheme will not include long tenures, pensions, or other benefits that existed in the old system. Individuals aspiring to join Armed Forces were disappointed with the rules of the new scheme. The main causes of concern were the short length of service, no pension provisions for those released early, and the 17.5 to 21-year age restriction. Many of the current aspirants were rendered ineligible to serve in the Indian armed forces under these new rules.

Before the introduction of the new scheme for recruitment, Indian government did not produce any white papers. The scheme was neither debated in the parliament nor in the Parliamentary Standing Committee on Defence. No information about the scheme was given to the public prior to its announcement.

=== By political parties and activists ===
The Hindu in its editorial, asked the scheme to be put on hold and stated —

"If a soldier's job is now turned into contractual employment, it might not motivate aspirants who hope for job security, pension, and honour. The argument that defence should not be treated as an employment guarantee scheme is rhetorically impressive, but the fact is that from the manufacturing of arms to the employment of soldiers, the sector plays a critical role in the economy. For a country like India, where unemployment remains a major policy challenge, the concerns cannot be dismissed easily. The Government also faces the very credible charge that this is nothing more than a cost-cutting plan."

- Opposition parties in India have asked the scheme to be put on hold and that the scheme be discussed in the Parliament.
- The Congress party, criticizing the new recruitment plan 'Agnipath' in the army as unjust towards the youth, stated that if it comes to power, it will scrap this scheme and reinstate the old recruitment process. This was stated by the party's president, Mallikarjun Kharge.
- The Communist Party of India (Marxist) CPI(M) stated that it strongly disapproved of "the 'Agnipath' scheme that does disservice to India's national interests. Professional armed forces cannot be raised by recruiting 'soldiers on contract' for a period of four years. This scheme, to save pension money, severely compromises the quality and efficiency of our professional armed forces."
- The Indian National Congress called the scheme neither in the interest of the country nor its security, and has asked for a rollback of the scheme.
- Congress leader and former Finance Minister P. Chidambaram took a dig at Agnipath scheme and said, "If you wish to be trained as a driver, washerman, or barber, become an Agniveer If you wish to be trained as a chowkidar, become an Agniveer If you wish to learn to fry pakoras, become an Agniveer If you wish to become a soldier, do not apply."
- Congress MP Rahul Gandhi said, "When India faces threats on two fronts, the uncalled for Agnipath Scheme reduces the operational effectiveness of our armed forces. The BJP government must stop compromising the dignity, traditions, valour, and discipline of our forces." On 27 June, he said "They used to talk of 'One Rank, One Pension, now they have come up with 'no rank, no pension'." He further said that the Chinese army (People's Liberation Army) is 'sitting on our land' and asserted that the army should be strengthened. "When there is a war results of this will be evident...they are weakening the army, it will harm the country and they call themselves nationalists. Just like the farm laws were repealed, the government will have to roll back the Agnipath scheme also."
- Congress leader and Territorial Army Captain Sachin Pilot appealed to the central government not to show "stubbornness" and immediately withdraw the new army recruitment scheme 'Agnipath' for wider deliberation to avoid recurrence of the agriculture law episode. He said the country has been placed in a "permanent turmoil" over the past few years, and the "rejection of the Agnipath scheme", unemployment, and economic and agrarian distress have led to "fierce resentment" of the youth. Pilot said the government should stop blaming the opposition for the "genuine" grievances of the youth and avoid the blame game played by it during the agriculture law movement.
- Former Chief Minister of Punjab and a veteran of Sino-Indian and Indo-Pak wars, Captain Amarinder Singh suggested the Centre to review the 'Agnipath' policy of recruitment in defence forces. "It will dilute the long existing distinct ethos of regiments," He said in a statement, while remarking, "four year service is too short for a soldier".
- Haryana leader of the opposition, Bhupinder Singh Hooda stated, "It has far-reaching consequences, and these have not been fully considered while preparing this scheme. In the long run, the policy would have a detrimental impact on our national security," he alleged, "It seems the government is compromising with the security of the country with the intention of saving money on salary, pension, gratuity and halving the strength of the armed forces."
- Chief Minister of West Bengal Mamata Banerjee criticised the BJP-led central government, alleging that the saffron camp was trying to create its own 'armed' cadre base through the new defence recruitment programme. Terming the scheme as an insult to the armed forces, Banerjee also wondered whether the BJP plans to hire Agniveer soldiers as "watchmen" at its party offices after their four-year service period. "The BJP is trying to create its own armed cadre base through this scheme. What will they do after four years? The party wants to give arms into the hands of the youth", she said in the assembly. She also said the BJP is trying to fool the masses ahead of the 2024 Lok Sabha election by announcing such schemes.
- Samajwadi Party president and former Chief Minister of Uttar Pradesh Akhilesh Yadav called the scheme, "negligent" and potentially "fatal" for the country's future.
- Rashtriya Loktantrik Party (RLP) chief said that the people returning after four years of service would cause gang wars in the country.
- After the media briefing by the tri-service chiefs, the Leader of the Opposition in Rajya Sabha Mallikarjun Kharge said, "For the first time in 75 years, service chiefs are being fronted to defend a policy decision by the government."
- Cabinet Minister Tej Pratap Yadav, said "the Prime Minister diverted the attention from the "sena" (army) to Shiv Sena." referring to the defection of a few MLA's from Shiv Sena.
- Trade unions and farmers also pledge their support for nationwide protests against the Agnipath Scheme. Amarjeet Kaur, general secretary of the All India Trade Union Congress, said the Narendra Modi government's string of policy decisions over the last eight years had caused great suffering to ordinary people.
- Rakesh Tikait, National President of Bharatiya Kisan Union said "Agnipath Scheme is a political issue, Army Chief should not do politics. Wherever the army has done politics, there have been coups. Don't put that wrong tradition."

=== By retired defence personnel ===
- Param Vir Chakra Captain Bana Singh spoke out against the scheme saying "There should have been more debate and discussion before bringing in the scheme. It makes little sense to bring such sweeping changes without engaging all stakeholders. However, now we must wait and watch how the scheme takes effect." His tweet was later deleted with some sources pointing towards pressure from the Indian government.
- Admiral Arun Prakash, former Chief of the Naval Staff, said that the scheme will be difficult to implement in unison for the tri-services. He further said, "in its present form, is suitable only for the army, whose large infantry component is not excessively burdened with technology. In case of the navy and air force, it must be recognised that at least 5-6 years are required before a new entrant can acquire enough hands-on experience to be entrusted with the operation or maintenance of lethal weapon systems and complex machinery and electronics".
- Lieutenant general Raj Kadyan, former Vice Chief of the Army Staff, had already raised his opposition against the move when he was in service, saying this kind of scheme is fit for a low-risk organisation. "We are trying it out in the defence forces, where the risk is very high…. I only hope and pray there is no war. If there's [going to be a] war, you don't expect a man who is already looking beyond four years to be committed to the extent that he can lay down his life," he said.
- Lieutenant general D S Hooda, former General Officer Commanding-in-Chief Northern Command who oversaw the 'surgical strike' in September 2016 noted during an interview. "... It takes a lot of time – in my experience, at least 4-5 years for people to be trusted to work on the systems in their own individual capacity. For 4-5 years, you are actually under the tutelage of a senior person. No airmen, no air warrior signs for history in the clearance home for an aircraft going for a fight. It is similar for riders, anti-aircraft missile systems, and so on. I'm sure a similar thing goes for the Naval systems too. So, at the right time of four years, when they are ready to be exploited for their full potential, you are asking 75% of the people to go. And then you get a new lot coming in, and you have to start from scratch."
- Lieutenant general Vinod Bhatia, Paratrooper and former Director General Military Operations (DGMO), spoke to the media and also made his opposition to the move clear: "On ToD [Tour of Duty], pray & hope that Agneepath succeeds, for the sake of the nation, armed forces and the Agniveers. The government will need to take the ownership and ensure it succeeds as the process is irreversible and high risk." Later he said, "I am a paratrooper, I take risks, but this is not a risk I would've taken; the Fauj(Army) ethos may change."
- Major general G. D. Bakshi came down heavily against the proposal, stating that he was "flabbergasted by the Agniveer scheme. "I thought initially it was a trial being done on a pilot basis. This is an across-the-board change to convert the Indian armed forces to a short-tenure quasi-conscript force like the Chinese (referring to the Chinese People's Liberation Army). For God Sake Please Don't do it," he said. Appealing to the Centre not to destroy institutions, he continued: "Let us not destroy our institutions in a time of great threats from China & Pakistan. Just for saving money let us not destroy what we have. Armed forces need a mixture of youth and experience. Four-year tenure forces could be risk averse. Learn from Russia (sic)." "Switching to a 4-year virtual tour of duty model overnight would be a highly disruptive change," the vocal retired Army officer said.
- Major general Sheonan Singh, who was the Second-in-command of 10 Para Commandos, was deployed in Sri Lanka as part of the Indian Peace Keeping Force, said: "It's a foolish move, one that could affect the efficiency of the security forces." He further stated, "Saving money is good, but it should not be done at the cost of defence forces. If you go to war with an experienced soldier, will a person with four years of training be able to replace him on his death? These things don't work like this."
- Air Vice Marshal Manmohan Bahadur has argued that the scheme is a radical departure from the methodologies used by the Indian Army for over two centuries and decades by the Indian Air Force and Indian Navy. Any change, he suggests, should have been done in incremental steps and stages.
- Brigadier V. Mahalingam, former Commander of a Mountain Brigade and former Force Commander of the NSG (Black Cat Commandos) said "It will degrade the Army's ability to win wars. Unfortunately, the decision makers have not fought a war or know what it means to exercise command & control when the bullets are flying or when you have to assault a well prepared position."
- Wing commander Anubha Jain from the Indian Air Force said "the spineless Generals are falling over each other to appease the government."
- Ex-Army Jawans also slammed the scheme quoting, "Don't experiment with Army, what if they join gangsters after four years?". District President of the Ex-Servicemen Welfare Union in Faridkot Havildar Premjit Singh Brar said, "This is a wrong move. No one will be interested in joining the Army on these terms and conditions. It is like raising a private army. If someone dies on the border, they say they will only give him fixed compensation and that his family will not get any pension or any benefit. Why should anyone be willing to die under these circumstances?".

=== By state governments ===
On 30 June Punjab Legislative Assembly passed a resolution recommending the state government that it urges the Union Government of India to immediately roll back the scheme. The resolution was opposed by BJP members of the assembly who were in minority. Punjab was the only state to pass such a resolution.

=== Data on employment of veterans ===
Data from Director General Resettlement, Government of India - the nodal body responsible for rehabilitating retired military personnel, shows that states, Central public sector units, including defence PSUs, and Central Armed Police Forces (CAPF) have failed to recruit against the vacancies reserved for veterans.

According to a Department of Personnel & Training (DoPT) provision, 10 per cent of vacancies in Central government jobs in Group C and 20 per cent in Group D are reserved for veterans.

For public sector banks, Central public sector units, and CAPF, the reservation is 14.5 and 24.5 per cent, respectively. But, as of June last year, ex-servicemen constituted only 1.15% of the Group C strength and 0.3% of the Group D strength in 94 of the 170 CPSUs.

The picture is more dismal if Central ministries are taken into consideration. Between 32 Central ministries, only 1.60 per cent of the 22,168 positions reserved for veterans have been filled. For instance, the Indian Railways, one of the world's largest employers, could only fill 1.4 per cent (16,264 out of the 1.15 million) positions reserved for retired personnel of the armed forces. For the ten defence PSUs, where the Centre has announced a 10 per cent reservation for the Agnipath scheme, veterans constituted only 3.45 per cent and 2.71 per cent of Group C and Group D posts, respectively. Even the paramilitary forces haven't shown much interest in hiring veterans.

As of June 2021, only 0.62 per cent of positions reserved for veterans have been filled by the five wings of the paramilitary forces - Border Security Force (BSF), Central Reserve Police Force (CRPF), Indo-Tibetan Border Police (ITBP), Sashastra Seema Bal (SSB), and Central Industrial Security Force (CISF).

Recruitment of Ex-servicemen of the Indian armed forces in central government
Organisation	Central public sector units	Public sector banks	Departments of central government	Central Armed Police Forces
Percentage	0.30	21.34	2.66	0
Ex-servicemen in group D	404	22,839	8,642	0
Total strength in group D	134,733	1,07,009	3,25,265	0
Percentage	1.15	9.10	1.29	0.47
Ex-servicemen in group C	3,138	24,733	13,976	4,146
Total strength in group C	272,848	2,71,741	10,84,705	88,1397

The states have also been unable to find jobs for military returns. For instance, by the end of 2020, Bihar, UP, Punjab and Haryana, which cumulatively account for 80 per cent of the Indian armed forces, have given jobs to only 1.5 per cent out of the 200,000 veterans who had registered for a job.

Reemployment of ex-servicemen of the Indian armed forces in India's largest states
State	Number of ex-servicemen registered for employment	Total jobs given	Percentage %
Rajasthan	53,373	1,415	2.6
Uttar Pradesh	86,192	1,616	1.8
Punjab	60,772	1,150	1.8
Haryana	29,275	534	1.8
Bihar	43,845	6	0.01

== Protests ==
On 14 June 2022, soon after the announcement of the scheme, violent protests erupted in several states in India where the army aspirants angry with the new scheme called for its rollback and damaged public property including buses and trains. This scheme evoked mixed reactions from army veterans mostly negative.

On 15 June 2022, the news of the protest was first reported from the state of Bihar where National highways and railway tracks were blocked by the protesters.

On 16 June 2022, violence was reported at Chhapra, Jehanabad, Munger and Nawada in Bihar. Army aspirants burnt down trains and buses. They set fire to train bogies in Kaimur and Chhapra districts, blocking train traffic in Siwan, Ara, Jehanabad, Nawada, Saharsha, Chhapra, and road traffic in some places. Later the protests along with violent incidents were reported in Uttar Pradesh, Madhya Pradesh, Haryana and other states. More than 200 trains were affected by the protests, 35 trains have been cancelled and 13 trains were terminated short of their destination.

On 17 June, protesters attacked the house of the Deputy Chief Minister of Bihar, Renu Devi. The mobs of young protesters went on a rampage and set fire to trains and other property after which Bihar government ordered internet shutdowns in 18 districts. More than 325 people were arrested in Bihar and 250 in Uttar Pradesh. 12 trains were set on fire, and the movement of 300 trains were affected. 214 trains were cancelled, 11 trains were diverted and 90 were terminated short of their destination. At least 1 person was killed in the protests.

A 19 year old protester was shot dead in Telangana. Internet was shut down in 12 districts of Bihar. In the BJP-ruled Haryana massive protest occurred in which the angry protesters threw stones at vehicles in Ballabhgarh, squatted on railway tracks to stop train movement in Jind and burnt tyres in Rohtak. In Uttar Pradesh hundreds of angry young protesters carried bamboo sticks and stones and stormed railway premises in several cities, blocked highways and targeted private vehicles.

On 18 June, protesters in Bihar called for a strike against the scheme. They clashed with the police and set fire to several vehicles since morning in Bihar. Train services were stopped in Bihar till 8 pm on 18 June. They will be stopped again from 4 am onwards on 19 June. More than 350 trains were cancelled across India as the violence continued in several states.

Chief Minister of Rajasthan Ashok Gehlot leading the State Council of Ministers passed a unanimous resolution calling for the withdrawal of the scheme. In Kerala a large protest march was held in Thiruvananthapuram and Kozhikode, against the scheme. The protesters said their strikes would continue till the Centre rolls back its decision and ensured justice.

Among the states, the worst incidents of violence occurred in Bihar, where the protesters set trains on fire, vandalised railway stations, and attacked BJP leaders' offices, homes, and cars. Two BJP MPs and eight BJP legislators (including two Deputy Chief Ministers) were given the third-highest level 'Y' Category security by the central government after approval by Narendra Modi.

Student organization like Students' Federation of India (SFI) organised took massive rallies and protests in several parts of country against the alleged anti youth scheme. There were protests in Delhi, UP, Haryana, Rajasthan and other parts of the country. SFI along with Democratic Youth Federation of India have called for a protests at Jantar mantar on 19 June.

On 19 June, Virendra Kumar, Chief Public relations officer, East Central Railway, told media that estimates of the damage to property are still being made, but approximately upwards of Rs 700 crore property has been damaged. He also said that five trains, 60 coaches and 11 engines have been burnt, railway is preparing a full report for the damage caused to property. In Karnataka, Police lathi-charged Agnipath protesters in Karnataka's Dharwad. Anti-'Agnipath' protests were also reported from other parts of Karnataka, such as Gokak and Belgaum districts. Patna District magistrate said 23 FIRs were registered and 147 arrests were made. He alleged the involvement of 3 coaching centres in the protests. Ludhiana Police termed the protests "planned conspiracy" as the Ludhiana Railway station was vandalised.

Congress leader Kanhaiya Kumar called the new military recruitment scheme, "a scam" but added that the protests against it should be peaceful.

=== Bharat Bandh (All India Strike) ===
On 20 June, a country wide strike named Bharat Bandh was called by the protesting organisations demanding a roll back of the scheme. The call was made on social media without naming any organisation. More than 600 trains were cancelled due to the strike. The Delhi-Gurgaon Expressway saw heavy traffic jams following a call for Bharat Bandh against the recruitment scheme. In Faridabad and Noida, prohibitory orders had been imposed that prohibit the assembly of four or more persons. Massive jams was seen on the expressway near the Sarhaul border as Delhi Police checked vehicles. Internet services were shut down in more than 20 districts of Bihar

In Jharkhand, all schools were closed and heavy security was deployment in state on calls for a bandh. In Karnataka, holiday was announced for 75 educational institutions on the wake Prime Minister Narendra Modi's visit to the state. Some attributed it to security concerns due to the ongoing protests and calls for a bandh. Section 144 was imposed in some parts of the state of Rajasthan, Punjab, Uttar Pradesh and Haryana. In Jammu and Kashmir, Aam Aadmi Party leader Mehraj Malik put under house arrest. Government of Bihar suspended Internet in 20 districts amid protests. Meanwhile, it enhanced the securities of BJP offices in 11 districts. The Bihar Police deployed Sashastra Seema Bal personnel at the offices of BJP to prevent any untoward incidents.

=== 21 June onwards ===
21 June onwards several protest marches were held in multiple cities. Samyukt Kisan Morcha has supported the protests and planned protest meetings between 7–14 August.

== Response by the Government ==
- Prime Minister Narendra Modi said it is India's "misfortune" that good intentions get trapped in politics. On 20 June, he said "Several decisions look unfair at present. In time, those decisions will help in building the nation."
- Minister of Defence Rajnath Singh speaking at a conclave, said, "It is bringing revolutionary changes in the recruitment process in the armed forces. Some people are spreading misunderstanding about it. Maybe, there could be some confusion among the people as it is a new scheme."
- Chief of the Army Staff Manoj Pande reacted to the protests saying "Army aspirants' angst was the result of improper information."
- Chief of the Naval Staff R. Hari Kumar speaking on protests, said, "I didn't anticipate any protests like this. I think the protests are happening due to misinformation and misunderstanding of the scheme."
- Chief of the Air Staff Vivek Ram Chaudhari condemned the violence and stated, "The last step [of the recruitment process] is police verification: if anyone is involved, they won't get a clearance from police."
- Additional Secretary in the Department of Military Affairs, Lieutenant general Anil Puri reacting to the growing agitation said "Aspirants need to prove they were not part of protests". He further said "Coming to the rollback of the scheme, no. Why should it be rolled back? It is the only progressive step to making the country young."
- National General Secretary of BJP Kailash Vijayvargiya said that the Agniveer can get jobs as security guards at BJP offices. The video of the remark went viral, and several opposition parties condemned his statement Delhi Chief Minister Arvind Kejriwal responded that the "country's youth work hard day and night to pass the physical test and exam because they want to serve the country for their whole life by joining the military and not because they want to join as guards for the BJP office."
- Minister of Tourism G Kishan Reddy explaining the training process at a press conference, stated that people selected as Agniveers would be given training for the "skills of drivers, washermen, barbers, electricians and other professionals". The video clip of the remark became viral. Reddy said that there would be drivers, electricians, barbers and thousands other posts and people selected under this scheme, would be helpful in those jobs. A reporter noted that Skill Development Corporations was already established to train youth with different skills, Reddy answered that such skills would be imparted in Agnipath scheme as well.
- Minister of Sports, Youth Affairs and Minister of Information and Broadcasting Anurag Thakur said that after retirement from service, Agniveers will be considered for appointment as physical education teachers in schools.
- BJP MLA Haribhushan Thakur termed those protesting against the Agnipath scheme "Jihadis". He said, "They have nothing to do with patriotism. Those protesting against the Agnipath scheme are jihadis, or they are those with vested interest. Those who want to serve the nation are very happy with the scheme. This is not a job but a service to the nation. People have to sacrifice their lives for it."
- National Security Advisor of India Ajit Doval on 21 June 2022 said "the scheme will not be rolled back."

== Plea in the Supreme Court against the scheme ==
3 pleas were filed in the Supreme Court of India in June by Advocates M. L. Sharma, Vishal Tiwari and Harsh Ajay Singh against the Agnipath scheme. Sharma alleged that the government has quashed the century-old selection process for the Armed forces which is contrary to the constitutional provisions and without having parliamentary approval.

A plea, filed in the apex court by Advocate M. L. Sharma, has sought to quash the 14 June notification/press note claiming it to be illegal and unconstitutional. M. L. Sharma alleged that on 14 June 2022, contrary to the constitutional provisions and without having approval in parliament and without any gazette notification, the Centre tinkered with the century-old Army selection process and imposed the scheme for recruitment in all three Armed forces divisions. The plea also referred to the protest all over the country against the scheme. The plea has also sought directions to the Centre and Uttar Pradesh, Telangana, Bihar, Haryana, and Rajasthan governments to submit a status report on the violent protests. It has sought a direction to set up an expert committee under the chairmanship of a retired apex court judge to examine the scheme and its impact on national security and Army.

On 6 July, a fresh plea was filed in the Supreme Court by ex-servicemen Ravindra Singh Shekhawat. He has sought quashing of notification issued by the Ministry of Defence, contending it as illegal, unconstitutional, and ultra vires to the rights guaranteed under the Constitution. He said, "The recently launched scheme has received skepticism nationwide from the armed forces aspirants and has left several questions unanswered. Some of the concerns are related to the aspirants who were in the middle/final stages of their recruitment process.This abrupt change in the recruitment process has evoked several unforeseeable circumstances for the aspirants and has put their futures at stake/in the dark. The scheme fails to accommodate the individuals who have been preparing for the armed forces for the last many years and have not been able to participate in the recruitment process due to lack of vacancies due to COVID-19," the plea said. Plea also sought direction to initiate a 'Pilot project', to study the cause and effect of the scheme, and the impact of the newly introduced training process on combat effectiveness, operational readiness, and defence preparedness.

On the same day, a petition was also moved before the Delhi High Court by various candidates shortlisted as Airmen in Indian Air Force seeking issuance of enrolment list and completion of previous recruitment as per a 2019 notification, without being affected by Centre's new Agnipath recruitment scheme for armed forces. A division bench consisting of Justice Suresh Kumar Kait and Justice Saurabh Banarjee deferred the petition for two weeks in view of the pendency of a similar matter before the Supreme Court. Filed through Advocate Prashant Bhushan, the plea has been moved by 20 candidates awaiting their enrolment as Airmen in Indian Air Force in Group "X" trades (except education instructor trade) and Group "Y" trades (except automobile technician), Indian Air Force (Security), Indian Air Force (Police) and musician trades.

== First Agniveer batch (2023) ==
One of the oldest and the largest training centers of Indian Army, the Nashik Road-based Artillery Centre is one of the venues approved by army for training the youths recruited as Agniveers. The first batch consisting of 5000 Agniveers will undergo 31-week rigorous training at the Artiliery Centre, of which first 10 weeks will be for basic military training, whereas the balance 21 weeks will be for advanced training programmes. The Agniveers will be divided in to four disciplines- drivers, gunners, radio operators and technical assistants, on the basis of their aptitude and skill.

The state of the art Agniveer Training Facility located at Jammu and Kashmir Light Infantry(JAKLI) Regiment Center, Dhansal of Udhampur district was visited by General Officer Commanding-in- Chief (GOC-in-C) Northern Command, to review the preparedness and arrangement for the first batch.

Indian Armed Forces will recruit 46,000 Agniveers in 2023 including 40,000 in the Indian Army. The remaining 3,000 Agniveers each will be inducted into Indian Navy and Indian Air Force. About 19,000 personnel below officer rank (PBOR) recruited as Agniveers of the Indian Army started training at nearly 40 centres across India from January 2023, while second batch 21,000 Agniveers will start training in March 2023. 25% of Agniveers will be retained by the Indian Army at the end of a four-year tour of duty (ToD) to serve out their full tenure of 17 more years, while the remaining will be relieved.

As of May 2024, two batches of 40,000 have completed training under the Army and 20,000 more are being trained since November 2023. Further, three batches of 7,385 Agniveer Navy and two batches of 4,955 Agniveer Vayu (Air Force) have completed training.

On 1 June 2024, another batch of 2,614 Agniveer Vayu (Air Force) trainees completed their training from Airmen Training School. In June 2024, third batch of 2,500 Agniveers (914 from Madras Regimental Centre, 560 from Maratha Light Infantry Regimental Centre, 624 from Punjab Regimental Centre, 402 from Ladakh Scouts) completed their 31-week training and joined the Army.

In July 2024, reports suggested that around one lakh Agniveers are recruited in the army and about 70,000 were deployed. A vacancy of 50,000 Agniveers were reported for 2024-25 and recruitment procedure is on.

By August 2024, three batches of around 2,500 Agniveer Navy sailors graduated from INS Chilka training facility. The fourth batch of 1,429 sailors graduated from the same on 10 August 2024. On 13 November 2026, the largest contingent of Agniveer trainees in a single batch graduated from the Navy facility compromising of 3,358 sailors including 142 women.

=== Hyderabad ===
On 1 January 2023, a 31-week systemised training for first batch of 2,264 personnel below officer rank (PBOR) recruited as Agniveers commenced at the Golconda Artillery Centre in Hyderabad. The training for second batch of about 3,000 start on 3 March 2023.

=== Nashik ===
In January 2023, the training for the first batch of 2,640 Agniveers started in Nashik Road-based Artillery centre. The training for the second batch will start in March 2023. These Agniveers will get the opportunity to serve as Gunners (Topchi), Technical Assistants, Radio Operators and Motor Drivers in Indian Army.

=== Ranikhet ===
In January 2023, the training for 796 Agniveers started in Ranikhet, regimental headquarters of the Kumaon Regiment, at the Somnath Sharma Parade ground.

== Amendment in recruitment procedure ==
Army recruitment procedure of Agniveers is set to change. Army has decided to conduct online Common Entrance Exam (CEE) before the physical recruitment. Approximately 200 centers across the country have been identified for the conduct of first online CEE. Online applications for registration will be available for one month from mid February 2023 for the exam scheduled in April 2023. The amended recruitment process aims at cognitive aspect and reduction of large crowds during recruitment rallies resulting in better management and easier conduct.

In May 2024, reports emerged about a survey that was conducted by Indian Army. It was reported that some changes in the scheme may be proposed to the government that will be formed after 2024 Indian general election. The survey, consisting of 10 questions, has been sent to the 'stakeholders' concerned. By the end of May, each group's responses to the particular questions will be compiled and evaluated further. According to the report, recruiters will also be required to reply to inquiries regarding the scheme's overall effect on Army recruiting following its implementation. The training staff at regimental centres, unit and sub-unit commanders of the Agniveers were also surveyed. The recruiters shall be asked about the impact of the scheme after int implementation. Along with observations on the Agniveers' training and general educational standards, the Army's training personnel at the regiment centres is expected to offer details on the Agniveers' physical standards. It is also expected of the staff to respond to different aspects of training and the influence of competition for permanent absorption in the Army on the overall mindset of the Agniveers.

== See also ==
- Auxiliaries
- Auxiliary Force (India)
- Gurkha
- Territorial Army (India)
- Reliance Global Corporate Security
- GMR RAXA
