= Lakha Sidhana =

Indian social activist and politician

- Born: 1979/1980; Bathinda, Punjab, India
- Occupations: Social activist and politician
- Political party: Akali Dal (Waris Punjab De)

Lakhvir Singh Sidhana, better known as Lakha Sidhana is an Indian social activist and politician of the Akali Dal Waris Punjab De.

== Early life ==
Sidhana was born in the Sidhana village of Bathinda district of Punjab, India. Beginning as a successful Kabaddi player and a student leader, Sidhana eventually morphed into an infamous local Gangster, being accused in multiple charges and being imprisoned in 2004. After facing his sentences, Sidhana turned towards Grassroots social activism.

== Activism ==
Sidhana was a major youth leader and influencer of the 2020–2021 Indian farmers' protest, working closely with organizations like Samyukt Kisan Morcha from the initial stages. He came under significant spotlight at the 2021 Indian farmers' Republic Day protest for alleged involvement in the commotion at Red Fort. Sidhana denied any allegations of inciting violence, stating that he instead tried to calm down the situation.

Sidhana is an adamant advocate for the preservation of Punjabi language and culture, often criticizing the implementation of Hindi in certain schools, protesting against the lack of Punjabi billboards, and speaking on the distortion of Punjabi and Sikh literature.

Attempting to participate in the 2024-2025 Indian farmers' protest, Sidhana was kept on high alert by police in Delhi and Haryana due to his arrest during 2021 Indian farmers' Republic Day protest.

Sidhana has also supported the Qaumi Insaaf Morcha at times, which aims for the release of Sikh political prisoners. A segment of this protest was held by Akali Dal (Waris Punjab De) at Chandigarh on 29 July, 2026, which also advocated for the release of Khadoor Sahib MP Amritpal Singh. A FIR was registered by Chandigarh Police against Sidhana and 14 other members of Akali Dal (Waris Punjab De).

== Politics ==
Sidhana entered politics as a member of Shiromani Akali Dal, serving as an aide to Minister Sikander Singh Maluka. He unsuccessfully contested from Rampura Phul in 2012 from ticket of People's Party of Punjab.

He contested from Maur in 2022 as an Independent politician under the broader Sanyukt Samaj Morcha coalition led by farmers' union leader Balbir Singh Rajewal. Sidhana came in second place, being defeated by Sukhveer Singh Maiserkhana.

Sidhana contested from Bathinda in 2024 Indian general election on the ticket of Shiromani Akali Dal (Amritsar), while not officially joining the party. He came in fifth place with 7.36% of the total vote share.

He officially joined Akali Dal (Waris Punjab De) on 15 January 2026.

== Electoral performance ==
Punjab Assembly election, 2012: Rampura Phul
Party	Candidate	Votes	%	±%
SAD	Sikandar Singh Maluka	58,141	45.80	▼0.73
INC	Gurpreet Singh Kangar	53,005	41.76	▼6.68
PPoP	Lakhvir Singh Sidhana	10,065	7.93	New entry
BSP	Randhir Singh	1,454	1.15	▼0.07
Independent	Dr. Amarjit Singh	1,304	1.03	New entry
Majority		5,136	4.05	
Turnout		126,933	87.22	
Registered electors		145,535		
SAD gain from INC		Swing		

Punjab Assembly election, 2022: Maur
Party	Candidate	Votes	%	±%
AAP	Sukhveer Singh Maiserkhana	63,099	46.37	▲0.82
SSM	Lakhvir Singh Sidhana	28,091	20.90	New entry
SAD	Jagmeet Singh Brar	23,355	17.30	▼17.51
INC	Manoj Bala Bansal	15,034	11.20	▼5.68
BJP	Dayal Sodhi	3,418	2.50	New entry
NOTA	None of the above	1,351	0.8	
Majority		35,008	25.73	
Turnout		136,081	80.6	
Registered electors		168,910		
AAP hold				

2024 Indian general election: Bathinda
Party	Candidate	Votes	%	±%
SAD	Harsimrat Kaur Badal	376,558	32.71	▼8.81
AAP	Gurmeet Singh Khuddian	326,902	28.40	▲17.21
INC	Jeet Mohinder Singh Sidhu	202,011	17.55	▼21.75
BJP	Parampal Kaur Sidhu	110,762	9.62	New entry
SAD(A)	Lakha Sidhana	84,684	7.36	New entry
NOTA	None of the Above	4,933	0.43	▼0.67
Majority		49,656	4.31	▲2.50
Turnout		1,151,170		
Registered electors		16,51,188		
SAD hold		Swing	▼8.81	
