= Farmers' Union =

Farmers' Union or Farmers Union may refer to

- Farmers Union (brand), food brand
- Farmers Union Iced Coffee, flavoured milk drink
- Farmers' Union of Canada, farmers organization in Canada
- Farmers' Union of Wales, member organisation
- Indian Farmers' Union or Bharatiya Kisan Union, Indian farmers' representative organization
- Bharatiya Kisan Union Arajnaitik, another farmer's union in India
- Latvian Farmers' Union, political party in Latvia
- New Farmers' Union, political party in Latvia in the inter-war period
- New Zealand Farmers Union, now known as Federated Farmers
- Queensland Farmers' Union, political party of Australia
- Southern Tenant Farmers Union, civil farmer's union in the Southern United States
- Ulster Farmers' Union, member organisation for farmers in Northern Ireland
- Victorian Farmers' Union, association of farmers in the Australian state of Victoria

== See also ==
- National Farmers Union (disambiguation)
- Kisan Sabha (disambiguation)
