= Zira Assembly constituency =

Legislative Assembly constituency in Punjab State, India

Coordinates: 30.97°N 74.99°E

Zira
- Constituency No. 75 for the Punjab Legislative Assembly

Constituency details
- Country: India
- State: Punjab
- District: Firozpur
- Lok Sabha constituency: Khadoor Sahib
- Established: 1957
- Total electors: 188,313
- Reservation: None

Member of Legislative Assembly
- 16th Punjab Legislative Assembly
- Incumbent Naresh Kataria
- Party: Aam Aadmi Party
- Elected year: 2022

Zira Assembly constituency is one of the 117 Legislative Assembly constituencies of Punjab state in India. It is part of Firozpur district. In 2022, Naresh Kataria became MLA from this constituency.

== Members of the Legislative Assembly ==
Most successful parties from Zira Vidhan Sabha
1. SAD (8 Times) (50.0%)
2. INC (6 Times) (37.5%)
3. AAP (1 Time) (6.25%)
4. AD – SFS (1 Time) (6.25%)

Year	Member	Party
1957	Gurdit Singh	Indian National Congress
1957	Jaswant Kaur	Indian National Congress
1962	Jagjit Singh	Shiromani Akali Dal
1967	Hari Singh Zira	Akali Dal – Sant Fateh Singh Group
1969	Metab Singh	Indian National Congress
1972	Nasib Singh	Indian National Congress
1977	Hari Singh Zira	Shiromani Akali Dal
1980	Harcharan Singh Hero	Shiromani Akali Dal
1985	Hari Singh Zira	Shiromani Akali Dal
1992	Inderjit Singh	Shiromani Akali Dal
1997	Inderjit Singh	Shiromani Akali Dal
2002	Hari Singh Zira	Shiromani Akali Dal
2007	Naresh Kataria	Indian National Congress
2012	Hari Singh Zira	Shiromani Akali Dal
2017	Kulbir Singh Zira	Indian National Congress
2022	Naresh Kataria	Aam Aadmi Party

== Election results ==
=== 2027 ===
Punjab Assembly election, 2027: Zira
Party	Candidate	Votes	%	±%
AAP				
AD (WPD)				New entry
INC				
BSP				
SAD				
BJP				
NOTA	None of the above			
Majority				
Turnout				

=== 2022 ===
Punjab Assembly Election 2022: Zira
Party	Candidate	Votes	%	±%
AAP	Naresh Kataria	64,034	42.35	
SAD	Janmeja Singh Sekhon	41,258	27.29	
INC	Kulbir Singh Zira	40,615	26.86	
BJP	Avtar Singh Zira	2,007	1.33	
NOTA	None of the above	676	0.45%	
Majority		22,776	15.06	
Turnout				
Registered electors		188,313		

=== 2017 ===
Punjab Assembly election, 2017: Zira
Party	Candidate	Votes	%	±%
INC	Kulbir Singh Zira	69,899	46.2	
SAD	Hari Singh Zira	46,828	30.9	
AAP	Gurpreet Singh	30,947	20.4	
NOTA	None of the above	622	0.3	
Majority		23,071	15.3	
Turnout		150,751	85.1	
Registered electors		177,912		

=== Previous results ===
Year	A C No.	Category	Winner	Party	Votes	Runner Up	Party	Votes
1957	62	(ST	Gurdit Singh	INC	27412	Des Raj	CPI	12651
1957	62	(ST)	Jaswant Kaur	INC	32555	Darbara Singh	IND	24423
1962	84	GEN	Jagjit Singh	AD	22904	Gurdit Singh	INC	11145
1967	11	GEN	Hari Singh	SAD	21494	Metab Singh	INC	20622
1969	11	GEN	Metab Singh	INC	24176	Gurdev Singh	SAD	19157
1972	11	GEN	Nasib Singh	INC	17294	Harcharan Singh	IND	16342
1977	97	GEN	Hari Singh	SAD	26976	Nasib Singh Gill	INC	17720
1980	97	GEN	Harcharan Singh Hero	SAD	28459	Raghbir Singh	INC(I)	25521
1985	97	GEN	Hari Singh	SAD	35580	Harcharan Singh Hero	INC	26625
1992	97	GEN	Inderjit Singh	SAD	16422	Harcharan Singh	INC	8479
1997	97	GEN	Inderjit Singh	SAD	59635	Naresh Kumar	INC	40037
2002	97	GEN	Hari Singh	SAD	43991	Kuldeep Singh	INC	36424
2007	96	GEN	Naresh Kumar	INC	64903	Hari Singh	SAD	52531
2012	75	GEN	Hari Singh	SAD	71389	Naresh Kataria	INC	59422

== See also ==
- List of constituencies of the Punjab Legislative Assembly
- Firozpur district
