= Kisan Sabha =

Kisan Sabha (transl. Farmers' Union) may refer to:

- Kisan Sabha (1919–1922), farmers' movement in British India
- All India Kisan Sabha, farmers' wing of Communist Party of India, begun in 1936
  - All India Kisan Sabha delegation to Europe, 1955
- All India Kisan Sabha (36 Canning Lane), farmers' wing of the Communist Party of India (Marxist)

== See also ==
- Farmers' Union (disambiguation)
