= Gurnam Singh Charuni =

Indian politician

- Born: 1959 (age 66–67); Charuni Jattan village, Shahbad, Kurukshetra district, Haryana, India
- Other name: Gurnam Singh Chaduni
- Occupations: Farmer protestor; politician
- Years active: 1990-present
- Known for: Farmer's Protest
- Spouse: Balwinder Kaur
- Children: 2

Gurnam Singh Charuni (also spelt Gurnam Singh Chaduni; born 1959) is a farm union leader and politician in the Indian states of Haryana and Punjab. He is the chief of the Bharatiya Kisan Union (BKU) in Haryana, and the founder of Sanyukt Sangharsh Party.

== Early life ==
Gurnam Singh was born in Charuni Jattan village in Shahbad, Kurukshetra district, Haryana in 1959. As per customs, he uses his village name. He has six siblings, and started helping his family with farming on failing his tenth standard.

== Activism ==
In 2008 he successfully led a campaign for the farm loan waiver. In 2019 he protested with other farmers demanding the government purchase their sunflower crop.

He participated as one of the leaders in the 2020–2021 Indian farmers' protest.

== Politics ==
In 2019, Charhuni had contested Haryana State Legislative assembly elections from the Ladwa (Vidhan Sabha constituency). His party Sanyukat Sangarsh Party Gurnam Singh Charuni#Sanyukt Sangharsh Party contested on 10 seats in 2022 Punjab Legislative Assembly elections but failed to leave any impact on voters. Charhuni was contesting in 2024 Haryana assembly elections from Pehowa seat under his home district Kurukshetra.

== Sanyukt Sangharsh Party ==
Sanyukt Sangharsh Party
- Abbreviation: SSP
- Leader: Gurnam Singh Charuni
- Founder: Gurnam Singh Charuni
- Founded: 18 December 2021; 4 years ago
- Ideology: Agrarianism
- Political position: Centre
- Colours: Green
- Alliance: Sanyukt Samaj Morcha in Punjab

Election symbol
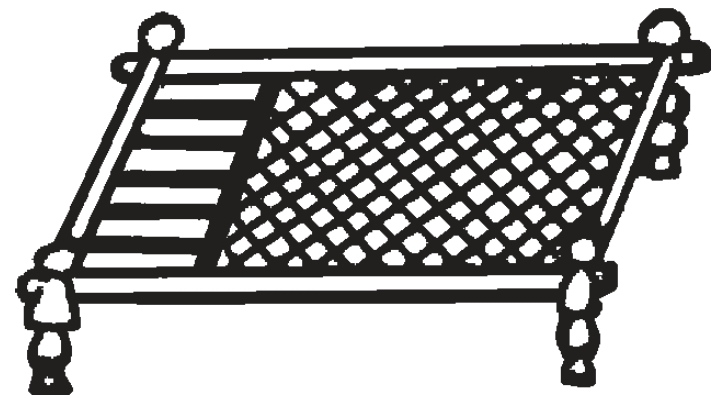

In 2020, after the Passing of three farm laws by Parliament of India there was a huge protest against it. Gurnam Singh Charuni was one of the leaders of the Samyukta Kisan Morcha. He was of the view that the farmers organisation must contest election to fulfill the demands of the farmers.

Gurnam Singh Chaduni launched his political party called Sanyukt Sangharsh Party on 18 December 2021. Party plans to contest in all 117 Punjab Legislative Assembly seats in the 2022 Punjab Legislative Assembly election. Later on he merged with the Sanyukt Samaj Morcha (a political party; consisting of 22 farmer organizations, that were in the Farmer's Protest with Chaduni) and will contest 10 seats.
