= Jagmeet =

Jagmeet is a given name of Indian origin. Notable people with the name include:

- Jagmeet Singh (born 1979), Canadian lawyer and politician
- Jagmeet Singh Brar (born 1958), Indian politician, lawyer, writer, and poet
