= Gurpartap Singh Mann =

Indian infrastructure professional and former public official

- Born: 11 April 1968 (age 58); Batala, Punjab, India
- Education: Guru Nanak Dev Engineering College; University Business School, Panjab University
- Occupations: Infrastructure professional and former public official
- Father: Bhupinder Singh Mann

Gurpartap Singh Mann is an Indian infrastructure professional and former public official. He served as a member of the Punjab Public Service Commission (PPSC) from 2018 to 2024. He previously worked at the Punjab Infrastructure Development Board (PIDB), where he became chief general manager, and held organisational and spokesperson roles in the Punjab Pradesh Congress Committee (PPCC).

== Early life and family ==
Mann was born in Batala, Punjab, to Sukhinder Kaur Mann and Bhupinder Singh Mann, a farmers' leader and former member of the Rajya Sabha.

Family records trace Mann to the family of General Sardar Kahan Singh Mann, also rendered as Kahn Singh Man, through Kahan Singh's brother Sardar Bhag Singh Mann. The recorded line continues through Bhag Singh's son Bhagwan Singh's son Gopal Singh, Gopal Singh's son Anoop Singh, and Anoop Singh's son Bhupinder Singh Mann. Kahan Singh served in the army of Maharaja Ranjit Singh, became a general, and was appointed governor of Multan in 1848. His attempted assumption of authority at Multan occurred during the events that led to the Second Anglo-Sikh War. Kahan Singh Mann %vas the son of Sardar Hukam Singh, village Sarhala, Thana MahUpur, District Hoshiarpur. He was appointed commandant of Maharaja Ranjit Singh’s body-guard at a comparatively young age; Later he rose to the rank of a general. The Maharaja held his family in high esteem and often used to .'••ny that Mann Sardars were his "Wari-da-Tewar” i e, best suit of clothes.

An historical listing of the bungas in the precincts of the Golden Temple associates the family with “Bunga Tara Singh, Kahan Singh Mann”. Mann's grandfather, Sardar Anoop Singh Mann, was associated with Chak No. 207 RB in the former Lyallpur District, a locality that continues to be known as Chak 207 Anoop Singh Wala. Following the partition of India in 1947, the family moved from Lyallpur, now Faisalabad in Pakistan, to Batala in Indian Punjab.

Mann studied mechanical engineering at Guru Nanak Dev Engineering College in Ludhiana and later received an MBA from University Business School, Panjab University, Chandigarh.

== Professional career ==
Mann began his professional career with Swaraj Engines and subsequently worked at the Punjab State Industrial Development Corporation. He joined PIDB in 1999 and served there in a succession of managerial roles, becoming chief general manager in 2007. Contemporary reports identified him as PIDB's chief general manager in connection with Punjab government infrastructure projects developed through public–private partnership arrangements, including an inter-state expressway, bus terminals, and a wider programme of proposed infrastructure development. He left PIDB in December 2010.

In February 2018, a selection committee headed by the chief minister of Punjab recommended Mann for appointment as a member of the PPSC. He served a six-year term, which ended on 12 March 2024.

== Political involvement ==
Before joining the PPSC, Mann was active in the Indian National Congress in Punjab. He served as a Secretary of the Punjab Congress (PPCC) and, in May 2015, was appointed the founding chairman of its social media cell. In 2016, he was included in a party team formed to study policy issues before the Punjab Legislative Assembly election, and was subsequently named to the PPCC manifesto committee chaired by Rajinder Kaur Bhattal, with Manpreet Singh Badal as co-chair.

Mann also served as a PPCC spokesperson. In 2021, The Tribune described him as a former chief spokesperson of the Punjab Congress before his appointment to the PPSC.
