= NFU =

NFU is a three-letter initialism which may stand for:

- Nanjing Forestry University, a university in Nanjing, China
- National Farmers Union (disambiguation), in several countries
- National Film Unit, a New Zealand film production company
- National Formosa University, a university in Taiwan
- New Foundations with urelements, an axiomatic set theory in mathematical logic
- No first use, a nuclear pledge or policy
- North Ferriby United F.C., an English football team
- National Froebel Union, a fore-runner of the National Froebel Foundation
