= Maur Assembly constituency =

Legislative Assembly constituency in Punjab State, India

Coordinates: 30.07°N 75.23°E

Maur
- Constituency No. 95 for the Punjab Legislative Assembly

Constituency details
- Country: India
- State: Punjab
- District: Bathinda
- Lok Sabha constituency: Bathinda
- Established: 2012
- Total electors: 167,547
- Reservation: None

Member of Legislative Assembly
- 16th Punjab Legislative Assembly
- Incumbent Sukhveer Maisarkhana
- Party: Aam Aadmi Party
- Elected year: 2022

Maur Assembly constituency is one of the 117 Legislative Assembly constituencies of Punjab state in India representing Maur. It is part of Bathinda district. The constituency was created and went for election for the first time in 2012.

== Members of the Legislative Assembly ==
Most successful parties from Maur Vidhan Sabha
1. AAP (2 Times) (40.0%)
2. SAD (2 Times) (40.0%)
3. INC (1 Time) (20.0%)

Year	Member	Party
As part of PEPSU Legislative Assembly (1951–56)
1952	Bhupinder Singh	Shiromani Akali Dal
1954	Shamsher Singh	Indian National Congress
Constituency defunct (1956-2012)
As part of Punjab Legislative Assembly (2012–Present)
Created from Joga Assembly constituency
2012	Janmeja Singh Sekhon	Shiromani Akali Dal
2017	Jagdev Singh Kamalu	Aam Aadmi Party
2022	Sukhveer Singh Maiserkhana	Aam Aadmi Party

== Election results ==
=== 2027 ===
Punjab Assembly election, 2027: Maur
Party	Candidate	Votes	%	±%
AAP				
AD (WPD)				New entry
INC				
BSP				
SAD				
BJP				
NOTA	None of the above			
Majority				
Turnout				

=== 2022 ===
Punjab Assembly election, 2022: Maur
Party	Candidate	Votes	%	±%
AAP	Sukhveer Singh Maiserkhana	63,099	46.37	▲0.82
SSM	Lakhvir Singh Sidhana	28,091	20.90	New entry
SAD	Jagmeet Singh Brar	23,355	17.30	▼17.51
INC	Manoj Bala Bansal	15,034	11.20	▼5.68
BJP	Dayal Sodhi	3,418	2.50	New entry
NOTA	None of the above	1,351	0.8	
Majority		35,008	25.73	
Turnout		136,081	80.6	
Registered electors		168,910		
AAP hold				

=== 2017 ===
Punjab Assembly election, 2017: Maur
Party	Candidate	Votes	%	±%
AAP	Jagdev Singh Kamalu	62,282	45.55	New entry
SAD	Janmeja Singh Sekhon	47,605	34.81	▼2.31
INC	Harminder Singh Jassi	23,087	16.88	▼19.11
NOTA	None of the above	853	0.62	
Majority		14,677	10.7	
Turnout		136,740	84.5	
Registered electors		162,830		
AAP gain from SAD		Swing		

=== 2012 ===
Punjab Assembly election, 2012: Maur
Party	Candidate	Votes	%	±%
SAD	Janmeja Singh Sekhon	45,349	37.12	New entry
INC	Mangat Rai Bansal	43,962	35.99	New entry
PPoP	Manpreet Singh Badal	26,398	21.61	New entry
Majority		1,387	1.1	
Turnout		1,22,163	85.3	
SAD win (new seat)				

== See also ==
- List of constituencies of the Punjab Legislative Assembly
- Bathinda district
