= Bharatiya Kisan Union Arajnaitik =

Farmer's Union organization In India

- Abbreviation: BKUA
- Formation: 15 May 2022 (4 years ago)
- Legal status: Active
- Headquarters: Lucknow, Uttar Pradesh
- Region served: India
- National President: Rajesh singh chauhan
- National spokesperson: Dharmendra Malik
- Key people: Harinam Verma, Digambar Singh, Mangayram Tyagi, Rajveer Singh
- Website: www.bkua.org

Bharatiya Kisan Union Arajnaitik (abbreviated BKUA) (English: Indian Farmers' Union) is a farmer's representative organisation in India.The organization was formed on 15 May 2022 in Lucknow, Uttar Pradesh, whose president was appointed Rajesh Singh Chauhan.

== History ==
In Uttar Pradesh, on the occasion of the death anniversary of Mahendra Singh Tikait, the leader of the farmers' movement and organization in North India, there was a split in the Bharatiya Kisan Union. Many farmer leaders associated with the Bharatiya Kisan Union of Naresh Tikait and Rakesh Tikait have separated and formed a new organization Bharatiya Kisan Union Arajnaitik.

== See also ==
- Bharatiya Kisan Union
- Narmada Bachao Andolan
- All India Kisan Sabha
