= Samyukt Kisan Morcha =

Umbrella body of Indian farmers' unions

Sanyukt Kisan Morcha
- Abbreviation: SKM
- Formation: 7 November 2020 (5 years ago)
- Legal status: Active
- Region served: India
- Affiliations: All India Kisan Sangharsh Coordination Committee
- Website: Samyukt Kisan Morcha on X

Samyukta Kisan Morcha (SKM) (lit. 'Joint Farmers' Force' or 'United Farmers Front'), formed in November 2020, is a coalition of over four hundred Indian farmers' unions to coordinate satyagraha (non-violent resistance) against the three farm acts initiated by the central government in September of the same year.

In opposing the three farm laws, the SKM asserted that laws were an unwelcome imposition on the farmers, violated the constitution, were anti-farmer and pro-big business.

== History ==
The SKM formed in November 2020 is made up of over four hundred Indian farmers' unions. Its purpose is to oppose the three farm acts that the Narendra Modi led National Democratic Alliance (NDA) aims to implement. The farmers' method is Satyagraha (non-violent resistance) protest against the decision by three farm acts.

The SKM has held eleven rounds of talks with the government to repeal the three farm bills, and make law to guarantee minimum support price (MSP) for 23 crops without success.

=== Protest camps ===
In November, the SKM decided to take their protest to Delhi to draw attention to their cause. The protesters were not allowed to enter Delhi. They made plans to try to enter national highway. The number of farmers concentrated around the borders of Delhi grew. Police deployed against farmers, who remain peaceful cloistered in their make shift camps, are from MHA forces, Haryana, Delhi, and UP Police.

The largest concentration of farmers in Haryana are at Tikri, and Shingu-Kundli borders.

Similar action by the UP and Delhi police on the Delhi-UP border caused farmers to be concentrated in Ghazipur, and Chila (Noida-Delhi road), on the UP-Delhi border. Haryana police action on the Haryana and Rajasthan Border, caused farmers concentrations near Shahjahapur, where the farmers face the Haryana and the Rajasthan police.

These farmer's protests are opposed by police barricades, armed police and paramilitary forces. The protest sites have evolved into ramshackle camps of trolley tractors, tents and tarps. The farmers have remained without government, medical, electricity or civic support.

By January 2020, many protesting farmers had come in by rotation from Punjab and Haryana. Estimates of the camp populations in and around Delhi, mostly in Haryana, varied between 100,000 and 300,000. In addition to farmers' camps on the Delhi borders, there are farmer and SKM supporter gatherings in Palwal. This camp was caused by a decision of the Haryana Police to stop the protesters there.

On 26 January, Republic Day, the SKM held a rally and the protesters tried to enter New Delhi. There was a clash between the protesters and police, which lead to injuries on both sides and the death of one protester. The SKM claimed the peaceful protest had been sabotaged by outside groups. The day after the protesters where back at the camps on the edge of capital.

On 9 October 2021, Farmer unions termed the Lakhimpur Kheri massacre an "act of terror" that was part of a larger conspiracy to break the 10-month-old farmers’ protest. The union said that this "massacre" during the farmer's movement was analogous to the Jallianwala Bagh massacre during the Indian freedom movement. The unions and Samyukt Kisan Morcha (SKM) planned several protests calling for the immediate dismissal and arrest of Union minister of state for home, Ajay Mishra Teni, and his son Ashish.

=== 2022 state assembly elections ===
SKM campaigned against the ruling BJP by organizing public meetings and rallies asking farmers to not vote for BJP. SKM had organised the 2020–2021 Indian farmers' protest against the controversial three farm acts which were passed by the BJP-led Union Government in the BJP controlled Parliament of India in September 2020. These laws were eventually withdrawn by the Union government.

On 31 January 2022, the farmer leaders observed "Vishwasghat Diwas" (treachery day) across India after the Union government failed to fulfill promises that were made to the farmers during the withdrawal of agitation against three farm laws. SKM leaders have warned that the farm laws may be re-introduced if BJP wins the elections.

== Politics ==
They see the three farm acts as has unwelcome impositions on farmers, violating the constitution, being anti-farmer, and pro big business.

The members of Samyukta Kisan Morcha (SKM) and its supporters although ideologically diverse are united by their commitment to strategy of peaceful andolan (movement); and by the common minimum program of getting the Government to repeal the three farm acts, and make law to guarantee minimum support price (MSP) for 23 crops.

== Organization ==
The SKM coalition includes farmers’ Unions from Punjab, Haryana, Uttar Pradesh and other States. Other members include several regional affiliates of the Bhartiya Kisan Union (BKU), including BKU (Rakesh Tikait faction), BKU Lakhowal (Harinder Singh Lakhowal), BKU Dakaunda (Buta Singh Burjgill), BKU Doaba (Manjit Singh Rai), BKU-Sidhupur, BKU-Rajewal and BKU- Chaduni. Other farmer's organisations that form part of SKM include: Krantikari Kisan Union, Akhil Bharatiya Kisan Sabha (AIKS), Jamhoori Kisan Sabha (Kulwant Singh Sandhu), Kul Hind Kisan Federation (Prem Singh Bhangu), Satnam Singh Pannun, Punjab Kisan Union, SinghKrantikari Kisan Union and Swaraj India.

=== Coordination committee and leaders ===
Samyukta Kisan Morcha represents the farmers' union in talks with the government, issues statements on behalf of all the unions, and coordinates the strategy and tactics between the disparate groups. SKM has a seven-member coordination committee which coordinates the work of the 'Morcha', engages in outreach with other farmers' unions, decides and coordinates media policy, briefs the media, addresses press conferences, issues statements, decides on strategy and tactics of the movement, responds to government letters and actions.

The Seven Member Committee includes Jagjit Singh Dallewal (President BKU-Sidhupur), Dr. Darshan Pal (President Krantikari Kisan Union), Atul Kumar Anjan (National general secretary of All India Kisan Sabha), Hannan Mollah (National general secretary of All India Kisan Sabha (36 Canning Lane)); Balbir Singh Rajewal (president BKU-Rajewal), Ashok Dhawale (National President of All India Kisan Sabha), Yogendra Yadav (President and founder of Swaraj India), Gurnam Singh Chaduni, Shiv Kumar Kakka.

=== Legal advisers ===
The lawyers advising the movement in its negotiations with the Government, and Supreme court on issues of law include Colin Gonsalves, Dushyant Dave, Prashant Bhushan and H S Phoolka.

=== Supporters ===
Samyukta Kisan Morcha has relationships with over 500 national farm and workers' unions with which it coordinates its action. Protests echoing the demands of the SKM, and in coordination with its actions and programs have taken place in large number of states including Maharashtra, Rajasthan, Gujarat, Karnataka, Andhra Pradesh, Telangana, Tamil Nadu, Kerala, Assam, and Manipur. In addition, increasing number of trade union organizations have extended their support to program and actions of the SKM.

== See also ==
- Bharatiya Kisan Union
- 2020–2021 Indian farmers' protest
- 2021 Farmers' Republic day parade
- 2021 Republic Day Red Fort Incident
