= Joginder Singh Ugrahan =

Indian farm union activist (born 1945)

- Born: 1945 (age 80–81); Sunam, Punjab, India
- Monuments: Farmers' Protest
- Occupation: Farmer leader
- Years active: 2002–present
- Organization: Bharatiya Kisan Union (Ekta Ugrahan)

Joginder Singh Ugrahan is an Indian ex-army man, communist leader and farm union leader, was born in 1945 in Sunam, Punjab. He is president of farm union Bharatiya Kisan Union (Ekta Ugrahan) and one of the most popular farm leaders in the country. He founded Bharatiya Kisan Union (Ekta Ugrahan) in 2002.

== Early life ==
Ugrahan was born on 1945 in Sunam town of Sangrur, Punjab. He joined army in 1975 and later on he had to resign from army due to some family problems and started working in the fields after that. While working in fields, he realised that the corporations and government exploits farmers and labourers in rural areas, so, he decided to engage in protests and activities organised by farmer unions. In March 2021, Ugrahan was isolated following a positive COVID-19 test.

== Activism ==
Ugrahan participated as one of leaders in the 2020–2021 Indian farmers' protest. He leads Bharatiya Kisan Union's Ekta Ugrahan faction which had the largest contingent of farmers protesting at the borders of Delhi. He is recognized as a prominent leader of farmers in Punjab’s Malwa region, where he heads one of the area's most influential agricultural organizations.
