= Bhora Kalan =

- village
- Location in Uttar Pradesh, India Bhora Kalan (India)
- Coordinates: 29.39°N 77.45°E
- Country: India
- State: Uttar Pradesh
- District: Muzaffarnagar

Government
  - Body: Gram panchayat
- Elevation: 238 m (781 ft)

Languages
  - Official: Hindi Hindi. =
- Time zone: UTC+5:30 (IST)
- Postal code: 251319
- Vehicle registration: UP
- Website: up.gov.in

Bhora Kalan is a village in the Muzaffarnagar district of Uttar Pradesh, India. Kalan is a Persian language word meaning "big". Sometimes two villages of the same name are distinguished by the appellation Kalan or Khurd, meaning "small".

== See also ==
- Sisauli - nearby village
