= Sisauli =

- Town
- Location in Uttar Pradesh, India
- Coordinates: 29.42°N 77.47°E
- Country: India
- State: Uttar Pradesh
- District: Muzaffarnagar
- Block: Sahapur
- Elevation: 238 m (781 ft)

Population (2001)
  - Total: 15,171

Languages
  - Official: Hindi
- Time zone: UTC+5:30 (IST)
- Postal code: 251319
- Vehicle registration: UP-12
- Website: http://www.sisauli.co.gp, Facebook

Sisauli is a town and a Nagar Panchayat in Muzaffarnagar district in the Indian state of Uttar Pradesh. It is situated on Muzaffarnagar-Shamli border.

== History ==
Sisauli was the headquarters of Hindu Jat (Baliyan clan) principality during Mughal and British period which had its sway over Muzaffarnagar and Shamli districts of Uttar Pradesh.

== Geography ==
Sisauli is located at 29.42°N 77.47°E. It has an average elevation of 238 metres (780 feet). Sisauli in Google Maps

== Demographics ==
As of 2011 India census, Sisauli had a population of 15,245. Males constitute 54% of the population and females 46%. Sisauli has an average literacy rate of 58%, lower than the national average of 59.5%: male literacy is 67%, and female literacy is 46%. In Sisauli, 15% of the population is under 6 years of age. Sisauli is the center of the farmers' revolution against the price of the sugarcane and the other problems of farmers.

== Education ==
There are schools mostly associated with UP board. Well known schools are DAV Inter College(UP Board), Rajkiya Kanya Pathshala (UP Board), Janta Inter College (UP Board), Vaidic Inter College, Arya Samaj (UP Board), Moon Light Public School (CBSE), Bhakti Vedant Public School (CBSE), Shashwat Public School (CBSE), There is one degree college for girls, Mukhtyari Devi Kanya Mahavidyalaya associated to CCS.

== Renowned persons ==
- Chaudhary Mahendra Singh Tikait was a non-political leader of farmers. He was the head of a national body, Bharatiya Kisan Union and Baliyan Khap.
- Ch. Naresh Tikait is the head of Bhartiya Kisan Union after the death of Ch. Mahendra Singh Tikait.
- Ch.Rakesh Tikait is the younger son of late Ch. Mahender Singh Tikait. He is the leader of Bhartiya Kisan Union and is organising a protest Against the Three Farm Bill(2020).

== Important places ==
- Holi Chowk, is the centre of economical activities of village. Roads from every side of village here collide and create a chaotic condition, rush and shops. There is a Statue of Lord Shiva in the middle, probably covering an old well. Every year, Holi Dahan is done here. It is the only Dahan of the whole village and quite giant too.
- Kisan Bhawan, is the national headquarters of Bharatiya Kisan Union.
- Arya Samaj temple is the building in the center of village. It hosts the Salana Jalasa (Vaarshikotsav) of Arya Samaj and a lot of other activities too. It was established by "Punjab Kesri" Lala Lajpat Rai.
- Baba Kali Singh Mandir Where devotees comes on Sunday to Worship.

== Nearby villages ==
Shikarpur, Mundbhar, Bhora Khurd, Bhora Kalan, Alawalpur Majra, Khedi Sundiyan, Sawtoo, Hadoli Majra, Bhajju, Budina Kalan, Charoli, Kutba, Kutbi, Mohammadpur Madan, Sonta.
