= Naresh Kataria =

Indian politician

MLA, Punjab Legislative Assembly
- Incumbent
- Assumed office 2022
- Preceded by: Kulbir Singh Zira
- Constituency: Zira
- Majority: Aam Aadmi Party

Personal details
- Party: Aam Aadmi Party

Naresh Kataria is an Indian politician and the MLA representing the Zira Assembly constituency in the Punjab Legislative Assembly. He is a member of the Aam Aadmi Party. He was elected as the MLA in the 2022 Punjab Legislative Assembly election.

== Career ==
=== 2022 Punjab Legislative Assembly election ===
Kataria defeated Janmeja Singh Sekhon of Shiromani Akali Dal by 22,776 votes in the elections of 2022.

== Member of Legislative Assembly ==
He represents the Zira Assembly constituency as MLA in Punjab Assembly. The Aam Aadmi Party gained a strong 79% majority in the sixteenth Punjab Legislative Assembly by winning 92 out of 117 seats in the 2022 Punjab Legislative Assembly election. MP Bhagwant Mann was sworn in as Chief Minister on 16 March 2022.

Committee assignments of Punjab Legislative Assembly

- Member (2022–23) Committee on Privileges
- Member (2022–23) Committee on Questions & References

== Electoral performance ==
Punjab Assembly Election 2022: Zira
Party	Candidate	Votes	%	±%
AAP	Naresh Kataria	64,034	42.35	
SAD	Janmeja Singh Sekhon	41,258	27.29	
INC	Kulbir Singh Zira	40,615	26.86	
BJP	Avtar Singh Zira	2,007	1.33	
NOTA	None of the above	676	0.45%	
Majority		22,776	15.06	
Turnout				
Registered electors		188,313		

State Legislative Assembly
Preceded by -	Member of the Punjab Legislative Assembly from Zira Assembly constituency 2022 –	Incumbent
