= Hari Singh Zira =

Indian politician

Jathedar Hari Singh Zira

MLA, Punjab
- In office 2002 - 2007
- Preceded by: Inderjit Singh
- Succeeded by: Naresh Kumar
- Constituency: Zira
- In office 2012 - 2017
- Preceded by: Naresh Kumar
- Succeeded by: Kulbir Singh Zira
- Constituency: Zira

Personal details
- Party: Shiromani Akali Dal
- Children: Avatar Singh

Hari Singh Zira was an Indian politician and belonged to the Shiromani Akali Dal. He was a member of Punjab Legislative Assembly and represented Zira.

He died following a cardiac arrest on August 4, 2020.

== Family ==
His father's name is Jaswant Singh. He has a son (Avtar Singh).

== Political career ==
Zira was elected to Punjab Legislative Assembly from Zira constituency in 2002. In 2007, he lost to Congress candidate Naresh Kumar.
