= Jagdev Singh Kamalu =

Jagdev Singh Kamalu is a politician from Punjab. He is MLA from Maur constituency (Number 95). He contested from Aam Aadmi Party in the year 2017 and won, defeating the incumbent MLA Janmeja Singh Sekhon. In 2021, Kamalu rebelled and moved to Indian National Congress.

State Legislative Assembly
Preceded by Janmeja Singh Sekhon (SAD)	Member of the Punjab Legislative Assembly from Maur Assembly constituency 2017 – 2022	Succeeded by Sukhveer Singh Maiserkhana (AAP)
