= Jagmeet Singh Brar =

Indian politician and writer (born 1958)

Personal details
- Born: 23 May 1958 (age 68) Bam, India
- Party: Bharatiya Janata Party
- Other political affiliations: Shiromani Akali Dal; All India Trinamool Congress; Indian National Congress
- Occupation: Politician, lawyer, writer, poet

Jagmeet Singh Brar (born 23 May 1958 in Bam, Muktsar District, Punjab) is an Indian politician, lawyer, writer and poet who belonged to the Bharatiya Janata Party. He represents the Lokhit Abhiyan political party.

== Education ==
He holds an M.A. and LL.B. from Punjabi University in Patiala.

== Political career ==
Brar started his career as a student leader under the guidance of his father, Gurmit Singh Brar, former Cabinet Minister, Punjab.

He served as president of the All India Sikh Student Federation. He was imprisoned during emergency from 1975 to 1977 as a student leader studying at Government College, Muktsar in Punjab and courted arrest many times on political issues. He spent seven months in Bathinda jail from 1979 to 1980 against Akali government. A case was registered against him for leading a Kisan movement in Faridkot.

He contested many tough elections against stalwarts like Parkash Singh Badal from Gidderbaha in 1980 and 1984. In 1980, he was only 22 years old and fought assembly election against Parkash Singh Badal from Gidderbaha. He finally gained success and was elected to the 10th Lok Sabha in 1992 and to the 13th Lok Sabha in 1999, representing the constituency of Faridkot in Punjab, on a Congress Party ticket. In 1999, he defeated Sukhbir Singh Badal, when Parkash Singh Badal was the Chief Minister of Punjab. This was considered a huge victory because the wave was anti-Congress. Despite being a national leader, he narrowly lost the 2004 and 2009 Lok Sabha polls from two local leaders. He did not contest the 2014 Lok Sabha polls but actively campaigned through the state.

He remained Member of the Congress Working Committee from 2005 to 2012, first as a special invitee and then a permanent invitee to the working committee. He was also in-charge of the Goa Congress, briefly. Brar quit Congress party on 5 January 2015 due to his differences with the Congress party leadership at Centre and Punjab level after serving the party for a long period of over 35 years.

During his tenure of Lok Sabha MP from Faridkot (1992 and 1999), he raised various issues regarding 1984 Genocide, Punjab's rivers, Punjab's capital and regarding farming. His work was much appreciated and people of Punjab named him as "Awaz-E-Punjab".

After quitting the INC, he joined the All India Trinamool Congress (AITC) and was the president for the state of Punjab. An alliance between the AITC and Aam Aadmi Party (AAP) was on the cards but it did not materialise. Finally, he fielded a few candidates in the 2017 Punjab Vidhan Sabha elections but none of them won. On 25 January 2017, he quit the Trinamool Congress owing to differences with Party Supremo Mamata Banerjee over Punjab related issues. Currently, he is working independently with his close group of associates which also includes former MLAs like Ripjit Brar, Vijay Sathi and more known faces of Punjab politics.

On 19 April 2019 he joined Shiromani Akali Dal in the presence of Supremo Parkash Singh Badal, President Sukhbir Singh Badal and Union Minister Harsimrat Kaur Badal. Subsequently, he was appointed the senior vice president of the party. On 1 September 2021 he was declared as MLA candidate by SAD from Maur Assembly Constituency for 2022 elections.

== Electoral performance ==
Punjab Assembly election, 2022: Maur
Party	Candidate	Votes	%	±%
AAP	Sukhveer Singh Maiserkhana	63,099	46.37	▲0.82
SSM	Lakhvir Singh Sidhana	28,091	20.90	New entry
SAD	Jagmeet Singh Brar	23,355	17.30	▼17.51
INC	Manoj Bala Bansal	15,034	11.20	▼5.68
BJP	Dayal Sodhi	3,418	2.50	New entry
NOTA	None of the above	1,351	0.8	
Majority		35,008	25.73	
Turnout		136,081	80.6	
Registered electors		168,910		
AAP hold				
