= Sukhveer Singh Maiserkhana =

Indian politician

MLA, Punjab Legislative Assembly
- Incumbent
- Assumed office 2022
- Preceded by: Jagdev Singh Kamalu (AAP)
- Constituency: Maur
- Majority: Aam Aadmi Party

Personal details
- Born: Maisarkhana
- Party: Aam Aadmi Party

Sukhveer Singh Maiserkhana is an Indian politician and the MLA representing the Maur Assembly constituency in the Punjab Legislative Assembly. He is a member of the Aam Aadmi Party. He was elected as the MLA in the 2022 Punjab Legislative Assembly election.

== Member of Legislative Assembly ==
He represents the Maur Assembly constituency as MLA in Punjab Assembly. The Aam Aadmi Party gained a strong 79% majority in the sixteenth Punjab Legislative Assembly by winning 92 out of 117 seats in the 2022 Punjab Legislative Assembly election. MP Bhagwant Mann was sworn in as Chief Minister on 16 March 2022.

Committee assignments of Punjab Legislative Assembly

- Member (2022–23) Committee on Public Accounts
- Member (2022–23) Committee on Government Assurances

== Electoral performance ==
Punjab Assembly election, 2022: Maur
Party	Candidate	Votes	%	±%
AAP	Sukhveer Singh Maiserkhana	63,099	46.37	
SSM	Lakha Singh Sidhana	28,091	20.9	
SAD	Jagmeet Singh Brar	23,355	17.3	
INC	Manoj Bala Bansal	15,034	11.20	
BJP	Dayal Sodhi	3,418	2.5	
NOTA	None of the above	1,351	0.8	
Majority		35,008	25.73	
Turnout		136,081	80.6	
Registered electors		168,910		
AAP hold				

State Legislative Assembly
Preceded by Jagdev Singh Kamalu (AAP)	Member of the Punjab Legislative Assembly from Maur Assembly constituency 2022 –	Incumbent
