= National Farmers Union =

National Farmers Union may refer to:

- National Farmers Union (Canada)
- National Farmers' Union of England and Wales
- National Farmers Union of Fiji
- National Farmers' Union of Scotland
- National Farmers Union (United States)
- Kenya National Farmers Union

== See also ==
- National Union of Algerian Farmers
- National Farmers' Federation, Australia
- Ulster Farmers' Union
- Farmers Union Iced Coffee, Australia's largest selling flavoured milk
