= Narayanaswamy Naidu =

Indian agriculturist (1925–1984)

Chinnamanna Narayanaswamy Naidu (1925-1984) was a former president of the All India Farmers' Association & Tamil Nadu Agriculturists' Association and a farmers' leader. He was described as "a fiery fighter for the farmers" and as "buil[ding] up a formidable fighters' movement".

== Life ==
Naidu was born on 6 February 1925. He was from Vaiyampalayam in Coimbatore district. Naidu died on 21 December 1984, aged 59.

== Legacy ==
A memorial, a manimandapam, was constructed at Vaiyampalayam to the memory of Naidu.

In December 2020, the Tamil Nadu government announced that an award, named after Naidu, who strove for the rights of the farmers for many decades, will be given to farmers for obtaining the highest yield of paddy (unmilled rice) through the System of Rice Intensification. The award will be made annually during Republic Day celebrations.

In 2025, the electricity minister M. P. Saminathan announced that a railway bridge at Kurudampalayam would be named after Naidu. Other memorialisations in 1925, the hundredth anniversary of Naidu's death, included an arch planned in Vaiyampalayam. There is a statue of him in Perambalur. As part of the 2025 celebrations, he was described as "Tamil Nadu's beloved farmers' leader ... who dedicated his life to the welfare of farmers".
