= Kenya National Farmers Federation =

Representative organisation for farmers in the government of Kenya

The Kenya National Farmers Federation (KENAFF) is an umbrella organisation, created to represent, articulate, promote and protect the interests of Kenyan farmers through lobbying, advocacy, policy action and farmer empowerment.

== History ==
KENAFF was founded as the Kenya National Farmers' Union (KNFU) in 1947 to represent farmers to the government of Kenya. It was founded to lobby in support of farmers and protect farmers' interests. Members must pay a subscription fee. The organisation began admitting indigenous Kenyan farmers in 1973. Robert Bates, in his 1981 book Markets and States in Tropical Africa, uses the KNFU as an example of how large-scale farmers in 1976, who were disproportionately represented in the KNFU, had considerable clout in increasing prices paid by government marketing boards.. THE KNFU was first renamed the Kenya National Federation of Agricultural Producers (KENFAP) in 2003, and then in 2012 it finally became the Kenya National Farmers Federation.
