= Kulbir Singh Zira =

Indian politician

Member of the Punjab Legislative Assembly
- In office 11 March 2017 – 10 March 2022
- Preceded by: Hari Singh Zira
- Constituency: Zira, Punjab

Vice President of Punjab Youth Congress
- In office July 2015 – March 2020

Sarpanch of Basti Bute Wali
- In office 3 July 2013 – 30 December 2018

Personal details
- Born: 12 April 1980 (age 46) Basti Bute Wali Zira, Punjab
- Party: Indian National Congress
- Spouse: Manmeet Kaur
- Children: 2
- Website: Kulbir Singh Zira

Kulbir Singh Zira (born 12 April 1980) is an Indian politician. He was elected as the Member of the Legislative Assembly from Zira, Firozepur, Punjab to the Punjab Legislative Assembly he is also the Elected Vice President of the Punjab Youth Congress, the youth division of Indian National Congress. In May 2017, he got elected as an MLA .

== Electoral performance ==
Punjab Assembly election, 2017: Zira
Party	Candidate	Votes	%	±%
INC	Kulbir Singh Zira	69,899	46.2	
SAD	Hari Singh Zira	46,828	30.9	
AAP	Gurpreet Singh	30,947	20.4	
NOTA	None of the above	622	0.3	
Majority		23,071	15.3	
Turnout		150,751	85.1	
Registered electors		177,912		

Punjab Assembly Election 2022: Zira
Party	Candidate	Votes	%	±%
AAP	Naresh Kataria	64,034	42.35	
SAD	Janmeja Singh Sekhon	41,258	27.29	
INC	Kulbir Singh Zira	40,615	26.86	
BJP	Avtar Singh Zira	2,007	1.33	
NOTA	None of the above	676	0.45%	
Majority		22,776	15.06	
Turnout				
Registered electors		188,313		
