= National Union of Algerian Farmers =

Organization based in Algeria

National Union of Algerian Farmers (French: Union Nationale des Paysans Algériens, abbreviated as UNPA) is a farmers' organization in Algeria. UNPA was founded in 1973 and officially incorporated by the National Liberation Front (FLN), UNPA was one of the six major national mass organizations of the FLN period. The decision to set up UNPA had been taken by the Algerian government in 1972. The UNPA had great organizational complexity, having a number of affiliated and administrative bodies at the local and regional levels.

Compared to other national mass organizations of the FLN period (such as UGTA and UNJA) UNPA has less autonomy because the many of its ostensible functions were already taken over by the Ministry of Agriculture. Most farming lands had been nationalized under Houari Boumediène's presidency. The UNPA membership was made up by farmers who either had few or no noncollectivized lands. Since UNPA didn't have any legacy of independent union activity prior to its foundation and immediate incorporation into the political set-up of the dominant political party, UNPA proved less politically active, less cohesive, and less influential than some other contemporary Algerian mass organizations.

In April 1978, UNPA held a national congress, just ahead of the FLN party congress. The third UNPA congress was held in January 1982.

Under Chadli Bendjedid's presidency, there was a land privatization drive and the ownership of a major part of the nationalized lands were broken up. Some sectors broke away from UNPA, and formed their own unions after 1988. These groups raised demands for complete decollectivization. UNPA, on its behalf, has taken an ambiguous attitude towards land privatization. In 1995 it had supported privatizations, but this policy was later reversed. As of 2004, UNPA supported leasing and concessions of state lands, but not new forms of ownership.
