= All India Kisan Sabha delegation to Europe, 1955 =

In 1955 the All India Kisan Sabha sent a nine-member delegation to visit Czechoslovakia and Hungary for seven weeks. The delegation was hosted by agricultural workers' unions of those countries. The delegation consisted of Dasarath Deb, K.P.R. Gopalan, K.R. Patil (Peasants and Workers Party of India leader), Nana Patil, B. Srinivasa Rao, Y.V. Krishna Rao, Mohamed Abdulla Rasul, Yogendra Sharma and Harkishan Singh Surjeet.
