= Anti-national (India) =

Pejorative political label

Anti-national is a pejorative label and political catchphrase that has been widely used during the premiership of Narendra Modi, especially in media discourse. It is a connotation for anti-Indian sentiment in an Indian citizen, suggesting anti-government or seditious behavior (however outside of the sedition law Section 124A of the Indian Penal Code). In November 2021, a parliamentary panel sought a definition for "anti-national" from the union Ministry of Information and Broadcasting.

== See also ==
- Godi media
