= Balbir Singh Rajewal =

Indian farm union leader and politician

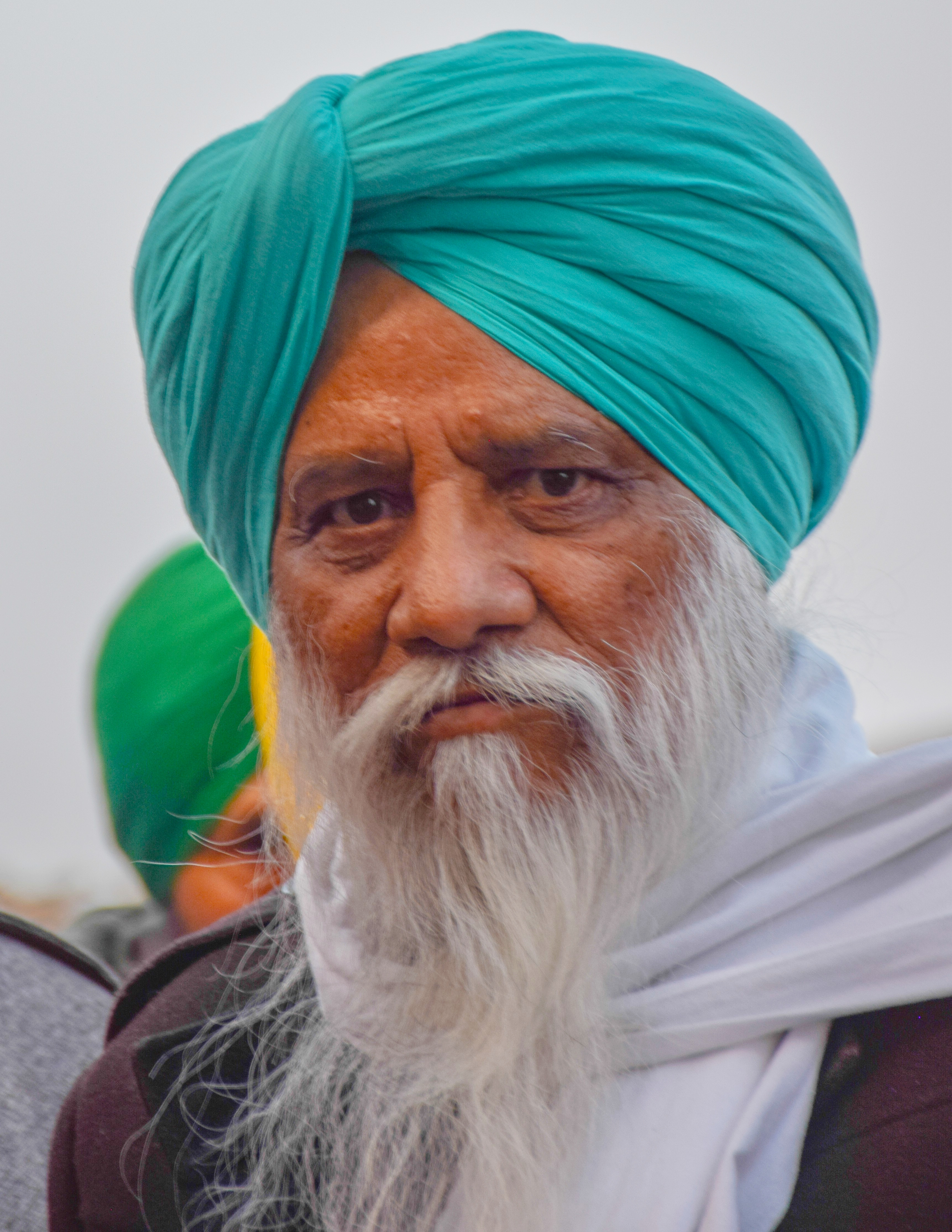
- Rajewal in 2021
- Born: 20 August 1943 (age 82); Ludhiana, Punjab, British India (present-day India)
- Occupations: Farmer protester; politician
- Political party: Sanyukt Samaj Morcha
- Movement: 2020–2021 Indian farmers' protest

Balbir Singh Rajewal (born 20 August 1943) is an Indian farm union leader and politician from Ludhiana, Punjab. He is founder of Bharatiya Kisan Union (Rajewal) and the Chief Ministerial candidate of Sanyukt Samaj Morcha party for the 2022 Punjab Legislative Assembly election. Rajewal is known for his active participation in 2020-2021 Indian farmers' protest.

== Early life ==
Rajewal was born on 20 August 1943. He started his career as a telegraphist in the post and telegraph department but in 1968 he resigned from his job.

== Farmer activist ==
In May 1972, Rajewal formed Punjab Khetibari Union with merger of 11 peasants groups in Chandigarh.

When in 1978, PKU transformed into Bharatiya Kisan Union, he was appointed Secretary of the Union. He is also credited with writing the Constitution of BKU. He also worked with Mahendra Singh Tikait and Sharad Anantrao Joshi. In 2009, he went on hunger strike and demanded relief for farmers under drought funds and succeeded in getting relief to farmers.

=== 2020 Farmers Protest ===
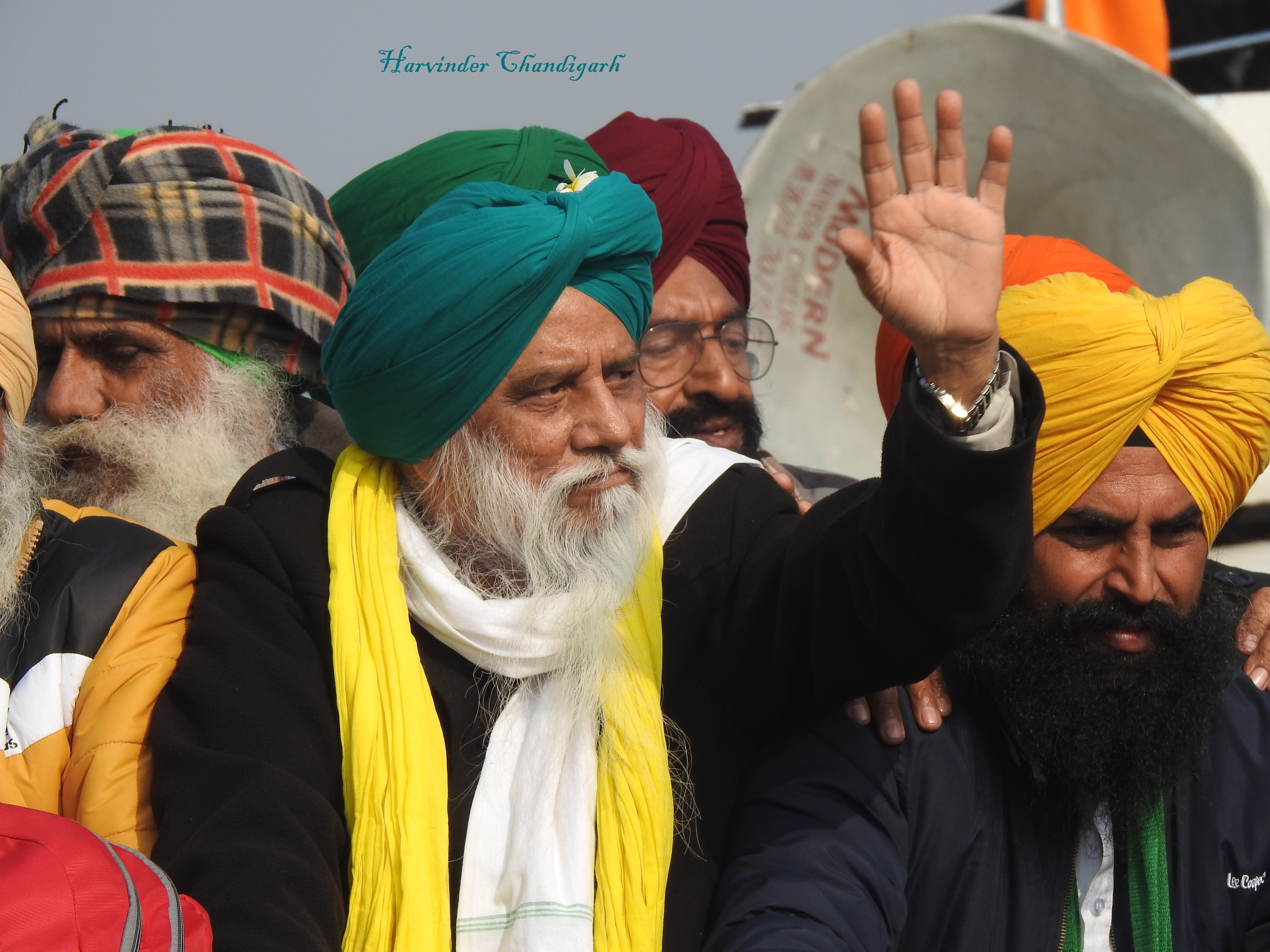
Rajewal during the farmers' protest

In 2020, Government of India passed three farm acts, along with other 31 Farmer Unions in Punjab, he started protest against these laws in Punjab and then at Singhu Border near Delhi at Haryana. He is also the member of Samyukt Kisan Morcha (SKM).

== Politics ==
Rajewal has been close to various political parties in past, including Shiromani Akali Dal, Indian National Congress, and Aam Aadmi Party, but didn't accept any official post. During 2020-2021 Farmers' protest, he was against any political participation.

After the withdrawal of Farm laws by Government of India in November 2021, the 22 Farm unions of Punjab broke away from the Sanyukt Kisan Morcha (SKM) and announced intentions to participate in 2022 Punjab Legislative Assembly election. Balbir Singh Rajewal has announced to be Chief Minister face of the new party named as Sanyukt Samaj Morcha. SKM has distanced itself from the new party and said it is not associated with SSM. The new party is not allowed to use the SKM banners.

== Sanyukt Samaj Morcha ==
Sanyukt Samaj Morcha
- Abbreviation: SSM
- Leader: Balbir Singh Rajewal
- Founder: Balbir Singh Rajewal
- Founded: 25 December 2021
- Headquarters: 92/C Bhagwanpur Road, Samrala, Ludhiana
- Ideology: Agrarianism
- Colours: Green
- Alliance: Sanyukt Sangharsh Party

Election symbol
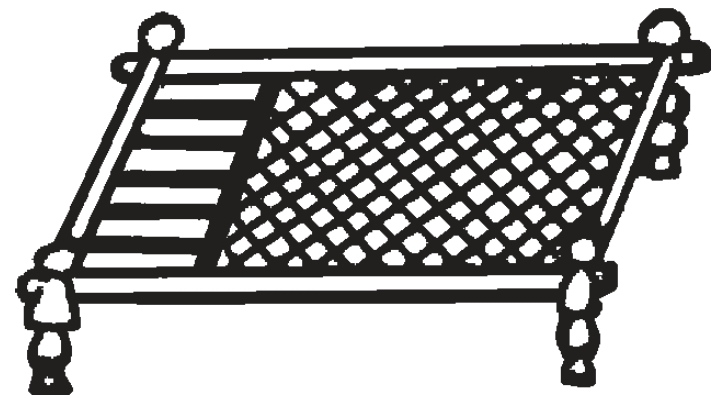

In 2020, after the passing of three farm laws by the Parliament of India, large protests against them took place. Until the suspension of the protests, all 32 Punjab Farm Unions were against any political participation.

After the Government announced the withdrawal of the three farm laws, 22 out 32 Punjab Farmer Unions announced their intention to participate in the 2022 Punjab Legislative Assembly election. Sanyukt Samaj Morcha a new political party was founded.

Balbir Singh Rajewal was selected as Chief Minister candidate. Samyukt Kisan Morcha has distanced itself from the new party and said it is not associated with SSM. The new party is not allowed to use the SKM banners.

The Election Commission of India registered the Morcha on 2 February 2022.

=== 2022 Punjab election ===
Sanyukt Samaj Morcha announced an alliance with the Sanyukt Sangharsh Party for the 2022 Punjab elections.

The Nawan Punjab Party’s President Dharamvir Gandhi extended his support to Morcha. The Marxist Communist Party of India (United) also extended their support to Morcha.

On 16 January 2022, the Aapna Punjab Party merged with Sanyukt Samaj Morcha. The Bhartiya Aarthik Party also later joined Sanyukt Samaj Morcha as well.

== See also ==
- Rakesh Tikait
