= Kisan Sabha movement (1919–1922) =

Indian protest movement

The Kisan Sabha movement (Peasant Association) was a protest movement in the present-day Indian state of Uttar Pradesh that took place between 1919 and 1922. It involved numerous agricultural caste groups. The Uttar Pradesh Kisan Sabha was formed in year 1918 in Lucknow by Gauri Shankar Mishra, Indra Narayan Dwivedi and Madan Mohan Malviya.
