= Janmeja Singh Sekhon =

Indian politician

MLA, Punjab
- In office 1997 - 2002
- Preceded by: Ravinder Singh (politician)
- Succeeded by: Ravinder Singh (politician)
- Constituency: Firozepur Cantonment
- In office 2007 - 2012
- Preceded by: Ravinder Singh (politician)
- Succeeded by: Joginder Singh (politician)
- Constituency: Firozepur Cantonment
- In office 2012 – 2017
- Preceded by: New Constituency
- Succeeded by: Jagdev Singh Kamalu (AAP)
- Constituency: Maur

Minister for Irrigation
- In office 2007 - 2015
- Chief Minister: Parkash Singh Badal
- Preceded by: Lal Singh (politician)

Personal details
- Party: Shiromani Akali Dal

Janmeja Singh Sekhon is an Indian politician and belongs to the Shiromani Akali Dal. He was Minister for PWD in the Punjab Government. He has been holding this post since 2007.

== Personal life ==
His father's name is Gurdit Singh. His brother Justice (retd) Jai Singh Sekhon is the Lokpal of Punjab. He has a son (Preetinder Singh Sekhon) and a daughter (Prabhleen Sekhon).

== Involvement in Irrigation Scam during SAD-BJP Government (2007–2017) ==
The Punjab Vigilance Bureau (VB) alleges that a contractor named Gurinder Singh was illegally awarded irrigation department contracts worth over ₹1,000–1,200 crore, largely at inflated rates, sometimes over 50% above departmental norms. This contract was sanctioned by Janmeja Singh Sekhon. The First Information Report (FIR) was registered on 17 August 2017, invoking the Prevention of Corruption Act and various sections of the Indian Penal Code (IPC). In September 2022, the government issued lookout circulars against Sekhon, Dhillon, and three retired IAS officials (Sarvesh Kaushal, KBS Sidhu, Kahan Singh Pannu) to prevent them from leaving the country amid the probe. 30–31 December 2022: Sekhon was questioned by VB for 7–8 hours, focusing on tender allotments, role of his office and staff, and alleged misuse of funds from 2007–2017.

== Political career ==
He was first elected for the Punjab Legislative Assembly in 1997 as an Akali Dal candidate from Firozepur Cantonment. He was again elected in 2007 from Firozepur Cantonment. In the Parkash Singh Badal government he was made Minister of Irrigation. In 2012 he successfully contested from new constituency Maur. In the new government, he retained Irrigation ministry.

== Electoral performance ==
Punjab Assembly election, 2012: Maur
Party	Candidate	Votes	%	±%
SAD	Janmeja Singh Sekhon	45,349	37.12	New entry
INC	Mangat Rai Bansal	43,962	35.99	New entry
PPoP	Manpreet Singh Badal	26,398	21.61	New entry
Majority		1,387	1.1	
Turnout		1,22,163	85.3	
SAD win (new seat)				

Punjab Assembly Election 2022: Zira
Party	Candidate	Votes	%	±%
AAP	Naresh Kataria	64,034	42.35	
SAD	Janmeja Singh Sekhon	41,258	27.29	
INC	Kulbir Singh Zira	40,615	26.86	
BJP	Avtar Singh Zira	2,007	1.33	
NOTA	None of the above	676	0.45%	
Majority		22,776	15.06	
Turnout				
Registered electors		188,313		

State Legislative Assembly
New seat	Member of the Punjab Legislative Assembly from Maur Assembly constituency 2012 – 2017	Succeeded by Jagdev Singh Kamalu (AAP)
