= Bhupinder Singh Mann =

Indian activist (born 1939)

Sardar Bhupinder Singh Mann (born 15 September 1939, Gujranwala) was nominated to the Rajya Sabha in 1990 by the Honorable President of India as recognition to his contribution to the farmers' struggle. He served from 1990 to 1996.

== Nominated to Rajya Sabha ==
In 1990, he was nominated to Rajya Sabha.

During his tenure as a Member of Parliament, he raised 118 starred or un-starred questions in the Rajya Sabha.

He was arrested along with hundreds of farmers while breaking un-announced restrictions on movement of wheat.

== Later activities ==
He did not participate in the farmer's protest in year 2020. He believed that the three farm laws were a step towards the much needed reforms in agriculture sector which were pending since 1991.

The Supreme court constituted a 4 member committee on 12.1.2021 to talk to the agitating farmers on the borders of Delhi. These included Bhupinder Singh Mann, leader of one of the factions of the Bharatiya Kisan Union, agricultural economist Ashok Gulati and Pramod Kumar Joshi, along with Anil Ghanwat of Shetkari Sangathana.

The farmer organizations refused to talk to the Committee constituted by the Supreme Court. In view of this, S. Bhupinder Singh Mann recused himself from the Committee on 14.1.2021. It is said that there was also intimidation from the political party sponsoring the protests and veiled threats from radicals elements. However, he said that the core objective of the committee was to talk to the protesting farmers who have refused to talk to the committee, hence the purpose of the committee is defeated.
