= Mahendra Singh Tikait =

Indian farmer rights activist (1935 –2011)

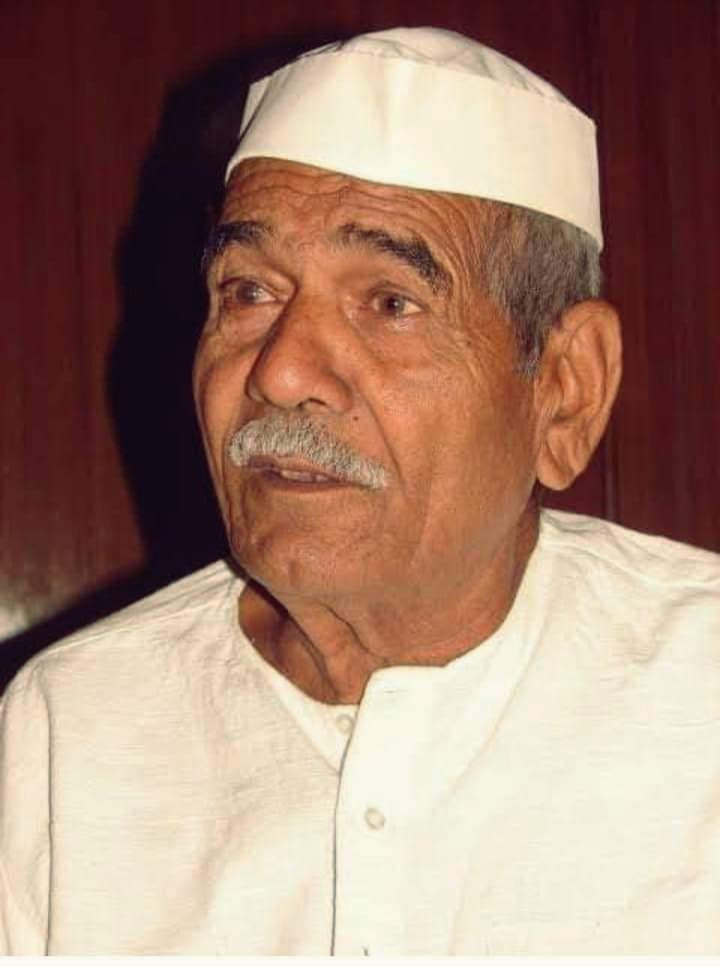
- Born: 6 October 1935; Sisauli, Uttar Pradesh, British India
- Died: 15 May 2011 (aged 75); Muzaffarnagar, Uttar Pradesh, India
- Other name: Baba Tikait
- Occupation: Farmer right's activist
- Organization: Bharatiya Kisan Union
- Spouse: Baljori Devi
- Children: 6; including Rakesh Tikait

Mahendra Singh Tikait (6 October 1935 – 15 May 2011) was an Indian farmer leader, activist, and president of the Bharatiya Kisan Union (BKU), an organisation advocating for farmers’ rights in India. Tikait emerged as a distinguished figure in the history of Indian agriculture, leading numerous large-scale farmers’ movements, particularly in Western Uttar Pradesh, to demand fair prices for crops, loan waivers, and better agricultural policies. Nicknamed as Baba Tikait, he played a noted role in Jat community leadership of northern India, He was also Chaudhary (head) of the Baliyan Khap.

== Early life ==
Tikait was born in Sisauli, Uttar Pradesh, he was instrumental in mobilising farmers across northern India, most notably through the 1988 Boat Club Rally in New Delhi.

== Career ==
Tikait first became a significant figure in 1987 when he organised a campaign in Muzaffarnagar demanding the waiving of electricity bills for farmers.

=== 1988 Boat Club Rally ===
In October 1988, Tikait led the Boat Club Rally in New Delhi, a landmark event in his career and Indian farmer activism. As president of the Bharatiya Kisan Union (BKU), Tikait mobilised approximately 500,000 farmers, primarily from western Uttar Pradesh, to protest at the Boat Club lawns near Parliament and occupied the entire stretch from Vijay Chowk to India Gate from 25 to 31 October. The rally demanded higher sugarcane prices, waivers for water and electricity dues, and tariff concessions, encapsulated in a 35-point charter. Farmers showcased rural life with bonfires, buffaloes, and traditional items, creating a powerful visual impact. Despite initial government resistance, including police firing at the Loni border that killed two farmers, Tikait’s leadership sustained the week-long protest. The Rajiv Gandhi government eventually conceded, with Uttar Pradesh chief minister N D Tiwari signing a pact before the 1989 general elections, granting key demands like utility bill waivers and higher crop prices.

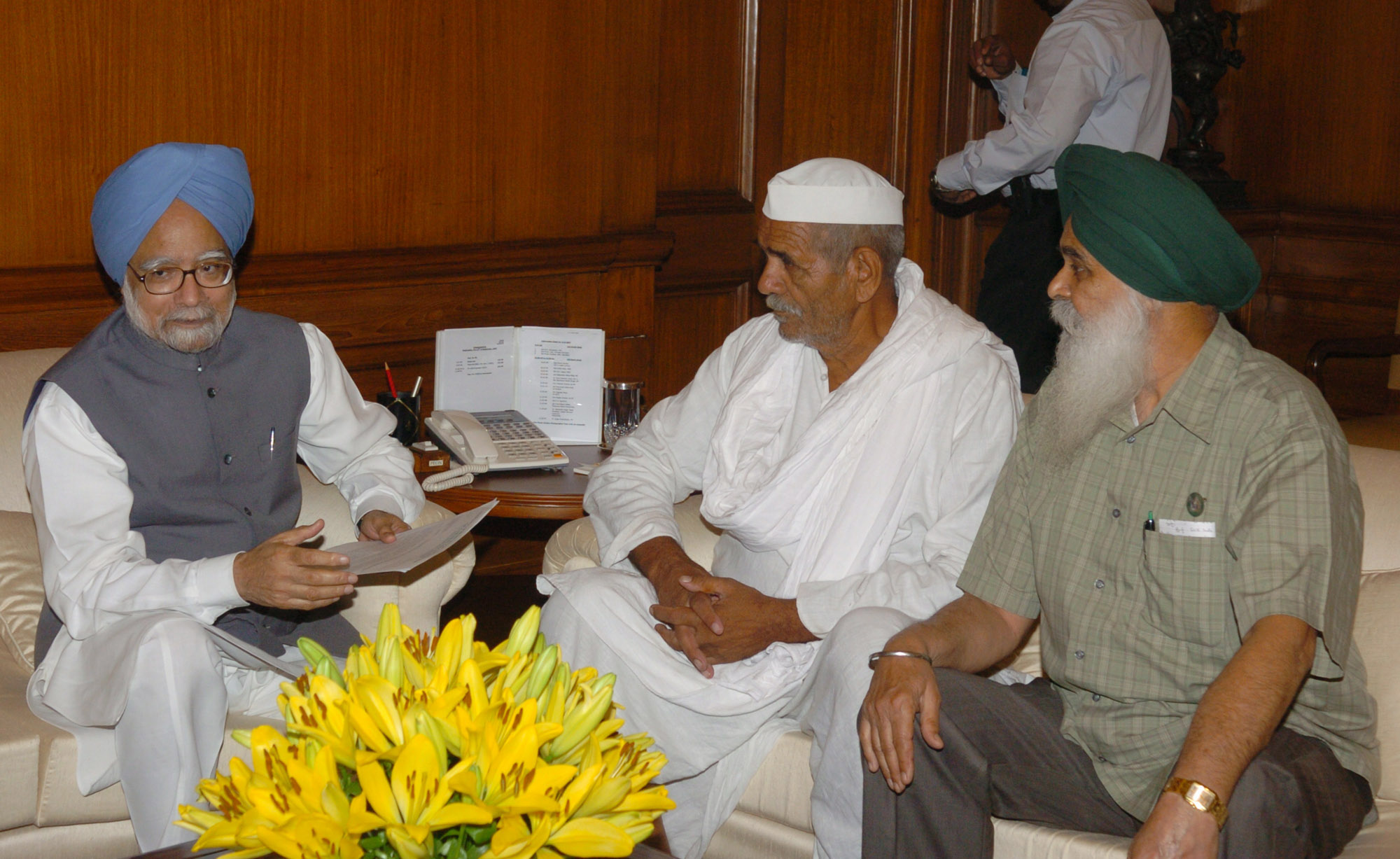
A Bhartiya Kisan Union delegation led by Shri Mahendra Singh Tikait is calling on the Prime Minister, Dr. Manmohan Singh, in New Delhi.

=== Lucknow, 1990 ===
In July 1990, Tikait protested in Lucknow with over two lakh farmers, urging the Government of Uttar Pradesh to concede to the farmers' demand for higher sugarcane prices and heavy rebates in electricity dues. The then Janata Dal-controlled government accepted the demands.

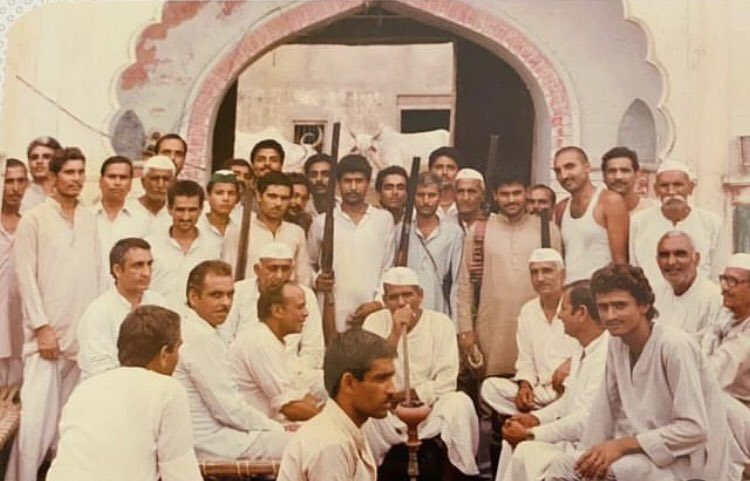
Mahendra Singh Tikait in his village, sitting with farmers

=== Lucknow, 1992 ===
In 1992, Tikait was back in Lucknow to stage a month-long sit-in panchayat in pursuance of his demand for writing off farmers' loans up to ₹10,000. The same year, he launched a Farmers Land Compensation Movement in Ghaziabad, seeking higher compensation towards the acquired land of farmers.

=== Bijnore, 2008 - Remarks against Mayawati ===
Tikait was arrested on several occasions, the last being on 2 April 2008 for allegedly making caste-based remarks against the then Uttar Pradesh Chief Minister Mayawati at a rally in Bijnore on 30 March 2008. It took a contingent of 6,000 armed policemen to lay a siege around his village for his arrest. He was released only after tendering an apology to the Chief Minister. Upon his death, Mayawati described Tikait, in a condolence message, as a "true and committed leader of farmers".

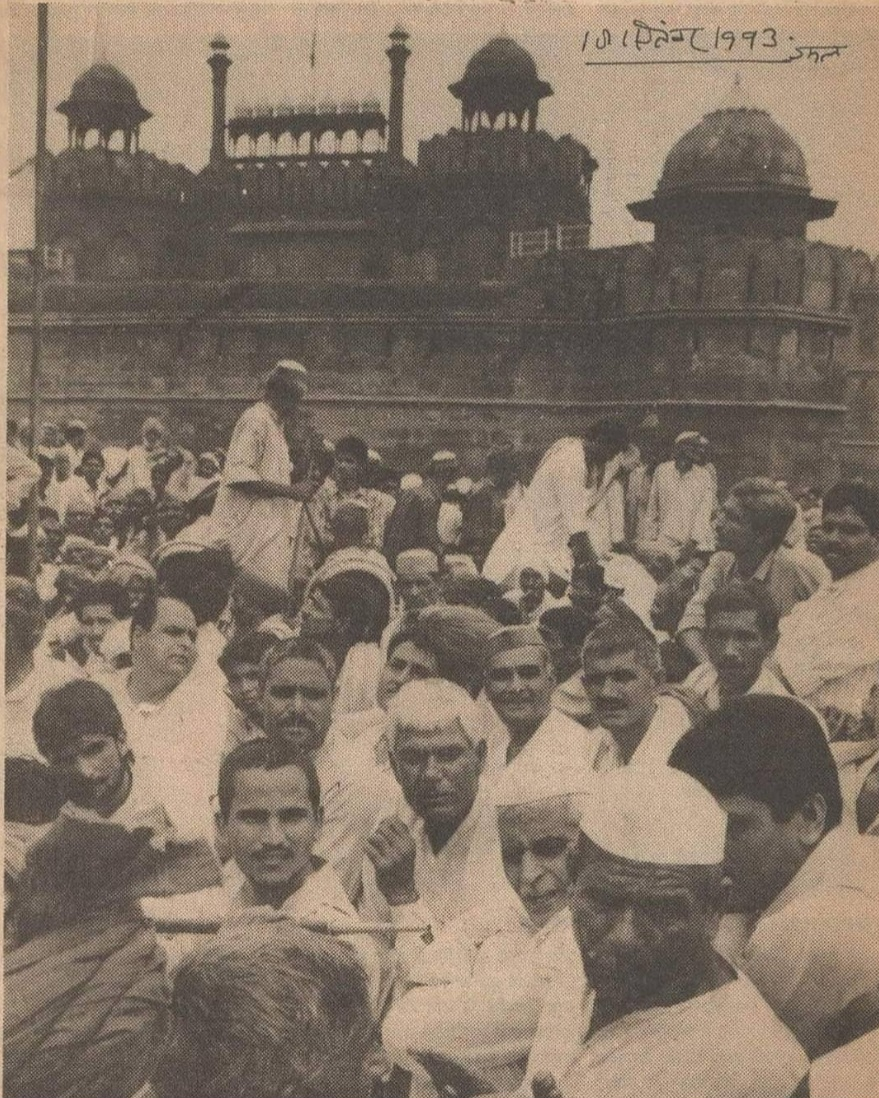
Chaudhary Mahendra Singh Tikait protesting in the Red Fort.

== Death ==
He died of bone cancer on 15 May 2011 in Muzaffarnagar, Uttar Pradesh, leaving behind a legacy continued by his sons, including Naresh and Rakesh Tikait, who remain active in the BKU.
