= Rakesh Tikait =

Farmer rights activist

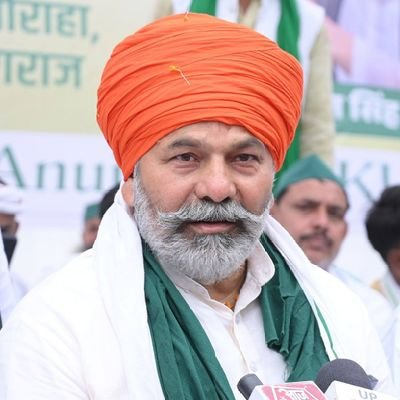
- Tikait in 2024
- Born: 4 June 1969 (age 57); Sisauli, Uttar Pradesh, India
- Education: Meerut University (MA, LLB)
- Occupation: Farmer
- Organization: Bharatiya Kisan Union
- Known for: Repelling Controversial Farm Laws (2020)
- Spouse: Sunita Devi (m. 1985)
- Children: 3
- Father: Mahendra Singh Tikait

Rakesh Tikait (born 4 June 1969) is an Indian farmer rights activist and national spokesperson of the Bharatiya Kisan Union (BKU). He successfully led the farmer protests in 2020-2021 to cause repeal of three farmer laws implemented by the Indian government.

== Personal life ==
Chaudhary Rakesh Singh Tikait was born on 4 June 1969 in Sisauli town of Muzaffarnagar, Uttar Pradesh. He is the son of a prominent farmer leader and BKU co-founder late Mahendra Singh Tikait. His eldest brother is Naresh Tikait, who is the National President of the BKU.

He upholds Gandhian ideology.

== Career ==
Tikait graduated with an M.A. degree from Meerut University and then did LLB after that. He joined Delhi Police in 1992, as constable then Sub Inspector, but left Delhi police in 1993–1994. After leaving the police, he joined the BKU. After the death of his father, Tikait officially joined BKU and later became its spokesperson. In 2018, Tikait was the leader of Kisan Kranti Yatra from Haridwar, Uttrakhand to Delhi. Tikait had contested the 2007 UP Assembly elections from the Khatauli seat as a candidate of the Bahujan Kisan Dal (BKD) party (with Congress support), only to finish a distant sixth. In the 2014 Indian general election, he fought on a Rashtriya Lok Dal ticket from Amroha Lok Sabha constituency.

== 2020-21 Farmers protest ==
In November 2020, his organization BKU joined the 2020–2021 Indian farmers' protest, demanding declaration of MSP as a legal right, exclusion of farmers from the law to curb pollution to allow burning of crops (consensus to which was reached during the sixth round of talks between the Centre and Farmer Union) and removal of the farm bills."Our biggest concern is that operations in mandis and outside would be different. While mandis would levy taxes, there would be no tax or market fee outside. The government is not abolishing the Agricultural Produce Market Committees directly. However, the mandi system enables an assured minimum support price, which will collapse gradually" said Rakesh Tikait. After violence broke out in the National Capital on 26 January (Republic Day), Delhi Police filed an FIR against Rakesh Tikait and a few other farmer leaders for their role in inciting violence on Republic Day and breach of the NOC issued by Delhi Police.

On 19 November 2021, the government took the decision to repeal the bills. Both houses of Parliament successfully passed the Farm Laws Repeal Bill, 2021 on 29 November.
