= 2020 Indian agriculture acts =

Acts of the Parliament of India

Parliament of India
- Passed: 17 September 2020 in Lok Sabha through Majority; 20 September 2020 in Rajya Sabha through Voice Vote
- Enacted: 20 September 2020
- Assented to: 27 September 2020
- Signed by: Ram Nath Kovind, President of India
- Signed: 27 September 2020
- Commenced: 27 September 2020 as a law of Republic of India, reported to public through Gazette of India.
- Repealed: 1 December 2021
- Administered by: Government of India; Ministry of Agriculture and Farmers' Welfare

Legislative history
- Introduced: 5 June 2020 (three bills)

Repeals
- Implementation stayed by Supreme Court on 12 January 2021, and formally repealed by the Government on 1 December 2021.

Summary
- The three acts had provided for the creation of an ecosystem for farmers and traders, for a national framework on farming agreements and further to amend the Essential Commodities Act, 1955
- Status: Repealed

The Indian agriculture acts of 2020, often termed the Farm Bills, were three acts initiated by the Parliament of India in September 2020. The Lok Sabha approved the bills on 17 September 2020 and the Rajya Sabha on 20 September 2020. The then President of India, Ram Nath Kovind, gave his assent on 27 September 2020.

The laws would have deregulated a system of government-run wholesale markets, allowing farmers to sell directly to food processors, but farmers feared that this would result in the end of government-guaranteed price floors, thereby reducing the prices they would receive for their crops. This inspired protests against the new acts.

On 12 January 2021, the Supreme Court stayed the implementation of the farm laws and appointed a committee to look into farmer grievances related to the farm laws. In a televised address on 19 November 2021, Narendra Modi, Prime Minister of India, announced that his government would repeal the laws in the upcoming parliamentary session in December. On 1 December 2021, the laws were formally repealed. The Supreme Court appointed committee report was made public on 21 March 2022.

== Background ==
=== Food Security and Condition of Farmers ===
India is self-sufficient in the production of various types of food. Despite this, nutrition and hunger are endemic issues in the country despite the large-scale nation-wide welfare schemes in the area. Farmer suicides, and farmer incomes are also serious challenges that have remained unresolved for decades.

Almost 50% of India's 1.3 billion people rely on agriculture to make a living, though agriculture accounts for less than 20% of India's GDP.

=== Agriculture in the State, Union and Concurrent Lists ===
The Constitution of India, Article 246, has three lists; the state list mentions "agriculture" 6 times, the union list 4 times, and the concurrent list 2 times.

=== Election Manifesto Promise ===
Both the Bharatiya Janata Party and Indian National Congress have had farm reforms as manifesto promises for years.

=== The Farm Acts ===
In 2017, the state government released a number of model farming acts. The Standing Committee on Agriculture (2018–19), however, noted that several reforms suggested in the model acts had not been implemented by the states. In particular, the Committee found that the laws that regulated Indian agricultural markets (such as those related to agricultural produce market committees or APMCs) were not being implemented fairly and honestly or serving their purpose. Centralization was thought to be reducing competition and (accordingly) participation, with undue commissions, market fees, and monopoly of associations damaging the agricultural sector.

A committee consisting of seven Chief Ministers was set up in July 2019 to discuss implementation. The committee is yet to submit its report. The centre promulgated three ordinances in the first week of June 2020.

== The Farm Acts ==
1. Farmers' Produce Trade and Commerce (Promotion and Facilitation) Act, 2020
  - expands the scope of trade areas of farmers' produce from select areas to "any place of production, collection, aggregation".
  - allows electronic trading and e-commerce of scheduled farmers' produce.
  - prohibits state governments from levying any market fee, cess, or levy on farmers, traders, and electronic trading platforms for the trade of farmers' produce conducted in an 'outside trade area'.
2. Farmers (Empowerment and Protection) Agreement on Price Assurance and Farm Services Act, 2020
  - provides a legal framework for farmers to enter into pre-arranged contracts with buyers including mention of pricing.
  - defines a dispute resolution mechanism.
3. Essential Commodities (Amendment) Act, 2020
  - removes foodstuff such as cereals, pulses, potato, onions, edible oilseeds, and oils, from the list of essential commodities, removing stockholding limits on agricultural items produced by Horticulture techniques except under "extraordinary circumstances"
  - requires that imposition of any stock limit on agricultural produce only occur if there is a steep price rise.

=== Court Stay ===
On 12 January 2021 the Supreme Court stayed the implementation of the farm laws. The Supreme Court appointed a committee to look into the grievances related to the farm laws. The committee asked the public for suggestions related to the farm laws by 20 February 2021.

== Counter legislation ==
The Punjab, Rajasthan and Chhattisgarh state assemblies tabled bills to counter and amend the Central government's three farm laws.

Counter legislation
State	Party	Counter Amendment/Law	Tabled on	Governor's Assent	Ref
Punjab	INC	The Farmers' (Empowerment and Protection) Agreement on Price Assurance and Farm Services (Special Provisions and Punjab Amendment) Bill, 2020	20 Oct 2020	No	
Punjab	INC	The Farmers' Produce Trade and Commerce (Promotion and Facilitation) (Special Provisions and Punjab Amendment) Bill, 2020	20 Oct 2020	No	
Punjab	INC	The Essential Commodities (Special Provisions and Punjab Amendment) Bill, 2020	20 Oct 2020	No	
Punjab	INC	The Code of Civil Procedure (Punjab Amendment) Bill, 2020	20 Oct 2020	No	
Rajasthan	INC	The Farmers Produce Trade and Commerce (Promotion and Facilitation) (Rajasthan Amendment) Bill, 2020	31 Oct 2020	No	
Rajasthan	INC	The Farmers (Empowerment and Protection) Agreement on Price Assurance and Farm Services (Rajasthan Amendment) Bill, 2020	31 Oct 2020	No	
Rajasthan	INC	The Essential Commodities (Special Provisions and Rajasthan Amendment) Bill, 2020	31 Oct 2020	No	
Chhattisgarh	INC	Chhattisgarh Krishi Upaj Mandi (Amendment) Bill 2020	27 Oct 2020	No	

== Reactions ==
=== Government Response ===
On 20 September 2020, Prime Minister Narendra Modi referred to the bills as a watershed moment in the history of Indian agriculture and stated the bills will "ensure a complete transformation of the agriculture sector" and empower tens of millions of farmers. In the Prime Minister's Mann ki Baat radio address on 29 November 2020, he said that "all political parties had been making promises to the farmers but now these promises had been fulfilled."

Several Union Ministers urged farmers not to have misconceptions about the reforms. Rejecting demands for the inclusion of Minimum Support Price (MSP) as a mandatory provision in the Farm Bills, Narendra Singh Tomar, the Minister of Agriculture & Farmers' Welfare said that, while the government was committed to MSP, it was "not a part of the law" earlier and "is not" today.

Modi announced on 19 November 2021 that his government will repeal the three bills once the new session of Parliament started later that month. "I urge the protesting farmers to return home to their families, and let's start afresh." Modi stated in a televised address.

=== Independent Analysts ===
==== Support ====
Gita Gopinath, the Chief Economist of International Monetary Fund, said the "farm bills and labour bills are very important steps in the right direction". She also stressed that the implementation of these laws must be right. Sociologist Salvatore Babones supported the farm laws and said that the reforms would transform Indian agriculture from a "locally managed rural economy into a modern national industry" In January 2021, 866 academics from several educational institutes signed an open letter, expressing their support for the three farm laws. The signatories were from "DU, JNU, Gorakhpur University, Rajasthan University, Gujarat University and others". In February 2021, the US State Department expressed support for the laws stating that they would improve market efficiency and private investment, while encouraging dialogue between the government and those who oppose the laws.

==== Opposition ====
Kaushik Basu, former chief economist of the World Bank called the new farm bills are "flawed" and "detrimental to farmers". In February 2021, 413 academics from across India and several foreign universities said in a statement that the new farm bills pose a major threat to Indian farming communities and urged the government to abandon it. The signatories to the statement were from Jawaharlal Nehru University, IIT Kanpur, IIT Madras, IISc Bangalore, Indian Statistical Institute Kolkata, Delhi University, Panjab University, IIT Bombay, IIM Calcutta, London Film School, University of Johannesburg, University of Oslo, University of Massachusetts, University of Pittsburgh and others.

=== Response from Farmers and Opposition Parties ===
==== Support ====
The Shetkari Sanghatana, a farmers union in Maharashtra, supported the bills and wanted the market to decide the prices of agricultural commodities. It argued that the minimum support prices have actually weakened farmers, instead of empowering them. According to a Supreme Court appointed committee, 85.7 per cent of the farmer organisations representing around 3.3-crore farmers supported the laws.

==== Opposition ====
On 31 December 2020, the Kerala legislative assembly passed a resolution against the farm reforms seeking their withdrawal. It was the fifth state to do so after Punjab, Chhattisgarh and Rajasthan and Delhi. The West Bengal assembly became the sixth state on 28 January 2021. The Punjab assembly passed another resolution against the central farm laws in the beginning of March 2021. Various opposition parties alleged that the bills were passed "unconstitutionally" in "complete disregard" of parliamentary norms and are anti-farmer and corporate-friendly. The Bharatiya Kisan Sangh (BKS), a farmers organization that is associated with the BJP itself, has demanded that the government send the bills to the Parliamentary Standing Committee on Agriculture and questioned the government's haste to get the bills passed.

The acts have faced protests from farmers in various parts of India alleging that it will hurt their earnings. The main reasons for opposition is the uncertainty regarding the implementation of the reforms, controversy surrounding the minimum support prices (MSPs) and low bargaining power of the farmers are some of the fears that have led to the opposition to the bills. Lack of statutory support in the bills for the MSP is a major point of concern, especially for farmers from Punjab and Haryana, where 65% of wheat (2019) is procured at MSP by the Food Corporation of India and state agencies. The protesters pointed out that the deregulation of the sugar industry in 1998, which paved the way for private establishments, did not result in a significant improvement in farmers' productivity or incomes. A state-led attempt in Bihar to deregulate the APMCs in 2006 has not resulted in an increase in farmers' income or improved infrastructure.

=== Protests ===
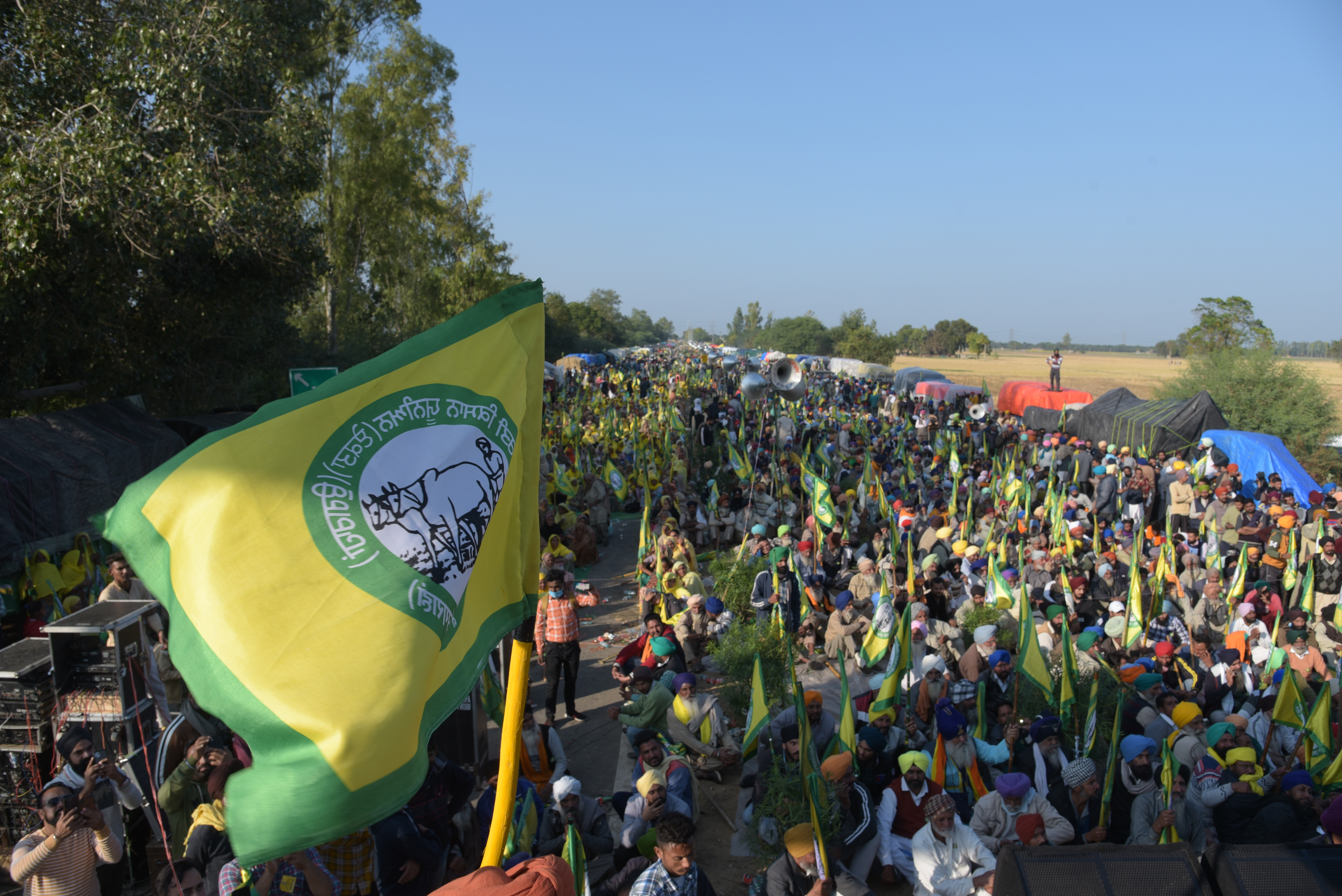
March to Delhi

Several farmers' outfits announced an intensified agitation against the acts and called for a "Bharat bandh" on 25 September 2020. This was supported by as many as 10 central trade unions and 18 political parties. Since the proposal of these laws, different protests have been held in different states of India. These protests are the first large-scale farmer protests since the Narendra Modi government came into power in 2014. On 26 November 2020, farmers from Haryana were stopped from entering Delhi by Haryana police. At the border near Ambala, protesters were struck with water cannons and tear gas shells by the police forces; protestors threw stones and tossed police barricades into the river. In response, the police used water cannons. Media have reported that trenches were dug by the police on certain routes into Delhi; the Haryana government dug the National Highway connecting Haryana and Delhi. Sand-filled trucks and bulldozers were also placed on the path of the march to Delhi. Earlier, the house of Haryana's Chief Minister was blocked by farmers.

Farmer leader and Bharatiya Kisan Union chief Rakesh Tikait were the biggest faces of the ongoing movement against agricultural laws. An attempt was made to take administrative action on the farmers agitating under the leadership of Rakesh Tikait on the Ghazipur border of Delhi, but Rakesh Tikait did not budge with his intentions and during this time pictures and videos of 'tears' in his eyes appeared in the media. And it gave a new 'edge' to this movement of farmers.

== Repeal ==
On the occasion of Gurupurab on 19 November 2021, Narendra Modi, Prime Minister of India, announced that his government would repeal the three acts during the upcoming winter session of Parliament in December. In a televised address, Modi lamented his government's inability to convince farmers of the law's advantages, saying:

...despite several attempts to explain the benefits to the farmers, we have failed. On the occasion of Guru Purab, the government has decided to repeal the three farm laws.

Experts and poll watchers suggested that the forthcoming state elections in Punjab and Uttar Pradesh in 2022 had an effect on Modi's decision. On 29 November 2021, the Indian parliament passed the bill to repeal farm laws in the country. The bill was passed without a debate in both the lower house i.e. Lok Sabha and the upper house i.e. Rajya Sabha, despite several demands of it. The farm laws repeal bill was passed within four minutes of being tabled in the Lok Sabha. It was tabled at 12:06 pm and passed by 12:10 pm, while the opposition demanded a discussion.

=== Other demands and protest withdrawal ===
The national spokesperson of the Bharatiya Kisan Union, Rakesh Tikait, stated the protests would only cease once the laws were repealed, and if a Minimum Support Price guarantee law is passed through the Parliament, by the will of the government and also to form a committee for the purpose of direct communication for other farm interests of farmers with the Government of India and the Ministry of Agriculture and Farmers' Welfare.

== See also ==
- National Food Security Act, 2013
- Public distribution system
