= Bharatiya Kisan Union =

Farmer's Representative Organisation In India

- Abbreviation: BKU
- Predecessor: Punjab Khetibari Union; Kisan Sangarsh Samiti (Haryana); Raytu Sangha (Karnataka); Vyavasayigal Sangham (Tamil Nadu)
- Formation: 1 July 1987 (39 years ago)
- Founders: Chaudhary Charan Singh; M. D. Nanjundaswamy; Narayanaswamy Naidu; Partap Singh Kadian; Bhupinder Singh Mann; Mahendra Singh Tikait
- Legal status: Active
- Headquarters: Kisan Bhawan, Sisauli, Muzaffarnagar, Uttar Pradesh
- Region served: India
- General Secretary: Yudhvir Singh
- National president: Naresh Tikait
- National spokesperson: Rakesh Tikait
- Affiliations: All India Kisan Sangharsh Coordination Committee; Via Campesina
- Website: Official Website

Bharatiya Kisan Union (BKU) (English: Indian Farmers' Union) is a farmer's representative organisation in India. It was founded by Chaudhary Charan Singh from the Punjab Khetibari Union (Punjab Farming Union) which became its Punjab branch. The union is affiliated to the All India Kisan Sangharsh Coordination Committee and Via Campesina. The national headquarters of the union is located in Sisauli, Muzaffarnagar, Uttar Pradesh.

== History ==
The foundation of the Bharatiya Kisan Union (BKU) began with the formation of the Punjab Khetibari Zamindari Union (later renamed Punjab Khetibari Union) in May 1972 with the merger of 11 peasants group in Chandigarh. In 1978, the PKU was transformed into the BKU with the intention of creating a national forum for farmers with association to the Bharatiya Lok Dal of the Janata Party (Secular), but it failed to provide a substantial mobilization of farmers initially. On 12 December 1980, an "All-India Kisan Sammelan" was organised which saw the unification of the Kisan Sangarsh Samiti (Haryana), Raytu Sangha (Karnataka) and Vyavasayigal Sangham (Tamil Nadu) under the ambit of the BKU. In 1982, the union underwent a brief split under the designation of BKU (N) led by Narayanasamy Naidu and BKU (M) led by Bhupendra Singh Mann. The organisation was however reunited by the intervention of Sharad Anantrao Joshi under a federal structure with autonomous state units. It was reorganised on 17 October 1986 by Mahendra Singh Tikait with its headquarters in Sisauli in western Uttar Pradesh as a non-partisan organisation contrary to its previous association with the former Prime Minister, Charan Singh.

During the 1980s, it emerged through a number of agitations which began with the rising wave of people's movements since the Bihar Movement following Indira Gandhi's Emergency. The Bharatiya Kisan Union attained popularity by leading the "Meerut siege" in January–February 1988 which was a 25-day long dharna (picketing) around the commissioner's office in Meerut that witnessed the gathering of hundreds of thousands of farmers from around the area into the city. Later, in the same year, the BKU under the leadership of Sharad anantrao joshi lead the "Boat Club Rally" which witnessed a mass gathering of 800,000 farmers from western Uttar Pradesh and other parts of the country into the boat club lawns of the upscale neighborhood between Udyog Bhavan and Krishi Bhavan in New Delhi. The crowd of protesting farmers who arrived with tractors and bullock carts stretched for 3 km from India Gate to Vijay Chowk. Their demands were that of the implementation of measures such as control over prices of sugarcane, loan waivers to farmers and lowering of water and power tariffs during the early stages of the process of economic liberalisation in India. The BKU achieved relative success in acquiring several concessions during this time period. The western Uttar Pradesh branch of the union was founded on 17 October 1986 by Mahendra Singh Tikait. It has 31 unions.

== Ideology ==
The Bharatiya Kisan Union (BKU) maintains itself as a non-partisan farmers' representative organisation. The stated purpose of the Union is to act as a pressure group from outside the establishment of electoral politics. The union terms the World Trade Organization (WTO) as an "unreasonable regime" which serves the interests of corporations and facilitates uneven competition by victimizing Indian farmers and the farmers of other developing countries. The BKU maintains the position that agriculture should be excluded from the ambit of the WTO, patents on products abolished and patents on process to last for only 10 years. The union has also shown skepticism towards the introduction of genetically modified crops and raises concerns that it could jeopardize sustainability and consumer health. It provides issue-based support to candidates across party lines. The union however has come into conflict with the Hindu nationalist movement which it asserts creates division on sectarian lines and is of no consequence to the farmers' movement.

== Organisation ==
The Bharatiya Kisan Union has an overarching federal structure with autonomous state units. The state units operate under their own designation in Karnataka as the Karnataka Rajya Raitha Sangha and in Tamil Nadu as the Vyavasayigal Sangham which are interpreted as regional equivalent designations of the Bharatiya Kisan Union.

The organisation of the union is modeled on the lines of a grassroots system of village panchayats. The BKU meetings are noted to be informal, rustic and egalitarian in their structure while making use of the traditional institutions of khap panchayats. It has presence in the states of Uttar Pradesh, Haryana, Punjab, Uttarakhand, Himachal Pradesh, Gujarat, Madhya Pradesh, Chhattisgarh, Rajasthan, Karnataka, Tamil Nadu and Maharashtra.

=== Leaders ===
- Rattan Singh Mann in Haryana.
- Mahendra Singh Tikait Mukti Desai, Shan Sinha, Rai Chandra as a co-worker for the party.

== See also ==
- Bharatiya Kisan Union Arajnaitik
- Sahajanand Saraswati
- Narmada Bachao Andolan
- All India Kisan Sabha
- Biopiracy
