= Farmers' protest =

A farmers' protest is a protest carried out by farmers.

Individual protests include:

- 1989–1990 Dutch farmers' protests, protests in 1989–1990 by farmers in the Netherlands
- 2008 Argentine agrarian strike, conflict in 2008 between the government and agrarians in Argentina
- 2017 Tamil Nadu farmers' protest, protests in 2017 against BJP policies in Tamil Nadu, India
- 2018 Peruvian agrarian strike, conflict in 2018 between the government and agrarians in Peru
- 2020–2021 Indian farmers' protest, mass protest in 2020–2021 by farmers in India
  - 2021 Indian farmers' Republic Day protest, protest on 2021 Republic Day by farmers in Delhi, India
- 2020–2021 Peruvian agrarian strike, conflict in 2020–2021 between the government and agrarians in Peru
- 2023–2024 European Union farmers' protests
  - Dutch farmers' protests, ongoing protests since 2019 by farmers in the Netherlands
  - 2023–2025 Czech Union farmers' protests, protests in 2023–2025 by farmers in Czechia
  - 2023–2024 German farmers' protests, protests in 2023–2024 by farmers in Germany
  - 2020s French farmers' protests, protests in the 2020s by farmers in France
  - 2024 Polish farmers' protests, protests in early 2024 by farmers in Poland
- 2024–2025 Indian farmers' protest, protest in 2024–2025 by farmers in India
- 2024–2026 United Kingdom farmers' protests, protests in 2024–2026 by farmers in the United Kingdom

== See also ==
- Farmers' Rebellion
