= Crisis situations and unrest in Europe since 2000 =

This is a list of crises situations and major protests in countries of Europe since the year 2000.

== 2026 ==
- Middle Eastern crisis (2023–present)
  - 2026 Iran war
    - Economic impact of the 2026 Iran war
  - Demonstrations and riots against Migration
    - 2026 Southampton riots
    - 2026 Northern Ireland riots
  - Demonstrations and riots against Islamophobia
    - 2026 Brussels riots
- Russian invasion of Ukraine
  - 2026 Ukrainian drone incursions into the Baltic states
- 2026 Paris Saint-Germain celebration riots

== 2025 ==
- Middle Eastern crisis (2023–present)
  - Arrest of Ekrem İmamoğlu
  - 2025–2026 Turkish protests

== 2024 ==
- Middle Eastern crisis (2023–present)
  - Demonstrations and riots against migration
    - 2024 Harehills riot (United Kingdom)
    - 2024 United Kingdom riots
  - November 2024 United Kingdom security incidents (anti-terror squads were called out to all three incidents which are now under investigation)
    - Glasgow
    - Gatwick
    - London
    - Chester
- German economic crisis (2022–present)
- 2023–2024 European Union farmers' protests (ongoing).
  - Dutch farmers' protests
  - 2023–2025 Czech Union farmers' protests
  - 2023–2024 German farmers' protests
  - 2020s French farmers' protests
  - 2024 Polish farmers' protests
- 2024–2026 United Kingdom farmers' protests
- 2024 Serbian environmental protests
- 2024–2026 Serbian anti-corruption protests

== 2023 ==
- Middle Eastern crisis (2023–present)
  - Demonstrations and riots against migration
    - 2023 Dublin riot
- 2022–2024 German economic crisis
- 2023–2024 German farmers' protests
- Protest in Brussels for better wages and service from late 2023.

== 2022 ==
- Russian full-scale invasion of Ukraine starting from February 24, 2022.
- 2022 energy crises in Europe
- 2022 Oslo shooting
- 2022–2024 German economic crisis
- 2022 Leicester riots (Hindu vs Muslim tension)

== 2021 ==
- 2021 Dutch curfew riots
- Protest and strikes of the CGT union 2021
- 2021 Russian protests
- 2021 Montenegrin episcopal enthronement protests
- 2021 North Kosovo crisis
- 2021 Abkhazia unrest
- 2021–2022 Belarus–European Union border crisis

== 2020 ==
- COVID-19 pandemic in Europe
- 2020–2021 Bulgarian protests
- 2020–2021 Belarusian protests
- 2020–2022 Serbian protests

== 2019 ==
- Dutch farmers' protests, ongoing protests since 2019 by farmers in the Netherlands
- 2019 Moscow protests
- 2019–2020 Maltese protests
- 2019 Catalan protests
- Sardines movement

== 2018 ==
- 2018–2023 UK higher education strikes
- 2018 Slovak anti-government protests after murder of journalist Ján Kuciak
- Yellow Vests movement
- 2018–2020 Serbian protests ("One of Five Million" movement)

== 2017 ==
- 2017–2018 Spanish constitutional crisis
- 2017–2019 Romanian protests
- 2017 Serbian protests
- 2017–2018 Russian protests
- 2017 Belarusian protests

== 2015 ==
- European migrant crisis (around 2014–2016)
- November 2015 Paris attacks

== 2014 ==
- 2014 Ukrainian revolution, 2014 pro-Russian unrest in Ukraine and the subsequent ongoing War in Eastern Ukraine
- 2014 unrest in Bosnia and Herzegovina (4–10 February 2014)

== 2013 ==
- Euromaidan, a wave of demonstrations and civil unrest in Ukraine
- Romanian protests against the Roșia Montană Project
- 2013 Stockholm riots (May 19–28)
- Bulgarian anti-monopoly protests and demonstrations against the Oresharski cabinet

== 2012 ==
- Greek labour unions continue strikes.
- Violent protests in Romania in January
- Ongoing protest activity in Russia
- Slovenian protests in Slovenia (2012-2013)

== 2011 ==
- 2011 Northern Ireland riots (20 June–16 July)
- 2011 United Kingdom public sector strikes (30 November), 2 million public sector workers strike over pensions
- 2011 England riots (6–11 August), thousands of people of the lower socio-economic group riot
- North Kosovo crisis (July–December), involving ethnic Serb demonstrators in North Kosovo against Republic of Kosovo Police and KFOR
- 2011 Rome demonstration (15 October)
- 2011 Germany E. coli O104:H4 outbreak (May–June)
- Thousands of protesters hold demonstrations in Belgrade, Serbia against the arrest of Ratko Mladić (26 May).
- 2011 Portuguese anti-austerity movement (12 March)
- Nationwide protests across Spain (May–)
- Anti-cuts protest in London (26 March)
- Refugees of the 2011 Libyan civil war (2011–2013)
- Nationwide protests and strikes in Greece continue throughout 2011.
- Domodedovo International Airport bombing (24 January)
- Major Russian protests begin in response to the 2011 Russian legislative election.
- 2011 Norway attacks (22 July)

== 2010 ==
- Spanish air traffic controllers' strike on December
- European debt crisis
- Suicide bombing in Stockholm on 11 December, the first ever suicide attack in the Nordic countries
- Student protests across the United Kingdom since November
- Student protest in Dublin on 3 November
- Pension reform strikes across France during September and October (still ongoing)
- Pride March is held in Belgrade, Serbia and Serbian protestors (mainly Obraz) clash with the riot police to try to disrupt the parade
- Ajka alumina plant accident in Ajka, Hungary, on 4 October
- French Romani repatriation in July
- Nationwide protests across Greece in May
- Air travel disruption after the 2010 Eyjafjallajökull eruption in April and May
- Metro suicide bombings in Moscow on 29 March

== 2009 ==
- Swine flu pandemic
- Protests at the G-20 summit in London in April
- Riot in Riga, Latvia, on 13 January
- Riots involving Bosnian football clubs NK Široki Brijeg and FK Sarajevo
- Anti-Israel riots in Oslo in January, continuing from December 2008
- Protests in Iceland in response to the country's financial crisis
- Unibrennt student protests in Austria
- Protest and riot in Vilnius, Lithuania, on 16 January

== 2008 ==
- Energy crisis in Bulgaria
- Riots in Greece in December
- Presidential election protests in Armenia
- Protests in Belgrade, Serbia following the declaration of Kosovo's independence
- Karadžić arrest sparks riots in Belgrade, Serbia.
- Rioting in Manchester before, during and after the 2008 UEFA Cup final
- Armed conflict between Georgia on one side and Russia, South Ossetia and Abkhazia on the other
- 2008 unrest in Kosovo

== 2007 ==
- Riots beginning 26 November in Val-d'Oise, France, following the deaths of two teenagers in a traffic collision with a police vehicle
- Anti-government protests in Georgia
- Global spread of H5N1
- Dissenters' March in St. Petersburg and Moscow beginning 24 November
- Football riot in Catania, Italy, in which one police officer was killed
- Bronze Night riots in Tallinn in April
- Attempted car bombings in London on 29 June
- Attempted suicide attack on Glasgow Airport on 30 June, Scotland's first ever terrorist attack
- Eviction and demolition of Ungdomshuset in Nørrebro of Copenhagen, March 2007

== 2006 ==
- Youth protests across France from February to April
- Riots in Dublin on 25 February
- Anti-government protests across Hungary from 17 September to 23 October
- Immigrant youth riots in Brussels following the unexplained death of a Moroccan local in police custody
- December Riot in Copenhagen

== 2005 ==
- Riots derived from racial tensions in Birmingham, England, on 22 and 23 October
- Civil unrest by suburban youth across France
- Suicide bombings on 7 July and attempted bombings on 21 July in London

== 2004 ==
- Commuter train bombings in Madrid on 11 March
- Metro suicide bombing in Moscow on 6 February
- Violent unrest in Kosovo in March
- Orange Revolution in Ukraine beginning in November
- Beslan school siege in North Ossetia

== 2003 ==
- Rose Revolution in Georgia in November
- Truck bomb attacks in Istanbul on 15 and 20 November

== 2002 ==
- Moscow theater hostage crisis from 23 to 26 October

== 2001 ==
- Gothenburg riots during European Council and EU-US summit from 14 to 16 June
- 2001 Oldham riots
- 2001 Harehills riot
- 2001 Bradford riots
- Pride March in Belgrade, Serbia is brought to an end by Serbian protestors

== 2000 ==
- Overthrow of Slobodan Milošević in Belgrade, Serbia
- Russian submarine Kursk explosion on 12 August
- Baia Mare cyanide spill in Romania on 30 January
- Czech TV crisis beginning in late 2000 and continuing until early 2001

== See also ==
- Great Recession
- 2007–2008 world food price crisis
- 2000s energy crisis
- Effects of the 2000s energy crisis
- 2008–2010 automotive industry crisis
- Global catastrophic risk
- Causes of the Great Recession
- Great Recession in Europe
- 2010 European sovereign debt crisis timeline
- 2008 financial crisis
- Russia–Ukraine gas disputes
- Fuel protests in the United Kingdom
- 2008 European Union stimulus plan
- 2020s in European history
