= 2024–2025 Indian farmers' protest =

- Date: 13 February 2024 – Mid 2025
- Location: India
- Goals: Pension of 10,000 INR per month for every farmer above 60 years; Fixed daily wages for farming to the farmers under MGNREGA, Rs 700 a day with 200 days of guaranteed employment a year.; Government to ensure at least 50% profit over their overall cost of production.; Legal guarantee of minimum support price (MSP) for all the crops; Implement the recommendations of the MS Swaminathan committee on agriculture; Justice for Lakhimpur Kheri violence; Urge the government to fulfill its promise to double farmers' incomes, highlighting the surge in cultivation costs over recent years and the stagnation of incomes, which has rendered farming a loss-making enterprise.; Call for the withdrawal of legal cases filed against protesters during the previous agitation in 2020-21.
- Methods: Demonstration; Protest; Tractor March
- Result: Protests ended.

Parties
Government of India: Ministry of Agriculture and Farmers' Welfare	Bharatiya Kisan Union; Punjab Kisan Union

Casualties and losses
3 deaths Several security force personnel injured	5 deaths 160 protestors injured

The 2024–2025 Indian farmers' protest was the second round of continuous protests and road blockades initiated by farmers in the northern states of Punjab and Haryana on 13 February 2024, primarily located at Punjab's Shambhu border. The main demands of the protests included securing legal assurance for the Minimum Support Price (MSP) mechanism for all crops and complete loan relief or debt cancellation for all farmers.

== Background ==
In September 2020, the Parliament enacted three bills: the Farmers’ Produce Trade and Commerce (Promotion and Facilitation) Bill, 2020; the Farmers (Empowerment and Protection) Agreement on Price Assurance and Farm Services Bill, 2020; and the Essential Commodities (Amendment) Bill, 2020. The administration claims that such laws would diminish the government's involvement in agriculture and create greater opportunities for the private sector. The farmers were concerned that eliminating government protections would make them vulnerable to businesses.

In 2021, farmers protested against these laws. Over 200 farmers' organisations joined the protest. On November 19, 2021, Prime Minister Narendra Modi declared that the centre had chosen to revoke the three agriculture laws passed by Parliament in the year 2020.

The farmers protested once more, alleging that the government failed to fulfil the promises made in 2020–2021. They also blamed the government for not attempting to double their incomes. Samyukta Kisan Morcha (SKM) organised a statewide rural and industrial strike to show displeasure with the government.

== Demands ==
2024: Farmers protest demands:

1. Minimum Support Price (MSP) Guarantee:
  - The farmers demanded the enactment of a law that ensures a guaranteed minimum price for all crops. This legal assurance would protect their income and provide stability in agricultural markets.
2. Debt Waiver:
  - The implementation of the Swaminathan Commission's recommendations was sought to provide debt waivers to farmers. All debts of the farmers above Rs. 10,000 to be waived, worth ₹18.4 lakh crore.
3. Land Acquisition Compensation:
  - Farmers demanded more compensation for land acquired by various authorities for developmental projects. They also sought the reservation of 10% of residential plots on developed lands for the families affected by land acquisition.
4. Withdrawal from World Trade Organisation (WTO) Agreements:
  - Some farmers expressed concerns about the impact of international trade agreements on their livelihoods.
  - They called for India's withdrawal from the WTO and the imposition of a ban on all Free Trade Agreements (FTA).
5. Justice for Lakhimpur Kheri violence:
  - The farmers demanded punishment for the perpetrators of the Lakhimpur Kheri massacre, where several farmers lost their lives.
  - Ensuring justice for the victims and their families is a critical aspect of their protest.
6. Pension for Farmers and Farm Labourers:
  - Allocation of pensions to farmers and farm labourers.
7. Scrapping the Electricity Amendment Bill 2020:
  - Farmers feared the growing privatisation of electricity and lack trust in state governments to pay subsidies on time.
  - They called for the removal of the bill to safeguard their interests.
8. Compensation for Lives Lost During the 2020–2021 Agitation:
  - Families of farmers who died during the 2020–2021 agitation seek monetary compensation.
  - The demand also includes providing employment opportunities for one family member.
9. MGNREGA Employment:
  - The farmers advocate for 200 days of employment per year under the Mahatma Gandhi National Rural Employment Guarantee Act (MGNREGA) for farming.
  - They emphasise a daily wage of Rs 700 to support rural workers.
10. National Commission for Spices:
  - The formation of a commission specifically for different spices is requested to address the unique challenges faced by spice growers.
11. Protection of Indigenous People's Rights:
  - The farmers seek protection for land, forests, and water sources belonging to tribal communities.
  - Ensuring the rights of indigenous people is a priority.
12. Improving Seed Quality:
  - Farmers call for measures to enhance seed quality.
  - They propose penalising companies that produce fake seeds, pesticides, and fertilisers to safeguard agricultural productivity.

Financial Security:

- Guaranteed Income: Farmers above 60 years of age, are demanding a monthly pension of ₹10,000.
- Minimum Wages under MGNREGA: Protesters are seeking fixed daily wages for agricultural work under the Mahatma Gandhi National Rural Employment Guarantee Act (MGNREGA). The proposed wage is ₹700 per day with a guarantee of 200 days of work annually.
- Agro-Industry Integration Farmers seek better integration with the agro-industry to bypass intermediaries and secure direct market access. They aim to establish farmer-producer organisations, enabling collective bargaining power, fair pricing, and reduced dependency on middlemen.

Market Support:

- Legal Guarantee of Minimum Support Price (MSP) for All Crops: The central demand of the protest is a legal framework guaranteeing MSP for all agricultural produce. Currently, the government announces MSP for only a select few crops, leaving others vulnerable to market fluctuations and potentially lower prices. A legal guarantee would provide farmers with a more stable and predictable income.
- Implementation of Swaminathan Committee Recommendations: The protestors seek the implementation of the recommendations made by the M.S. Swaminathan Committee, a high-level committee formed in 2006 to address agricultural issues in India. The committee's report proposes various measures to improve farmers' income and welfare, including improved infrastructure, investment in research and development, and market reforms.
- Pensions for farmers, loan waivers, and withdrawal from the World Trade Organization.

Other Demands:

- Along with this demand, farmers also ask for the withdrawal of cases registered during the last agitation in 2020–21.
- The farmers also insist that the government ensure at least 50 percent profit over their overall cost of production.
- The farmers also want the government to honor a promise to double their incomes, complaining that costs of cultivation have jumped over the past few years while incomes have stagnated, making farming a loss-making enterprise.

== Protests ==
With tens of thousands of farmers marching towards Delhi with their thousands of tractors, the police sealed the borders and placed barricades to prevent the farmers from entering Delhi. Section 144 was imposed for a month, preventing the gathering of three or more people. At the Shambu border between Haryana and Punjab, where thousands of farmers gathered, police used tear gas and rubber bullets, while drones flew overhead to drop tear gas on the protesting crowds. Barricades were also placed at the Gazipur and Tikri borders. Internet services were suspended in seven districts of Haryana. The borders between Haryana and Delhi were also blocked. Not all the farmers that participated in the 2020 protests are part of this protest. A group of 250 farmers' unions, organized under the Kisan Mazdoor Morcha and the Samyukta Kisan Morcha (a non-political platform consisting of 150 unions) from Punjab, are leading the 2024 protest.

The march was paused as discussions were ongoing between the farmer's unions and the government ministers.

After again suspending their strike until the end of February after a young farmer died during the protests, the farmers resumed their march to the capital. The protest leaders alleged that dozens of farmers were detained during the march, forcing them to call it off. The Samyukta Kisan Morcha (Non-Political) said in a statement that farmers moving towards Delhi had been stopped by police in some states. Reportedly, fifty farmers were taken into custody in Rajasthan on March 5, while others travelling to Delhi by train were also detained. The Rajasthan police denied detaining any farmers.

As of Mid 2025 the protests have ended. Small agitation still continue but for other reasons.

== Government proposals ==
=== Centre proposes 5-year plan to farmers to buy pulses, maize at MSP ===
Following the fourth round of talks between a government panel and the farmers, the central government proposed a 5-year plan for the procurement of pulses and maize at Minimum Support Price (MSP). The MSP serves as a protective measure devised by the government to assure farmers of a guaranteed price for their harvest, shielding them from market uncertainties. Acknowledging the significance of pulses and maize in the agricultural landscape, the government's proposition seeks to extend enduring assistance by ensuring a steady income for farmers.

Under the proposal, a fixed quantity of pulses and maize will be procured at MSP over the next five years. This initiative holds paramount importance in fostering price stability, curbing the exploitation of farmers by intermediaries, and fostering agricultural sustainability. By establishing a dependable market and an equitable pricing system, the plan endeavours to motivate farmers to persist in cultivating these crops, thus bolstering the country's food security efforts.

== Gathering of farmers' organisations ==
The Samyukta Kisan Morcha, a non-political body of farmers that claims to be a platform of over 150 farmer organisations, and the Kisan Mazdoor Morcha, which is backed by another 100 farmers' unions, are leading the 'Delhi Chalo' march. The protests are led by Jagjit Singh Dallewal of BKU (Dallewal) and Sarvan Singh Pandher of Kisan Mazdoor Morcha.

== Death and injuries ==
February 2024 clashes:

- Five farmers died during the protests at the Shambhu and Khanauri borders between February 16 and 23, 2024.
- Three deaths were attributed to cardiac arrest, according to hospital records.
- The cause of death for Shubhkaran Singh, a 21-year-old protester, is undetermined. Farmers allege he died from police firing, while hospital records state he was "brought dead." No postmortem has been conducted yet.
- The other deceased include Gyan Singh (65), Manjeet Singh (72), Narendra Pal Singh (45) and Darshan Singh (62).

== Responses and reactions ==
A video containing the comments of Jagjit Singh Dallewal of BKU (Dallewal), an important leader of the protest, has generated some amount of controversy. In this video, Dallewal is shown indicating that they want to bring down Narendra Modi's graph (his popularity) that soared due to the consecration of the Ram Mandir, and that these protests offer a window of opportunity to achieve that. These remarks were criticized by Khattar, the Haryana Chief Minister. However, Pawan Khera of the Indian National Congress supported Dallewal's remarks, responding that the farmers have every right to express their political views.

== See also ==
- 2020–2021 Indian farmers' protest
- 2023–2024 European Union farmers' protests
  - Dutch farmers' protests
  - 2023–2025 Czech Union farmers' protests
  - 2023–2024 German farmers' protests
  - 2020s French farmers' protests
  - 2024 Polish farmers' protests
- 2024–2026 United Kingdom farmers' protests
- 2011 land acquisition protests in Uttar Pradesh
- 2017 Tamil Nadu farmers' protest
- 2021 Indian farmers' Republic Day protest
- 2021 Lakhimpur Kheri violence
- Agrarian distress
- Farmers' protest
