= 2024–2026 United Kingdom farmers' protests =

Protests against agricultural inheritance taxation

November 2024–present United Kingdom farmers' protests
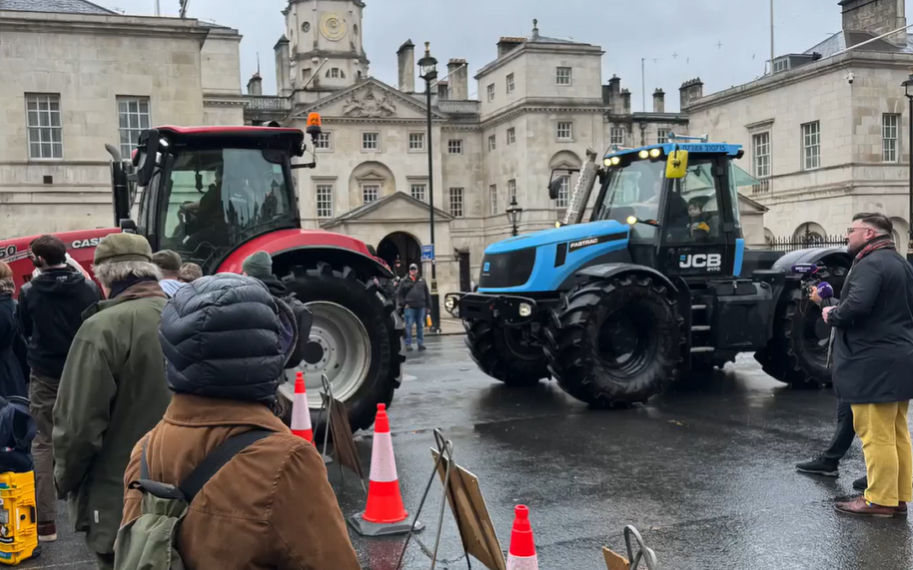
- Tractors on Whitehall in London during a farmers' protest in November 2024
- Date: 19 November 2024 – ongoing
- Location: United Kingdom
- Caused by: New inheritance tax laws on agricultural assets
- Methods: Protests, lobbying
- Status: Ongoing

Parties
National Farmers' Union of England and Wales; National Farmers' Union of Scotland	Government of the United Kingdom

Lead figures
Tom Bradshaw; Martin Kennedy; Andrew Connon	(United Kingdom) Keir Starmer; (United Kingdom) Andy Burnham; (United Kingdom) Rachel Reeves; (United Kingdom) John Healey; (United Kingdom) Steve Reed; (United Kingdom) Emma Reynolds; (United Kingdom) Angela Eagle

Mass protests organised by farmer organisations, against new inheritance tax laws on agricultural assets, have taken place around the United Kingdom since November 2024. The new laws were proposed in the October 2024 budget of the Labour government, and have led to thousands of British farmers protesting, including in Parliament Square and addressing MPs directly in parliament.

== Background ==
The protests were a response to proposed changes to inheritance tax on agricultural assets, which media outlets dubbed as a "tractor tax". Previously, the intergenerational transfer of farms had been made exempt from taxation in 1992 by the Conservative Major ministry, to protect food security.

In November 2024, the newly elected Labour Starmer ministry announced plans to remove the exemption from inheritance tax for farms valued at £1,000,000 or more to generate revenue for public services. However, various conditional allowances would allow a tax threshold as high as £3,000,000. Set to take effect in April 2026, the new policy would see a 20% inheritance tax on farm valued over that threshold, half the standard rate of inheritance tax, and could be paid interest-free across ten years.

Opposition to the change from farmers stemmed from their claim that farmers, while asset-rich, are cash-poor, which they said created a situation whereby heirs would have to sell farm land to meet tax obligations. Supporters of the change said that it would recoup money from wealthy people who had bought agricultural land as an investment to avoid inheritance tax, "robbing young farmers of the dream of owning their own farm" according to Environment Secretary Steve Reed. Organisations representing British farm owners said income declined across various agricultural sectors in the year ending February 2024, with some farms experiencing revenue drops exceeding 70%. Average annual incomes ranged from a modest £17,000 for livestock grazing operations to £143,000 for specialised poultry farms, further exacerbating the thinness of profit margins despite high land valuations.

The scale of potential impact is a point of contention. Government figures suggested the measure would affect approximately 27 percent of farms in the UK (approximately 56,700 farms), equivalent to 500 farms annually. The Country Land and Business Association (CLA) suggested that 35 percent of farms (approximately 70,000 farms) would be impacted. BBC Verify said their analysis suggests the actual numbers were likely to be closer to those from the government than the CLA's; The Telegraph disputed BBC Verify's figures.

== Protests ==
=== November ===
On 19 November, thousands of farmers gathered on Parliament Square in London to protest against the planned agricultural inheritance taxation policies. The National Farmers' Union (NFU), through its president, Tom Bradshaw, promised sustained protest activities until their concerns were adequately addressed. The organisation characterised the tax measure as having "disastrous human impacts" on farming communities. Amongst the protestors were demonstrators carrying banners and megaphones while children rode toy tractors around Parliament Square. Despite organisers' requests to avoid bringing agricultural machinery into London, a small group of real tractors proceeded past Downing Street, necessitating a Metropolitan Police response. Jeremy Clarkson addressed one group, calling the tax hikes a "hammer blow to the back of the head" of British agriculture. A BBC News journalist put to him comments Clarkson had made previously in The Times, saying he had only got into farming to avoid taxes. The General Secretary of the NFU said that more extreme actions could be taken if the Government didn't U-turn. The protest included a coordinated lobbying effort involving 1,800 farmers entering Parliament to press their case directly with Members of Parliament (MPs). NFU leaders engaged with approximately 150 MPs, warning of potential food shortages and the dissolution of family farming traditions. There were also concerns from some farmers that the change could lead to dependence on natural disaster-vulnerable foreign food imports from countries like Peru, Spain, or Portugal.

Traffic in the Channel port town of Dover was disrupted on 27 November by dozens of farmers from Kent and Sussex staging a go-slow tractor protest in the town against the tax changes. The protest was organised by the campaign group Fairness for Farmers, and was supported by the National Farmers’ Union. On the evening of same day, farmers in Wales parked 40 tractors in front of Holyhead Port on the island of Anglesey in Wales. The tractors caused disruption and delay to ferry services to and from the port until the early morning of 28 November, with lorries being held up for several hours.

On 28 November, hundreds of farmers and crofters held a rally in Edinburgh outside the Scottish Parliament Building.

Dozens of Devon farmers took part in a rally on Bigbury beach, on 30 November, to protest over the tax changes.

=== December ===
On 9 December, about 40 tractors circled around the centre of Melton Mowbray to protest against the government's "family farm tax".

On 11 December, hundreds of tractors were driven into Whitehall for a rally organised by Save British Farming, with the support of Fairness for Farmers and other farming groups. Farmers from all over the UK congregated in central London under the banner "RIP British Farming". Also on 11 December, Farmers disrupted national trunk roads, as around 75 tractors from Essex and Suffolk took part in a go-slow on the A14 near the port of Felixstowe whilst about 20 tractors did the same thing on the A5 near the Daventry International Rail Freight Terminal in Northamptonshire. On the same day, crowds gathered in Yorkshire to watch more than 100 tractors process from Murton and through the city of York, passing landmarks such as York Minster and Clifford's Tower.

=== February ===
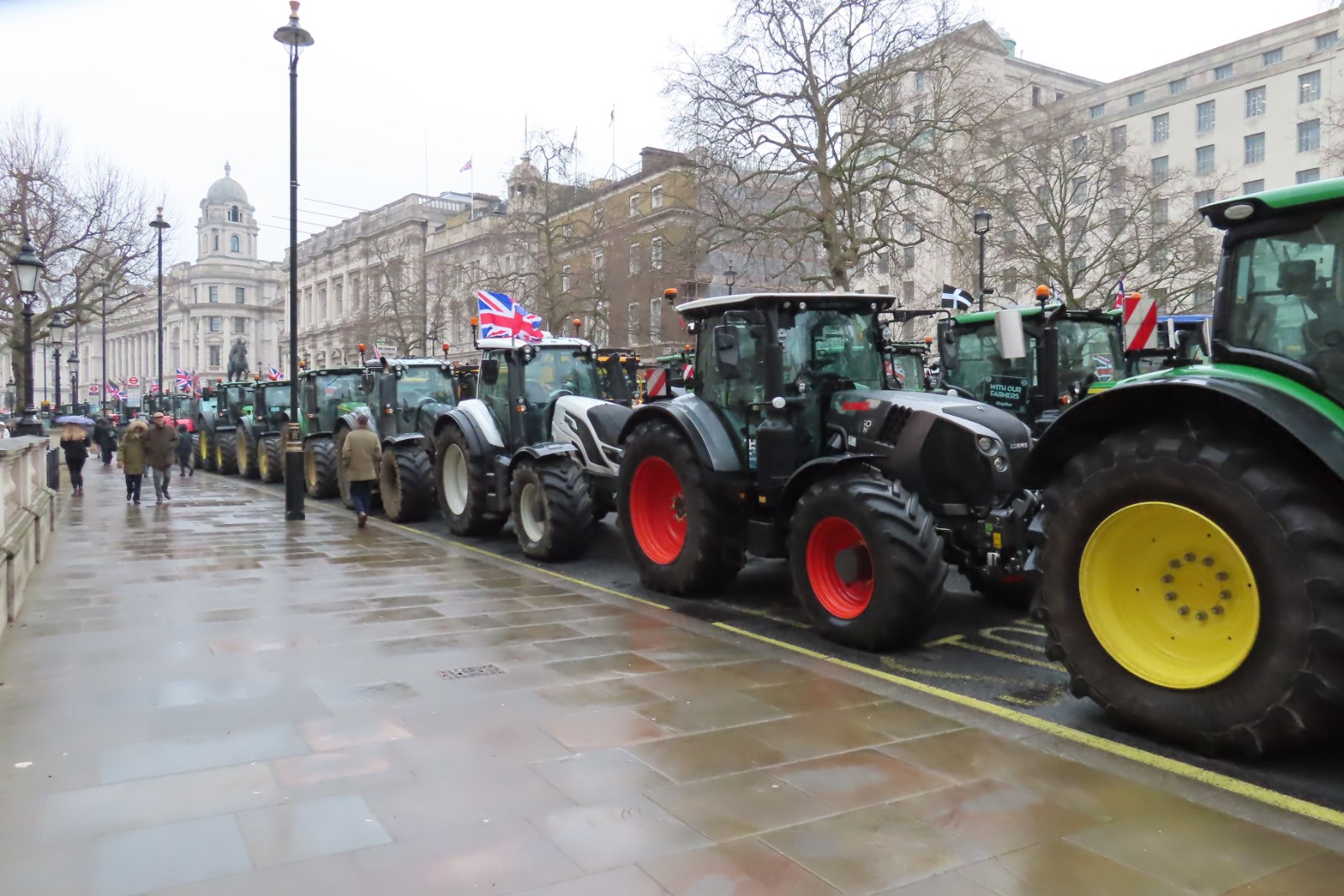
Tractors on Whitehall, London, in February 2025

On 10 February Save British Farming organised a second rally attended by over 1,000 tractors. Speakers included NFU president Tom Bradshaw and food poverty campaigner Dominic Watters.

== Responses ==
The prime minister, Keir Starmer, responded to concerns by saying that the actual threshold for inheritance tax liability could reach up to as high as £3,000,000 once various exemptions were applied, including considerations for couples and specific agricultural property relief.

The secretary of state for environment, food and rural affairs, Steve Reed defended the tax changes as a measure to counter wealthy investors using agricultural land for tax avoidance, stating it had become "the most effective way for the super rich to avoid paying their inheritance tax."

The National Farmers' Union said that more than 60% of farms could be impacted by tax implications. The organisation's deputy president, David Exwood, said that the government had "completely blown their trust with the industry."

Conservative leader Kemi Badenoch said that she would U-turn on the move if the Conservatives were elected in the next general election.

British campaigner Guy Shrubsole said that while people were debating the change in inheritance tax, that 350 aristocratic estates remained inheritance tax exempt due to being counted under the ‘tax-exempt heritage assets’ scheme. He urged the government to close this tax loophole.

== See also ==
- 2023–2024 European Union farmers' protests
- 2024 French farmers' protests
- 2024 Polish farmers' protests
- Dutch farmers' protests
- 2023–2024 German farmers' protests
- 2023–2025 Czech Union farmers' protests
