= Farmers' Rebellion =

Farmers' Rebellion or Farmers' Revolt may refer to:

- 1963 Dutch farmers' revolt
- 1971 Dutch farmers' revolt
- 1989–1990 Dutch farmers' protests
- Fries's Rebellion
- Kett's Rebellion
- Lærdal farmers' rebellion
- Peasants' Revolt
- Shays's Rebellion
- Strilekrigen
- Swing Riots

== See also ==
- Farmers' Alliance
- Farmers' movement
- Farmers' protest
- List of peasant revolts
