= 2018 Peruvian agrarian strike =

2018 Peruvian agrarian protests
- Part of the 2017–2021 Peruvian political crisis
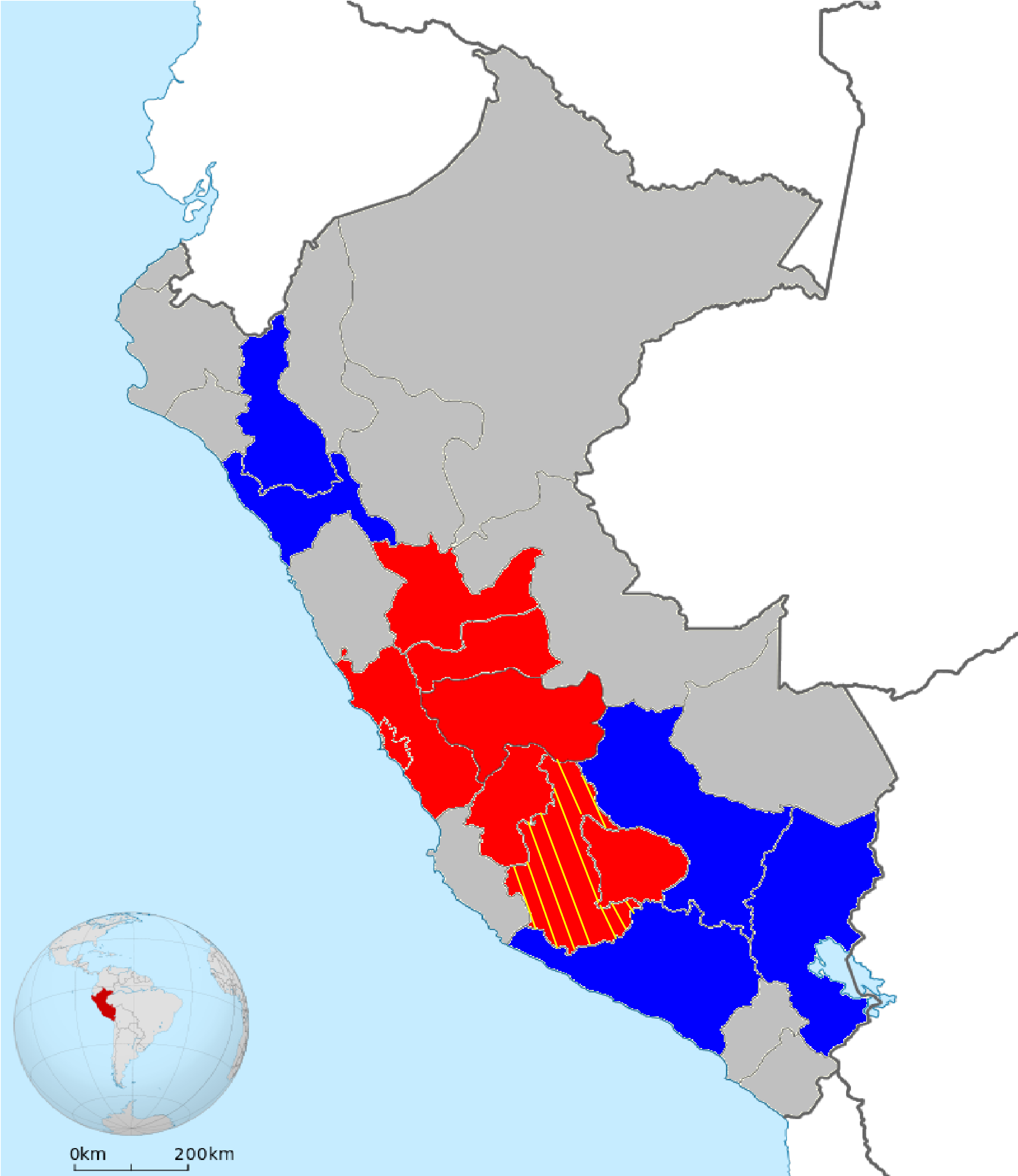
- Graphic image of the protest situation (3 February): Regions where the protests complied and/or expanded Regions where the protests ended Regions where protests were not followed Regions where they were not called and/or did not respond to the protests
- Date: 9 January – 11 February 2018
- Location: Peru
- Caused by: Possible crisis in the Peruvian agrarian sector; Excessive drop in potato price
- Methods: Demonstrations; Occupations; National strikes; Flash mobs

Casualties
- Death: Two protesters

The Peruvian agrarian strike of 2018 was a series of initially peaceful protests that took place from January 9 to February 11 in a large part of the Peruvian territory. The strike was performed by medium and small independent farmers who demanded that the government declare the agricultural sector in state of emergency due to serious deficiencies in production and trade, especially in the potato sector. On January 30, 2018 the demonstrations turned violent and expanded to departments that at first did not comply with the strike, until now the clashes between the National Police of Peru and the demonstrators left two people dead and serious material damage in the entire area.

== Background ==
Since the rise to power of Pedro Pablo Kuczynski in 2016, Peru was involved in various protests from different areas, such as the education and health sector, the reactions to the pardon to former President Alberto Fujimori at the beginning of January 2018 and, at the same time, the resurgence of the political crisis that plagues the country.

The protests germinated when the national potato price collapsed tremendously due to the low prices of the same tuber exported from abroad by free trade agreements (FTAs) signed by Peru. Farmers called for the renegotiation of the FTAs and economic reparations that are caused by the loss of sales.

== Strike ==
On January 9, the National Commission of Potato Producers announced the start of the strike with quiet protests in several cities of the Peruvian central highlands. After an agreement between farmers and the government, the demonstrations were halted. On January 25, the strikers expected the arrival of government representatives such as the President of the Council of Ministers, Mercedes Aráoz Fernández and the Minister of Agriculture and Irrigation, José Arista. On the agreed day, however, they did not arrive, and representatives of each state organization were sent in their place, and the strikers announced that, as a result, the strike would restart on January 30 but in a violent manner.

On January 30, demonstrators were blocking motorways and burning state installations in all departments, and in this case two deaths and numerous injuries were reported. On February 2 the main stage of the National Commission of Potato Producers reached an agreement with the government to lift the strike. This measure was only made official in the department of Ayacucho and some districts of other departments, this because the other Departmental proceedings are shown to be in disagreement with the ruling. Later in the same month, Ayacucho and other de facto districts would restart unemployment by a strikers majority that did not know what was agreed with the government.

On February 11 the Peruvian government managed to reach an agreement to buy the products exceeded the strikers, both the dissidents and the National Commission of Potato Producers lifted the strike.

== See also ==
- Irrigation in Peru
- List of protests in the 21st century
