= 2023–2024 European Union farmers' protests =

2023–2024 protests by farmers in the European Union due to climate policies

- Dutch farmers' protests; 2023–2025 Czech Union farmers' protests; 2023–2024 German farmers' protests; 2020s French farmers' protests; 2024 Polish farmers' protests
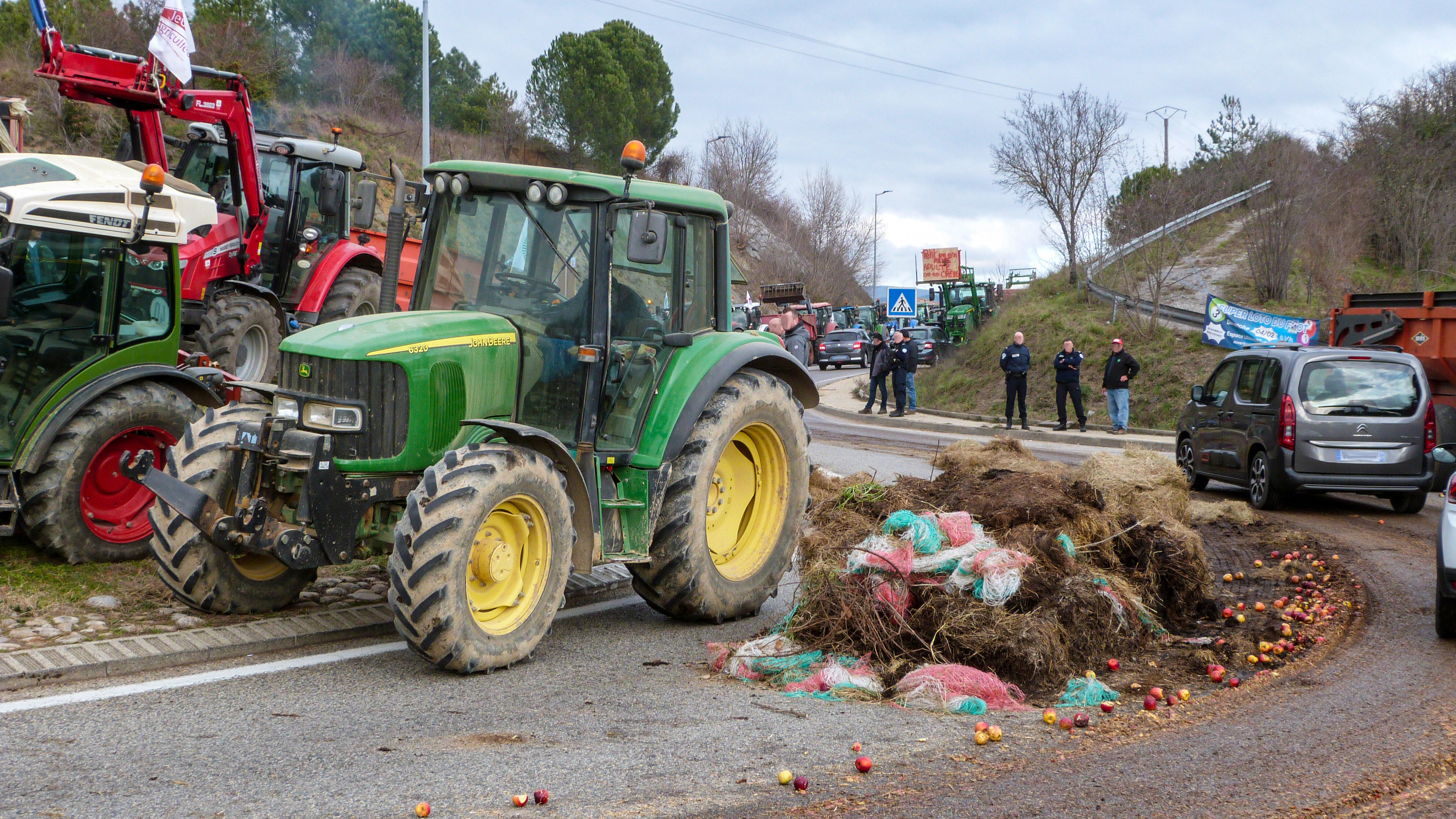
- Tractors at Saint-Etienne-de-Fontbellon (Ardèche, Auvergne-Rhône-Alpes) during the French farmers' protests in January 2024
- Date: December 2023 – June 2024
- Location: European Union
- Caused by: Proposals to limit the human impact on the nitrogen cycle; The cutting of diesel fuel subsidies, especially in Germany; Importation of non-EU, particularly Ukrainian and South American, agricultural produce
- Goals: Increased agricultural subsidies; Limitation of foreign agricultural produce imports; Higher prices for agricultural produce
- Methods: Protests; Street blockades; Free tolls

Casualties
- Deaths: 2
- Injuries: 3
- Arrested: at least 91

The 2024 European farmers' protests were a series of protests by farmers that occurred from December 2023 to June 2024. The farmers have protested against low food prices, proposed environmental regulations (such as a carbon tax, pesticide bans, nitrogen emissions curbs and restrictions on water and land usage), and trade in agricultural products with non-European Union member states, such as Ukraine and the Mercosur bloc of South America. The protests take place in a context of the Common Agricultural Policy, a program where the EU provides €57 billion in subsidies to farmers (approximately a quarter of all EU subsidies).

Under the European Green Deal, which aimed at making the European bloc carbon-neutral by 2050, farmers would need to devote 4% of their arable land to non-productive purposes and reduce the use of fertilizer by 20%. In response to the protests, the EU backtracked on policies to consider farming emissions in its 2040 climate roadmap, a law to cut pesticide use and delaying implementation of a target for farmers to leave some land fallow to improve biodiversity. In France and Germany, farmers protested against proposals to scrap tax breaks for agricultural diesel. The farmers also protested against the EU–Mercosur free trade agreement. In the Netherlands, farmers protested against reductions in nitrogen emissions.

The methodology of the farmers is often street blockades and protesting. There are also often occupations, demonstrations, illegal dumping and barricades done by farmers, especially in the Netherlands and France.

== Farmers protests by country ==
Member states of the European Union where farmers' protests are ongoing as of February 2024

=== Belgium ===
The Belgian farmers' protests began on 1 February 2024 and ended on 26 February 2024. Farmers and the farmers' unions protested over their standard of living and lower income than before. Several key protests took place in the European Quarter of Brussels, surrounding the European Parliament.

=== France ===
The farmers' protests in France were a combination of protests and road blockages; these protests and blockades had been organized mainly by agricultural unions since 18 January 2024. The farmers protests' began on a small scale in October 2023 in Occitania. On 16 January 2024, farmers in Toulouse began a demonstration, which evolved into a road blockade of the A64 autoroute by Occitan farmers and even a radical action of winemakers. Road blockades were ongoing and common from 23 January 2024 until Prime Minister Gabriel Attal conceded on 1 February.

=== Germany ===
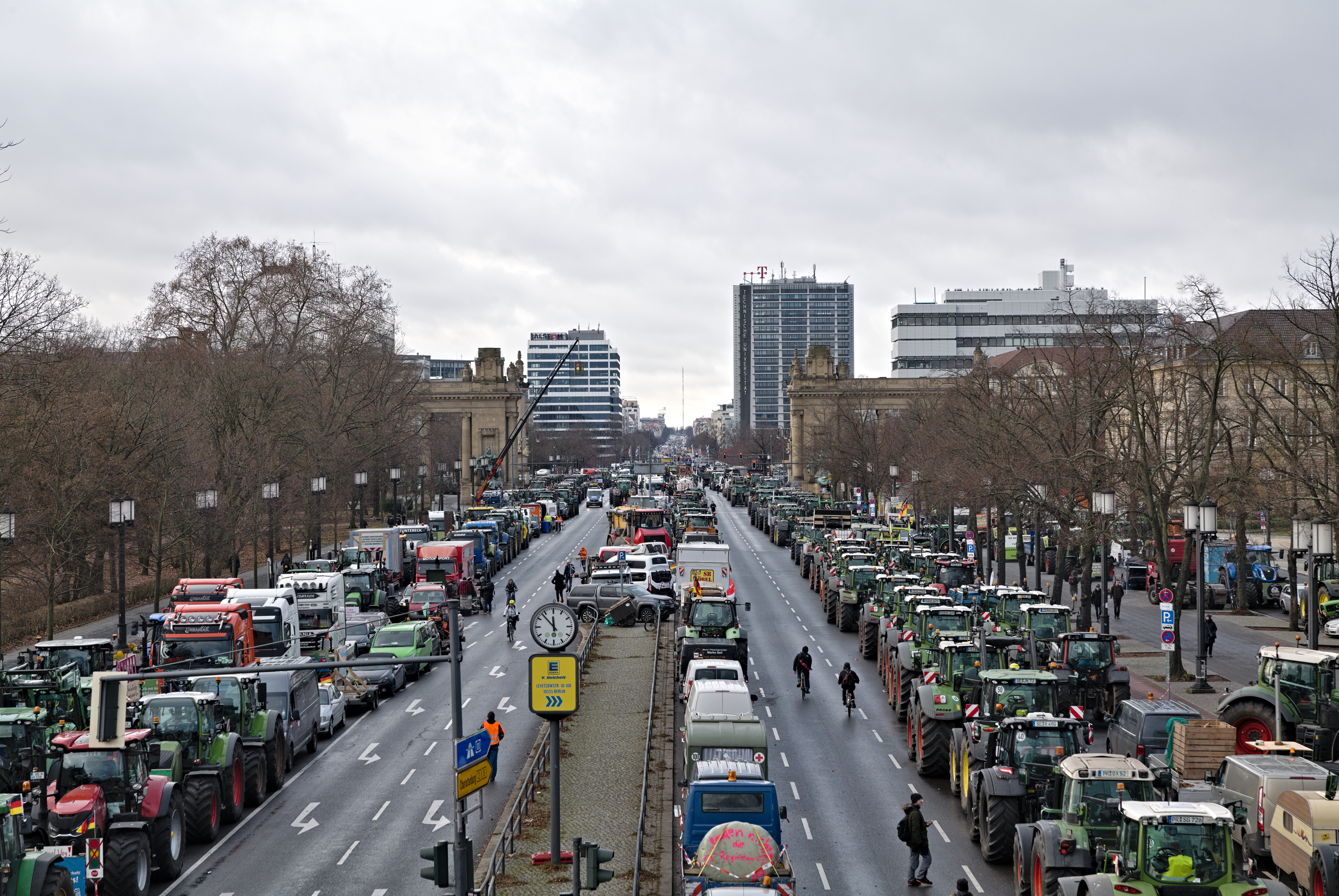
Farmer protest in Berlin, Germany on 15 January 2024

Farmers' protests in Germany began on a major scale on 16 December 2023 in response to the phasing out of tax breaks for diesel subsidies by the German government due to their unconstitutional misuse of COVID-19 relief funds. In Germany, the opposition parties, such as Alternative for Germany and the Christian Democratic Union of Germany, have supported the protestors.

=== Netherlands ===
The farmers' protests in the Netherlands have been ongoing since October 2019 and are a response to government proposals and legislation aimed at limiting human impact on the nitrogen cycle, in order to address the Dutch nitrogen crisis. Most notably, the Dutch farmers' protests contributed to the rapid electoral rise of the Farmer–Citizen Movement in 2023, when it won 16 out of 75 seats in the Senate election and 7 out of 150 parliamentary seats in the general election, and became a ruling party in the Schoof cabinet.

=== Poland ===
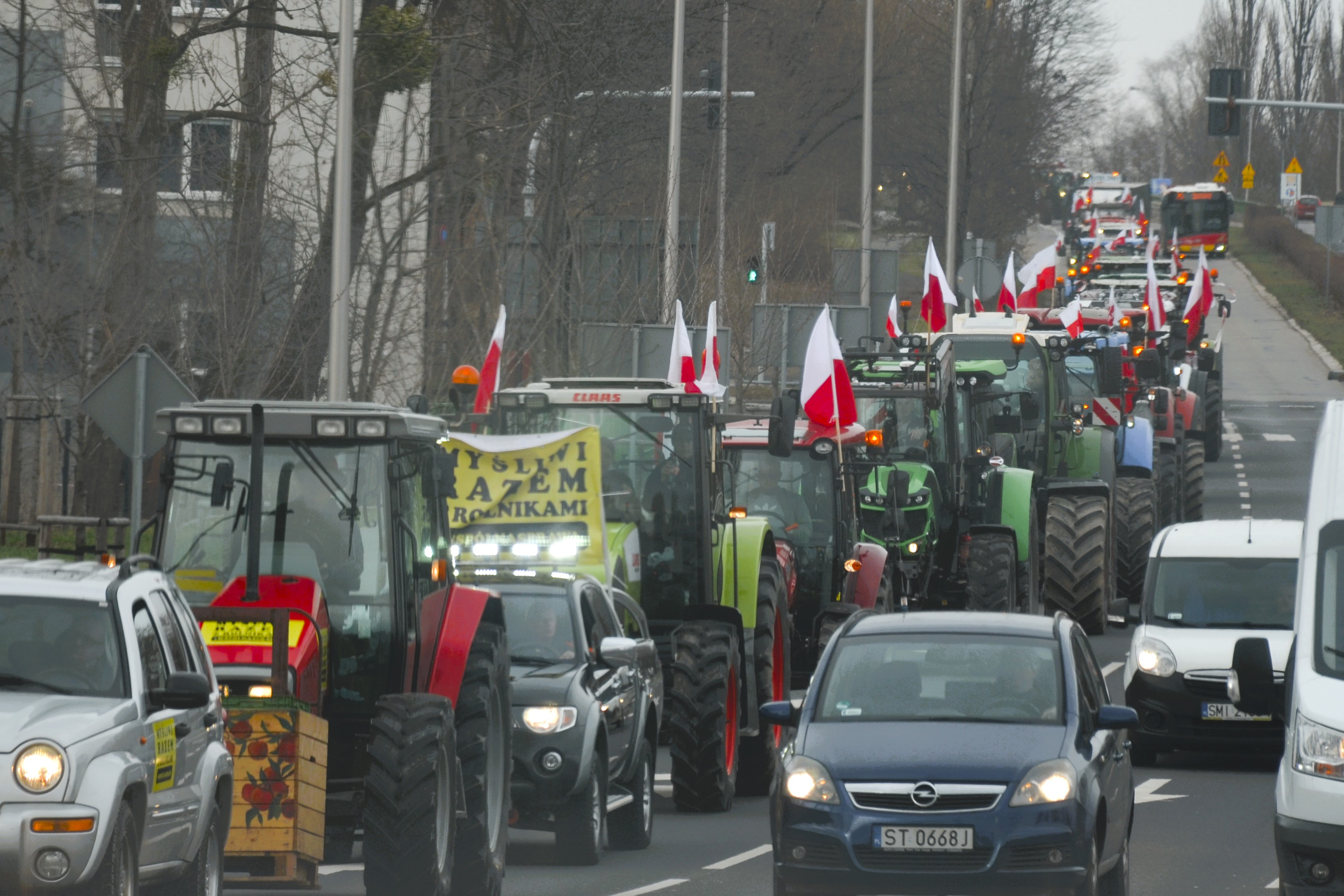
Farmers' protest in Bielsko-Biała, Poland on 22 February 2024

In Poland, the farmers' protests began on 9 February 2024 in response to the European Green Deal, along with the importation of Ukrainian grain into Poland and the wider European Union. Polish beekeepers, farmers, truckers and foresters began protesting, with nearly all farmers' unions supporting the protests. Roads and highways were often blocked by Polish farmers and truckers.

=== Spain ===
On 3 June 2024, Catalan farmers' platform Spanish Revolta Pagesa organized with several Spanish and French farmer unions to block crossing points along the Spanish-French border from Irun to La Jonquera across the Pyrenees. About 150 tractors blocked crossings on the Spanish side of the border, while about six tractors blocked traffic from the French side, allowing only medical, emergency, and school transport vehicles to pass. About 200 farmers also blocked the Andorra–Spain border at La Farga de Moles. The protesters' goal was to prioritize local production, to push tax breaks on energy used to produce food, and to push equal requirements, greater food security, and preference for EU products over non-EU imports. The date of the protest was meant to pressure EU institutions prior to Elections for the EU Parliament.

== Responses ==
=== Governments ===
- Emmanuel Macron has urged European leaders to bring about a reform to the farming sector and to guarantee fair prices to farmers. Gabriel Attal, the Prime Minister of France, announced an aid package worth $160 million in aid for French farmers in need of the financial aid.
- (Germany) Christian Lindner, who is the German Federal Minister of Finance said that the German Government cannot afford to help farmers, saying "There is no more money."

=== European Union ===
- The European Union has conceded to some farmers' demands, especially those of Polish farmers, agreeing to implement a cap on tariff-free Ukrainian grain imports.

=== Misinformation ===
The European fact-checking sites Newtral and Science Feedback analyzed that the farmers' protest is being weaponized to sabotage climate action.

== See also ==
- List of protests in the 21st century
- 2020–2021 Indian farmers' protest
- 2024–2025 Indian farmers' protest
- 2024–2026 United Kingdom farmers' protests
