= Stefanie Klee =

German politician (born 1982)

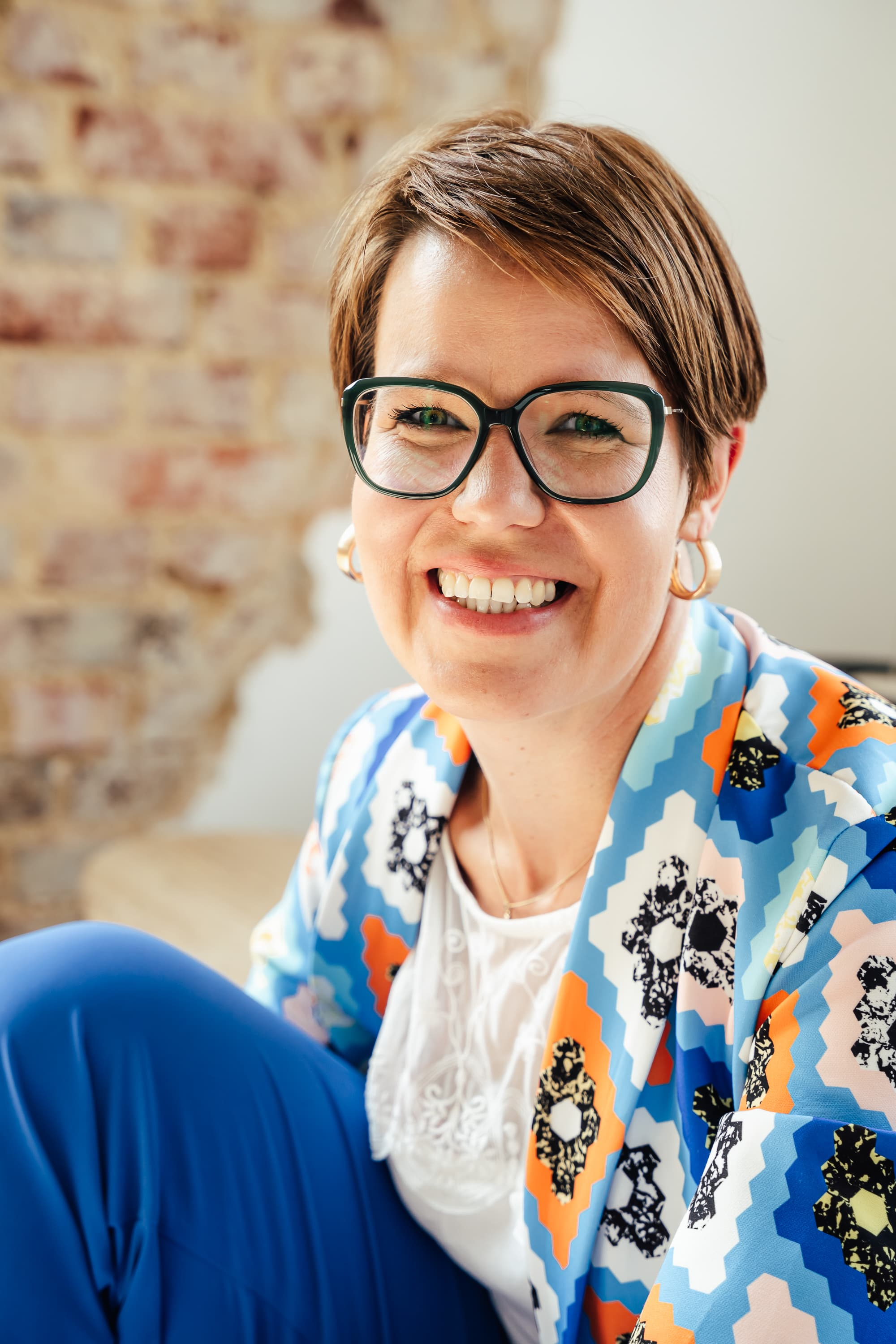
- Klee in 2024

Member of the Landtag of Hesse
- Incumbent
- Assumed office 18 January 2024
- Preceded by: Tanja Hartdegen
- Constituency: Hersfeld

Personal details
- Born: 29 September 1982 (age 44)
- Party: Christian Democratic Union

Stefanie Klee (born 29 September 1982) is a German politician serving as a member of the Landtag of Hesse since 2024. She has served as president of the Hessischer Musikverband since 2025.
