= 2020–2021 Peruvian agrarian strike =

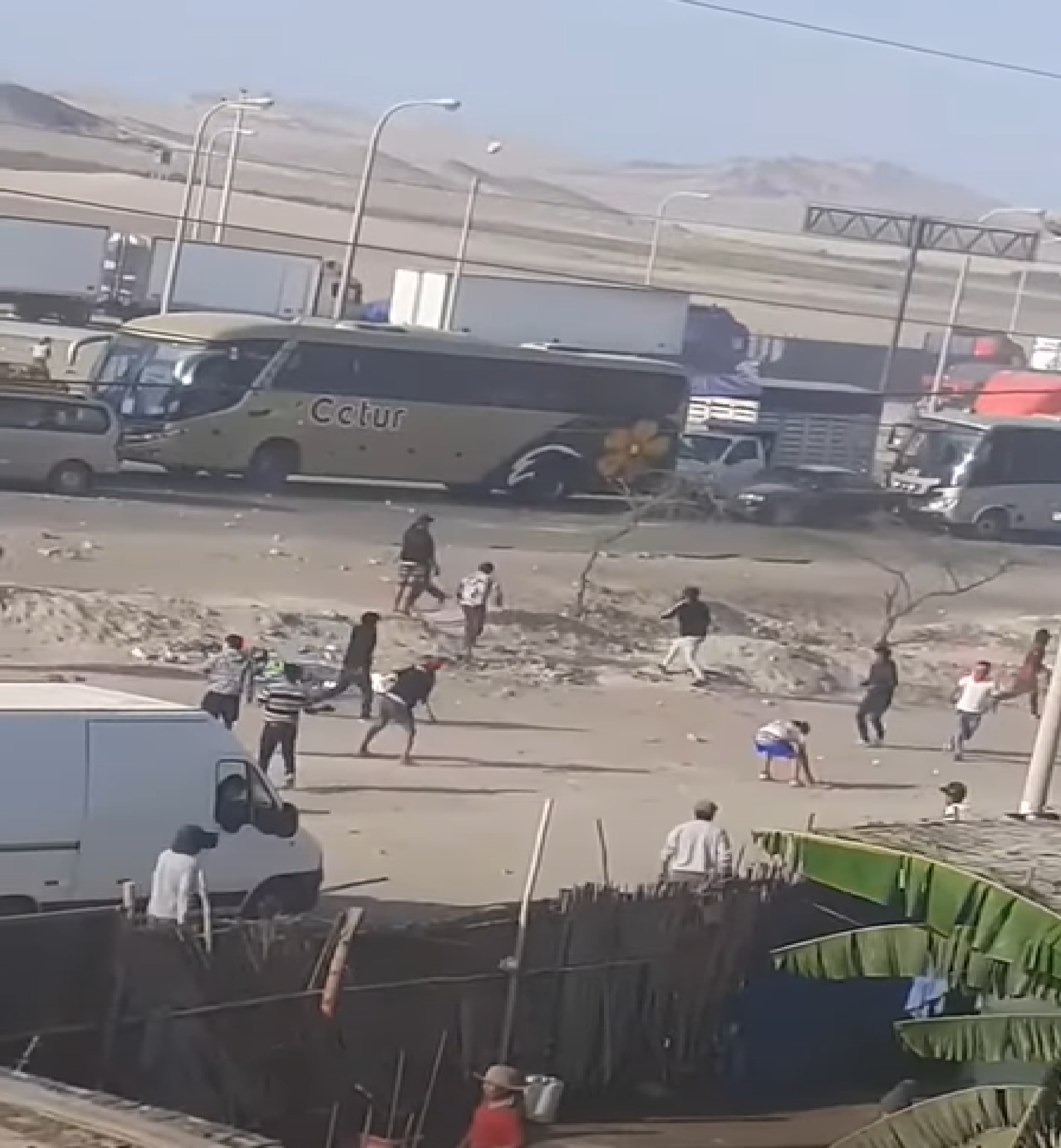
- Date: November 30, 2020 – January 17, 2021
- Location: Peru
- Caused by: Farmer law; Police violence during 2020 Peruvian protests; Government mishandling of the COVID-19 pandemic
- Goals: Resignation of President Francisco Sagasti; Repeal of Farmer’s act
- Methods: demonstrations, Riots, Roadblocks, General strike
- Result: Protests suppressed by force; Repeal of agricultural law

Deaths and injuries
- Deaths: 12
- Injuries: 44

A series of protests took place in Peru, initially in the department of Ica, beginning November 30, 2020, by farmers who reported being victims of mistreatment and poor working conditions. They were joined by farmers from the department of La Libertad. The workers requested the repeal of the Agrarian Promotion Law, whose validity had been extended the previous year, in the Government of President Martín Vizcarra, until December 31, 2031. The protesters were heard by the Council of Ministers, who in conversations with Congress, after several days approved Bill No. 5759 that repealed Law No. 27360. Thus, on the fifth day of the agricultural strike, The protesters released the Panamericana Sur highway. The protests left two dead. On December 21, a day after the parliamentarians in the Congress of the Republic failed to reach an agreement to approve the new agrarian law, the protesters took up the blockade of the Panamericana Sur highway. The agricultural unions announced that it will be officially developed A national agricultural strike since December 29, 2020. Since the restart of the strike, twelve deaths have been registered, all in the department of La Libertad. On January 17, the last protest related to the agrarian strike was registered, by protesters demanding justice for the deceased.

== See also ==
- 2020 Peruvian protests
