= Saint-Étienne-de-Fontbellon =

- Commune
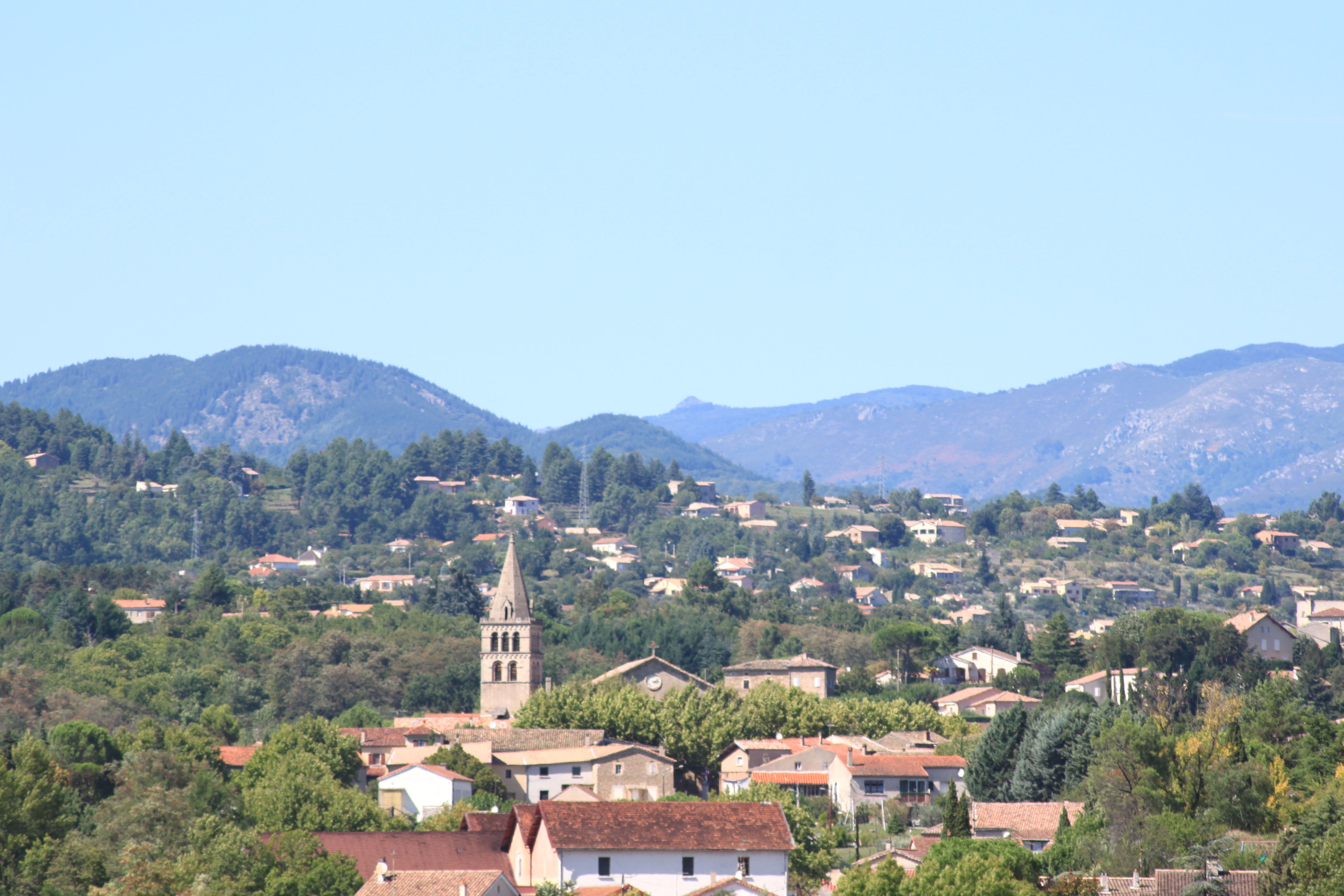
- A general view of Saint-Étienne-de-Fontbellon
- Location of Saint-Étienne-de-Fontbellon
- Location within France Location within Auvergne-Rhône-Alpes
- Coordinates: 44°36′06″N 4°23′14″E
- Country: France
- Region: Auvergne-Rhône-Alpes
- Department: Ardèche
- Arrondissement: Largentière
- Canton: Aubenas-2

Government
  - Mayor (2020–2026): Philippe Roux
- Area^{1}: 9.51 km^{2} (3.67 sq mi)
- Elevation: 216 m (709 ft)
- Highest elevation: 406 m (1,332 ft)
- Lowest elevation: 167 m (548 ft)
- Population (2023): 2,920
  - Density: 307/km^{2} (795/sq mi)
- Time zone: UTC+01:00 (CET)
  - Summer (DST): UTC+02:00 (CEST)
- INSEE/Postal code: 07231 /07200
- ^{1} French Land Register data, which excludes lakes, ponds, glaciers > 1 km^{2} (0.386 sq mi or 247 acres) and river estuaries.

Saint-Étienne-de-Fontbellon (French pronunciation: [sɛ̃.t‿etjɛn də fɔ̃bɛlɔ̃]; Occitan: Sant Estève de Fontbelon) is a commune in the Ardèche department in southern France.

== Population ==
Historical population
Year	Pop.	±% p.a.
1968	1,163	—
1975	1,603	+4.69%
1982	1,906	+2.50%
1990	2,143	+1.48%
1999	2,297	+0.77%
2007	2,483	+0.98%
2012	2,531	+0.38%
2017	2,717	+1.43%
2023	2,920	+1.21%
Source: INSEE

== See also ==
- Communes of the Ardèche department
