= 2023–2024 German farmers' protests =

Protests in Germany over abolition of tax breaks for farmers

- Part of the 2023–2024 European Union farmers' protests
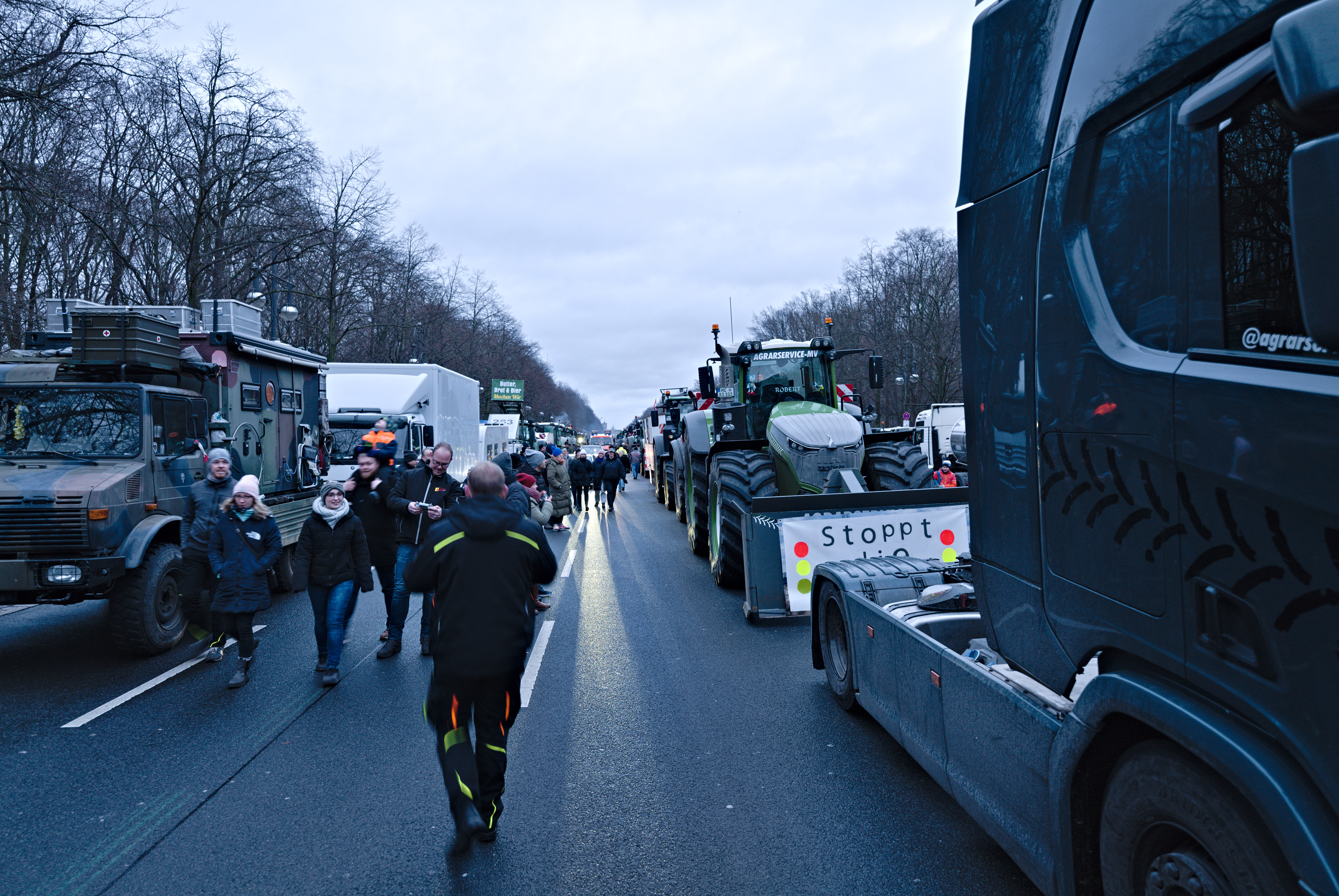
- Date: December 18, 2023 - 2024
- Location: Germany
- Goals: Exemption of farmers from tax on motor vehicles
- Methods: Political demonstration, nonviolent resistance
- Status: Protests have stopped for the most part

Parties
LsV Deutschland; Deutscher Bauernverband; Alternative for Germany; Freie Wahler; Christian Democratic Union; Die Linke (factions)	Scholz cabinet

The 2023–2024 German farmers' protests were a series of nationwide protests and road blockages in Germany organized by farmers and agricultural unions from 18 December 2023 until March 2024. The subjects of the protests were the abolition of tax breaks on farmers and other policies of the federal government under the Scholz cabinet.

== Background ==
In its ruling of 15 November 2023, the Federal Constitutional Court declared the second supplementary budget for 2021 as unconstitutional and therefore invalid. The German Bundestag, under the leadership of the Scholz cabinet, had attempted to use the unused debts of the COVID-19 "special fund" for the 2021 budget. This resulted in a budget deficit of 17 billion euros for the 2024 federal budget. Among the measures taken by the federal government to remedy this were the introduction of a motor vehicle tax and the cancellation of the crude oil tax refund for farmers.

Various commentators put forward alternative ideas on how the budget deficit could potentially be eliminated by other means.

The agreement reached by the federal government is predicted to lead to greater financial burdens in 2024, particularly for those with a low to average income, while relieving the burden on those with a higher income. For the agricultural sector, the responsible minister Cem Özdemir (The Greens) announced the abolition of subsidies for agricultural diesel and the introduction of a vehicle tax for agricultural vehicles (previously green license plates).

As early as June 2023, there were plans to declare subsidised diesel a bargaining chip, as reported by the trade journal Agrarzeitung. These announcements led to nationwide protests by farmers against the agricultural policy pursued in Germany for several years. To publicise the farmers' goals and demands, dairy farmer Werner Koslowski from Wohnste undertook a tour of Germany, during which he presented a list of demands to several German state governments.

According to a report published by the German Farmers' Association (DBV) in December 2023, German farmers in main occupation achieved an average profit of 115,400 euros in the 2022/2023 financial year, which is an "all-time high" and around 45 percent more than in the previous year. However, the earnings situation varies greatly between small, medium-sized and large farms.

== Organization of the protests ==
The initially decentralized protests were supported in their initial phase by Landwirtschaft verbindet Deutschland (LsV Deutschland). The large-scale demonstration in Berlin on 18 December 2023 was organized by an alliance of agricultural organizations around LsV Deutschland and the DBV, which called for a week "of action on agricultural diesel and vehicle tax exemption" starting on 8 January. In addition, a number of other organizations, including freight forwarders, craftsmen, fishermen and hunters, joined the calling.

A commonly observed silent form of protest involved hanging rubber boots on town signs, with which farmers show their dissatisfaction with agricultural policy, and are signaling that farmers are hanging up their wellies and that there is no more regional food as a result.

== Political demands and developments ==
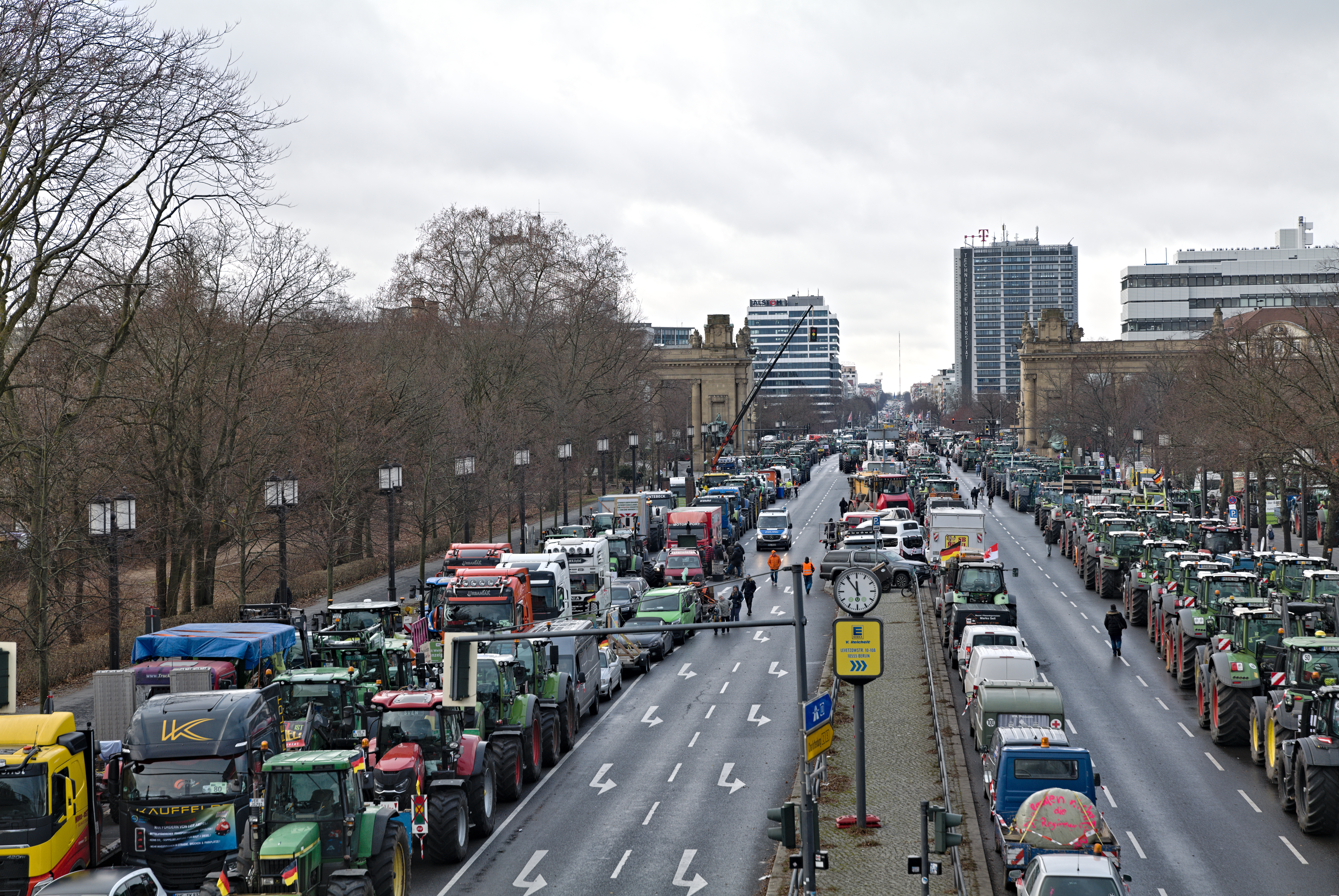
German farmers' protest in Berlin, 15 January 2024

Alongside LsV Deutschland, the farmers' association called for the "planned tax increases to be withdrawn". Further support for agricultural diesel and the motor vehicle tax exemption are regarded as essential for competitive agriculture in the country. Some protesting farmers demanded the then Scholz-led federal government to resign entirely.

On 4 January 2024, the government declared a partial withdrawal of the resolutions. The introduction of an agricultural vehicle tax was to be scrapped and the tax subsidy on agricultural diesel was to be gradually withdrawn over three years. The German Farmers' Association and LsV Germany rejected these proposals as insufficient and demanded the complete withdrawal of all additional burdens.

LsV Germany presented a "five-point system" on 14 January 2024. Its key demands include binding criteria for imported agricultural products, mandatory labeling of the origin of foreign agricultural products, a ban on dumping in the Supply Chain Act, a ban on unfair trading practices, regulation of wolf populations in rural areas (wolf management) and a reduction in bureaucracy.

In mid-February 2024, agricultural economist Sebastian Lakner commented on farmers' anger, stating that farmers being expected to produce sustainable products that comply with all environmental and social standards, respect animal welfare and promote biodiversity whilst agricultural products from outside Europe simultaneously entering the market without meeting any of the enforced objectives was a major double standard. He called for further targeted support and also saw consumers as having a responsibility: "How much does it cost, how much is sustainability actually worth to me?"

Towards the later half of the protests' duration, the farmers also directed the protests towards the mainstream media via protesting in front of broadcasting stations with tractors and blocking newspaper deliveries. The background to this is what many farmers perceive as a "one-sided" portrayal of the situation of farmers and the demonstrations, such as a broadcast on 12 January showing a half-empty fairground in Nuremberg, even though it was later packed to capacity during the demonstration. The German Farmers' Association criticised actions against the media, labeling the media as the "wrong target" and citing fundamental concerns over the preservation of press freedom in general.

Among the protesters, a black flag was widely used as the logo of the anti-Semitic and anti-democratic Landvolk movement, which had been designed in 1928 by Peter Petersen, who later became an NPD member of the Schleswig-Holstein state parliament. The use of this flag was criticised by politicians, historians and the protesting farmers themselves.

== Protests ==
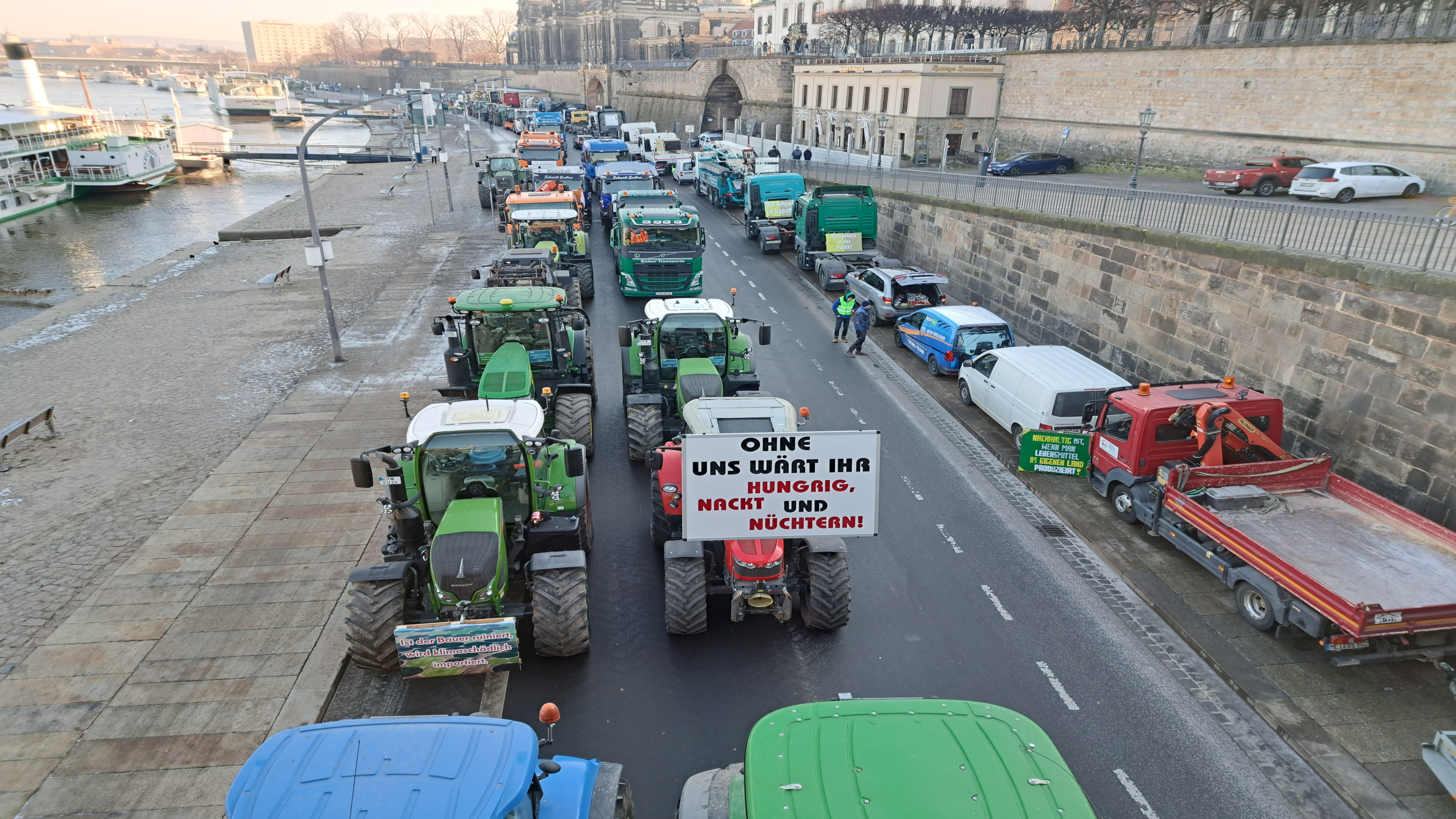
Farmer protest in Dresden, 10 January 2024

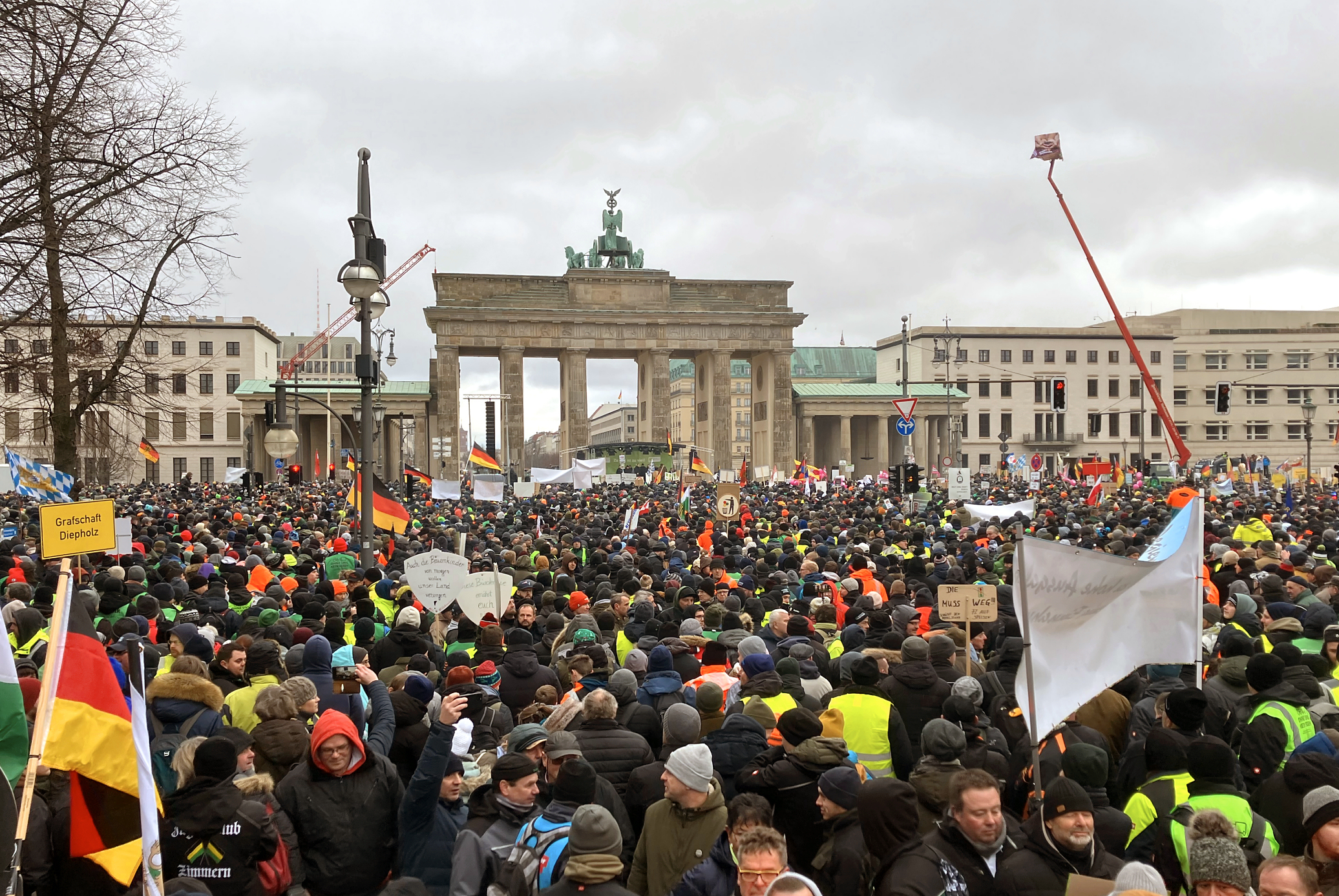
Farmer protest in Berlin, 15 January 2024

On 18 December 2023, the German Farmers' Association called for a demonstration with tractors under the slogan "Too much is too much! Now it's over!" in Berlin. Around 6,600 people gathered at a rally in front of the Brandenburg Gate. Farmers' president Joachim Rukwied called for agricultural subsidies to be maintained. Similar protests took place in other cities in Germany, including Freiburg, Leipzig, and Chemnitz.

Public attention of the protests increased when on 4 January 2024, a group of 100 farmers alongside other protesters blocked the Hilligenlei ferry in the port of Schlüttsiel in North Frisia, in which then-Federal Minister of Economics Robert Habeck and his wife were on their way back from a private day trip. After the demonstrators declined Habeck's offer to send a small delegation on the ferry, and he refused to address the crowd personally for reasons of privacy, the ferry set sail again. The call to gather at the ferry was spread along by forces such as a former member of the AfD who learned about Habeck's day trip plans, as well as the group "Freie Schleswig-Holsteiner" (Free Schleswig-Holsteiners).

Individual protests across the country continued throughout the beginning of January, with a collective, coordinated blockage of several highway access roads with rallies throughout Germany taking place on 8 January, the beginning of the protesters' week of action. This led to the Workers’ Welfare Association filing a criminal complaint due to employees, patients and deliveries being unable to reach the AWO hospital in Jerichow.

The week of action, as well as the following weeks, saw a significant increase in the size of the demonstrations, with thousands of protesters and tractors gathering in major cities such as Dresden, Kassel, Düsseldorf, Hannover, Hamburg, Kiel, and Leipzig, where they protested alongside Fridays for Future. Central warehouses of food discounters throughout Germany were also blocked with tractors as part of the protests. In Cottbus, Brandenburg's Minister President Dietmar Woidke (SPD) declared his full support for the farmers' demands to cancel the tax increases.

On the night of 15 January, farmers, hauliers, tradespeople and civilians gathered in Berlin in front of the Brandenburg gate for a large demonstration. Over 6,000 tractors were brought to block the city centre with a rally, and estimates on the amount of protesters vary between 8,500 from police reports and over 30,000 from reports of the organisers. The demonstration was largely peaceful.

The then-Federal Finance Minister Christian Lindner (FDP) attempted to give a speech and declared that the government would not deviate from its plans to raise taxes. At the same time, at 12 noon, the German Bundestag's petitions committee began hearing a petition for the cancellation of subsidy cuts, based on an official digital petition with over 75,000 signatures. Previously, over 1.1 million citizens had already shown their support on a similar digital petition on change.org.

== Public reactions ==
Numerous professional associations, interest groups, clubs, foundations and citizens announced their active support for the farmers' protests from 18 December and took part in protests, including freight forwarders, hunters' associations, coastal fishermen, and craftsmen.

In terms of political parties, the Free Voters of Bavaria showed solidarity: On 6 January 2024, Minister of Economic Affairs Hubert Aiwanger described the farmers' protests as "political self-defense". The AfD expressed solidarity with the protests and linked them to its own political demands, although its party manifesto rejects subsidies in principle. The spokesperson for the farmers' association distanced himself from this statement.

Various politicians from the CDU/CSU, such as Markus Söder, Friedrich Merz, and Carsten Linnemann, expressed support for the farmers. Members of the Thuringian state parliament from the CDU called for participation in the protests. Hessian state parliament member Stefanie Klee (CDU) took part in the protests on a tugboat. Sahra Wagenknecht (BSW) expressed support for the farmers, and called Robert Habeck's reaction to the ferry blockade on 4 January "embarrassing and whiny".

In the Saxon state election campaign, the CDU adopted the demands of the farmers' protests as its own. An election poster depicted an angry farmer with a pitchfork and the text "The traffic light coalition wants farmers on the tank - hands off agricultural diesel". This was met with criticism from former Federal Environment Minister Jürgen Trittin (The Greens), who saw it as an active call for violence; former Federal Minister Peter Altmaier (CDU) also called the aggressive imagery "disturbing", and claimed that it was damaging to the farmers' cause and the culture of political debate.

As a result of the farmers' protests, on 8 January 2024, CDU/CSU minister presidents Markus Söder in Bavaria, Boris Rhein in Hesse, Hendrik Wüst in North Rhine-Westphalia, and Kai Wegner in Berlin among others, as well as SPD minister presidents Manuela Schwesig in Mecklenburg-Vorpommern, Dietmar Woidke in Brandenburg, Stephan Weil in Lower Saxony and Anke Rehlinger in Saarland supported the preservation of the diesel agricultural subsidy for farmers. On 18 January, the CDU/CSU parliamentary group put a motion on the agenda of the Bundestag plenary session to guarantee permanent agricultural diesel relief for agriculture and forestry.

The road blockades caused by the farmers' protests have been reported to have led to some road users engaging in violent acts against the protesters.

On 11 February 2024, at around 2:45 a.m., a fire broke out at an agricultural business in Oelsnitz, Erzgebirge. A tractor was on fire on site and a facade was found smeared with the words "Stop blockading - otherwise everything will burn". The police have launched an investigation into this suspected attack.

== Criticism ==
Federal Finance Minister Christian Lindner (FDP) criticized some of the actions taken during the protests, especially after the blockade of Habeck on a ferry. Susanne Gaschke assessed this blockade in the Neue Zürcher Zeitung (NZZ) with reference to the statement of the shipowner as "unacceptable coercion" and a threat to Habeck, who had been travelling privately. Journalist Jakob Banke, on the other hand, highlighted the statement of a participant and the video recordings, which showed that the demonstration had been peaceful.

DBV president Joachim Rukwied stated that actions such as those in Schlüttsiel would harm the farmers' political cause. A video from Norddeutscher Rundfunk shows a montage of fireworks being set off at the end of the blockade, but this was cut before the earlier scenes immediately during the departure process, giving the impression that people were being pushed towards the departing ferry under the impression of the fireworks.

The Federal Ministry of the Interior, the Federal Office for the Protection of the Constitution and the Federal Criminal Police Office warned of infiltration of the protests by right-wing extremist groups. Banners of the right-wing extremist party Die Heimat (formerly NPD) had reportedly been seen at some demonstrations. DBV President Joachim Rukwied distanced himself from such slogans: "Right-wingers and other radical groups such as the monarchist, Freie Sachsen party, and the neo-Nazi, Third Path with a desire for subversion" were not wanted at the demonstrations. Saxony's Interior Minister Armin Schuster (CDU) stated that he saw no signs of right-wing extremists infiltrating the farmers' protests: "The farmers have already clearly distanced themselves from right-wing extremist aspirations in advance. This has had an effect, so one cannot speak of infiltration."

On 4 January 2024, Florian von Brunn from the BayernSPD urged for any criminal acts and violations of the law during the protests to be treated by police by the same standards as the street blockades of the Last Generation. Opinion pieces published by Bayerischer Rundfunk and the Schleswig-Holsteinische Zeitung criticized that the public reaction to the blockades of the farmers' protests was more positive than to the street blockades of Last Generation, and that double standards were at play.

== See also ==
- 2023–2024 European Union farmers' protests
  - Dutch farmers' protests
  - 2023–2025 Czech Union farmers' protests
  - 2020s French farmers' protests
  - 2024 Polish farmers' protests
