= 2024 Polish farmers' protests =

2024 civil unrest in Poland

- Part of the 2023–2024 European Union farmers' protests
- Date: Early 2024
- Location: Poland
- Goals: End of grain imports from Ukraine, Regulation of EU policies
- Methods: Protests; Street blockades; Free tolls
- Status: Protests gradually Stopped

Parties
Rural Solidarity; Confederation Liberty and Independence; Law and Justice; Rodacy Kamraci; Eurosceptics; Nonpartisan Local Government Activists; Edward Gierek's Economic Revival Movement	Civic Platform; European Union; Poland 2050; Union of European Democrats; Green Deal activists

The 2024 Polish farmer protests were a series of protests and road blockades which occurred in early 2024 when Rural Solidarity, the largest farmers' union in Poland, called a strike to protest against the European Green Deal and continued grain imports from Ukraine.

== Background ==
On 31 January 2024, the European Commission renewed the suspension of import duties and quotas on Ukrainian grain exports to the European Union until 2025 while reinforcing protection for sensitive EU agricultural products. This, as well as the restrictions that the European Green Deal would impose upon Polish farmers, led to Polish farmers, truckers, beekeepers, and foresters blocking 260 major roads across the country with their tractors. Nearly all the farmers' unions in the country backed the protests, as the "solidarity corridors" established by the EU to facilitate food exports from Ukraine amid the Russo-Ukrainian War led to much of the Ukrainian produce being stuck in the Polish market rather than transiting further. This caused a decline in the demand and prices for local Polish production, as Ukrainian grain, flour, poultry, eggs, sugar, milk, frozen soft fruit, and even apple juice saturated the Polish market. These Ukrainian goods were widely viewed as being of low-quality, as batches of raspberries were supposed to enter the country.

== Protest ==
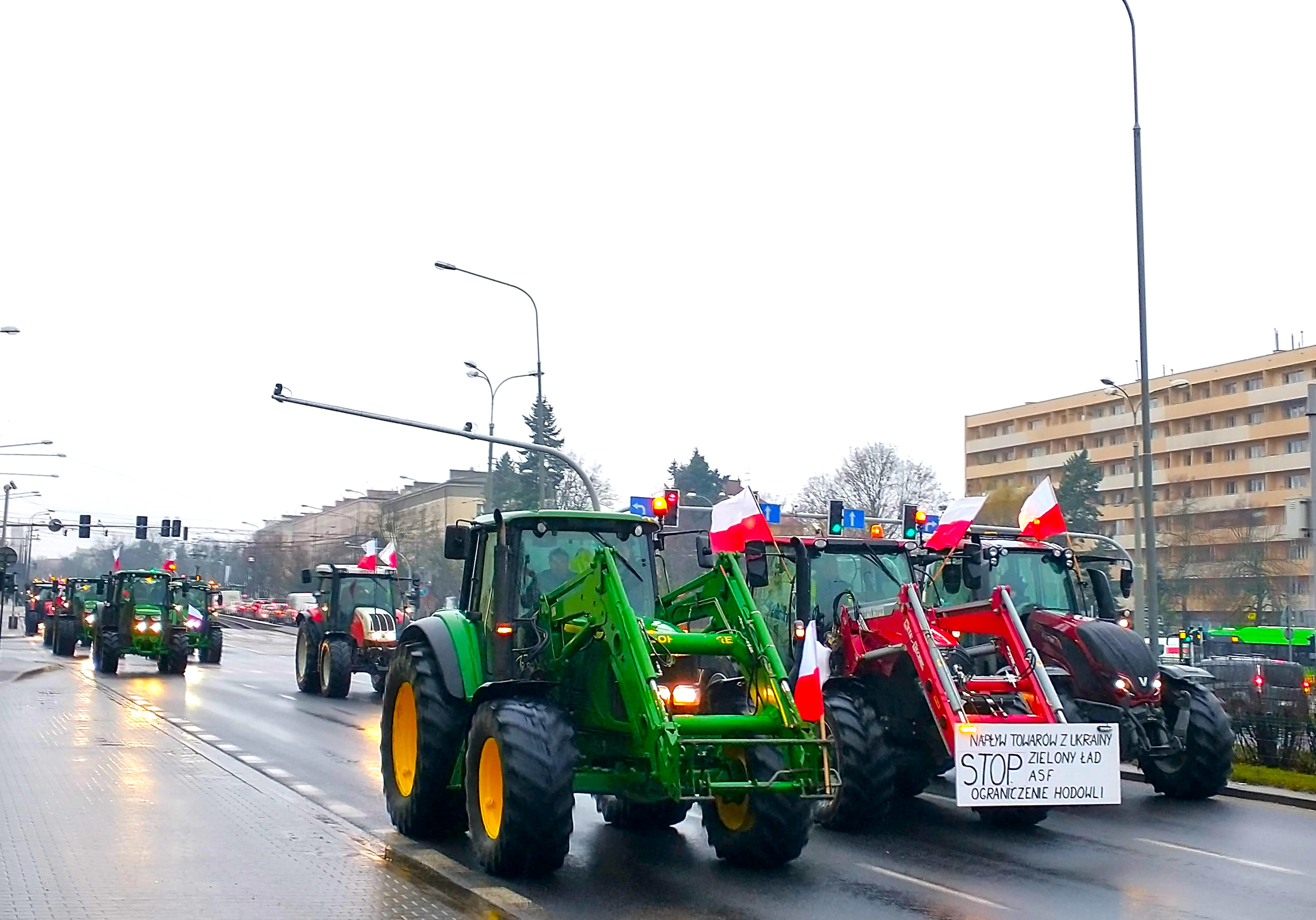
Farmers' protest in Poznań on 9 February 2024

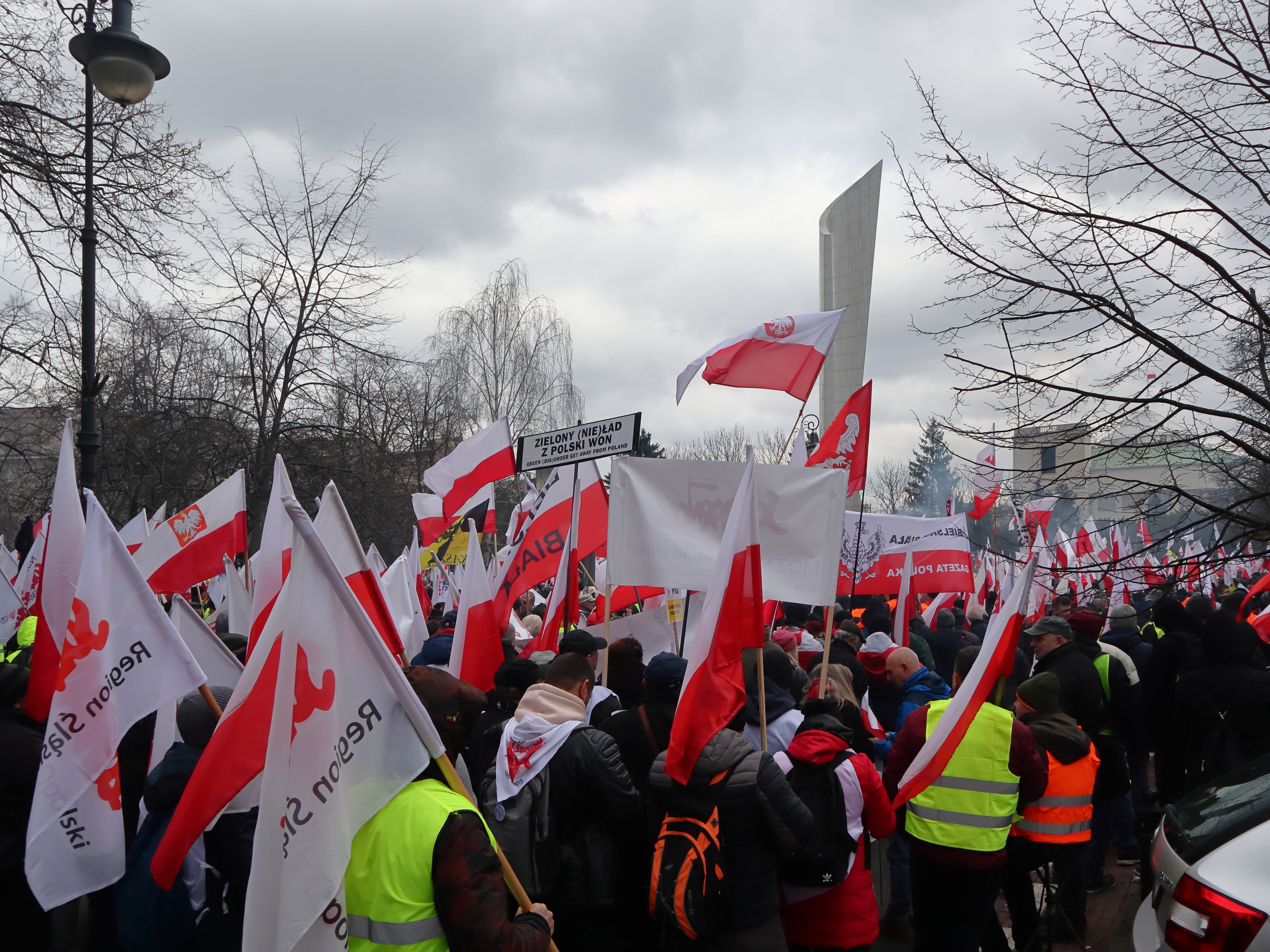
Farmers' protest in Warsaw on 6 March 2024

On 20 February 2024, Polish farmers pried open two Ukrainian freight cars at the Medyka border crossing and spilled grain on the tracks. The Polish farmers also protested greenhouse emissions regulations and enhanced animal welfare laws brought about by the European Green Deal, and their protests received the sympathy of Slovak and Czech farmers, whose organizations urged joint action.

On 21 February 2024, Poland's foreign ministry denounced pro-Putin and anti-Ukrainian slogans at farmers' protests, saying that they were possibly influenced by Russia. This came as Estonian president Kaja Kallas revealed that her government had thwarted a Russian hybrid operation meant to foment civil unrest in the country. Some farmers' banners read "Putin, get Ukraine, Brussels and our government in order." The Polish foreign ministry expressed its belief that the banners were an attempt to take over the agricultural protest movement by "extreme and irresponsible groups, possibly under the influence of Russian agents".

On 6 March 2024, protesters clashed with police outside the lower house of Polish parliament in Warsaw.

The European Union has conceded to some farmers' demands, agreeing to implement cap on tariff–free Ukrainian grain imports.

Responding to protests by Polish farmers, Polish Prime Minister Donald Tusk said he would push for changes to the European Green Deal.

On 6 November 2024, Polish farmers started to protest in Medyka, near the Ukrainian border to protest against the 2024 agricultural tax rate and the free trade deal that the European Union was signing with South America.

Only one truck every hour was allowed to pass from Poland to Ukraine, whereas only humanitarian vehicles or military convoys were permitted to travel to Ukraine.

== See also ==
- 2023–2024 European Union farmers' protests
  - Dutch farmers' protests
  - 2023–2025 Czech Union farmers' protests
  - 2023–2024 German farmers' protests
  - 2020s French farmers' protests
