= 2023–2025 Czech Union farmers' protests =

The 2023–2025 Czech farmers' protests are a series of demonstrations driven by opposition to European Union agricultural policies, trade agreements, and environmental regulations. Centered on grievances over unfair competition, rising costs, and bureaucratic burdens, the protests highlighted tensions between Czech farmers and the EU's Green Deal initiatives.

== Environmental policies ==
Environmental policies further fueled discontent, particularly the EU's Green Deal, which set ambitious targets such as halving pesticide use, reducing reliance on fertilizers, and designating arable land for biodiversity. Farmers resisted these measures, arguing they threatened food production and added regulatory burdens. Many also criticized the Common Agricultural Policy (CAP) for its complex compliance requirements, which they claimed increased bureaucracy without providing tangible benefits.

== Economic pressures ==
Economic pressures added to the unrest, as farmers struggled with low farm-gate prices and accused supermarkets of squeezing their margins. Rising production costs, exacerbated by inflation, surging fuel prices, and expensive fertilizers and labor, further heightened their grievances.

== Protest tactics ==
In response, farmers employed a range of disruptive protest tactics. Tractor blockades were staged in Prague and at border crossings, paralyzing traffic and government buildings. Manure dumping outside government offices became another symbol of defiance, leading to arrests. Czech farmers also participated in pan-European demonstrations, joining counterparts in Slovakia, Hungary, and Poland to temporarily obstruct roads at key border points. However, some protests became controversial due to the presence of far-right and pro-Russian elements, leading to accusations that legitimate grievances were being politically hijacked.

The protesters articulated clear demands, focusing on trade policy and regulatory reforms. They called for the cancellation of the EU-Mercosur agreement or at least the exclusion of agricultural products from the deal. Additionally, they demanded the reimposition of customs duties on Ukrainian imports. On the policy front, they sought withdrawal from the Green Deal or at least a delay in implementing its environmental targets. Simplification of CAP regulations and a reduction in bureaucratic red tape were also key concerns.

== Government's response ==
The government's response was mixed. Czech authorities accused some protest organizers of pushing political agendas unrelated to farming, particularly with alleged pro-Russian ties. Agriculture Minister Marek Vyborny emphasized ongoing negotiations with major agricultural associations but dismissed the protests as counterproductive. At the EU level, policymakers attempted to address some concerns by temporarily restricting Ukrainian grain imports to placate Central European farmers, though this move drew criticism for undermining the EU's climate commitments.

== European context ==
The Czech protests were part of a broader European movement, with similar demonstrations occurring in Poland, France, and Belgium. Czech farmers collaborated with their counterparts in neighboring Slovakia, Hungary, Poland, and Austria, reflecting shared frustrations over EU agricultural policies.

== 2025 protests ==
Hundreds of Czech farmers recently participated in pan-European protests against food imports from outside the European Union. They were calling for the cancellation of the EU-Mercosur trade agreement, an end to duty-free imports from Ukraine, and significant reductions in bureaucratic red tape. Farmers argued that local agricultural producers are being undermined by unfair foreign competition, as imports from countries like Ukraine and South America do not adhere to the strict norms binding European producers. This disparity, they claim, threatens the quality of Czech products and the sustainability of environmentally-friendly Czech agriculture.

The Agrarian Chamber of the Czech Republic has expressed concerns that the trade agreement with South American countries will lead to increased imports of sugar, beef, and poultry, thereby reducing prices on the European market and pushing out Czech producers. Additionally, the influx of cheap grain and oilseeds from Ukraine has had a devastating impact on local farmers, filling granaries and leaving no storage for new crops. Farmers demanded a significant reduction in bureaucratic hurdles imposed by EU regulations, noting that approximately 33% of European farmers spend six days a year on administrative tasks, leading to financial losses.

== See also ==
- 2023–2024 European Union farmers' protests
- 2023–2024 German farmers' protests
- 2024 Polish farmers' protests
