= 2020s French farmers' protests =

2024 civil unrest in France

- Part of the 2023–2024 European Union farmers' protests
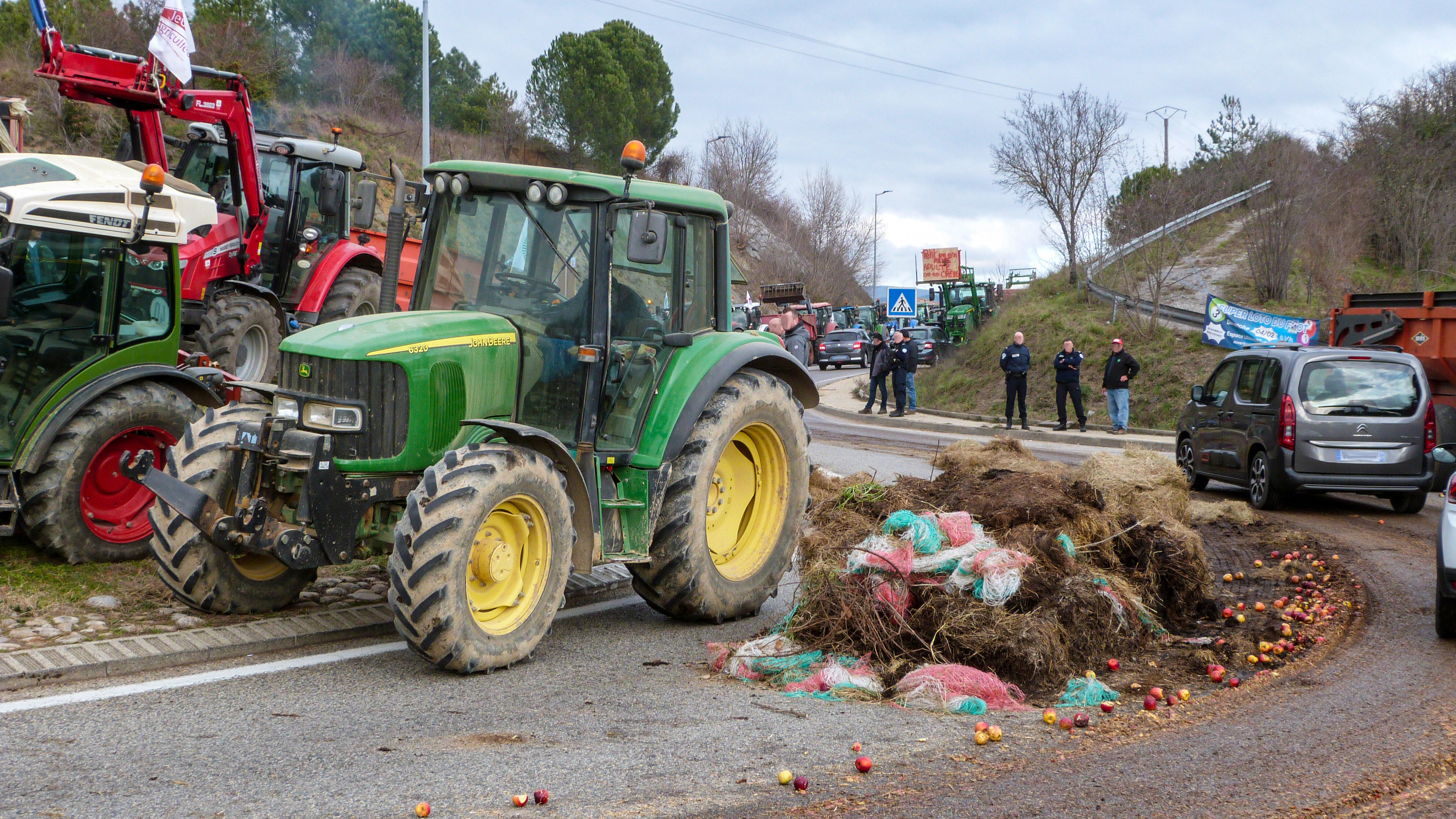
- Tractors at Saint-Etienne-de-Fontbellon (Ardèche, Auvergne-Rhône-Alpes) during the french farmers' protests in January 2024.
- Date: 16 January 2024 – June 2024
- Location: France
- Goals: End of the tax on diesel, payment of aid planned by the state, and end of free trade agreement negotiations
- Methods: Protests; Street blockades; Free tolls
- Status: Ended

Casualties
- Deaths: 2
- Injuries: 3
- Arrested: at least 91

The 2020s French farmers' protests are a series of protests and road blockages organized non unionized farmers and agricultural unions (FNSEA, Young Farmers, Rural Coordination, Confédération paysanne) since 18 January 2024. The farmers protested against low food prices, proposed reductions in state subsidies for farmers' diesel fuel, and a EU-Mercosur free trade agreement.

In response to the protests, Gabriel Attal's government scrapped proposed reductions in government subsidies for agricultural diesel and other measures to reduce financial and bureaucratic burdens for farmers, but the protests persisted.

== Chronology ==
Since October of 2023, smaller-scale pacific actions where have been carried out first in Occitania and then in other regions by farmers such as turning upside down municipal signage, this movement is called "On marche sur la tête", literally "we walk on the head" which is a french expression for "it's nonsense".

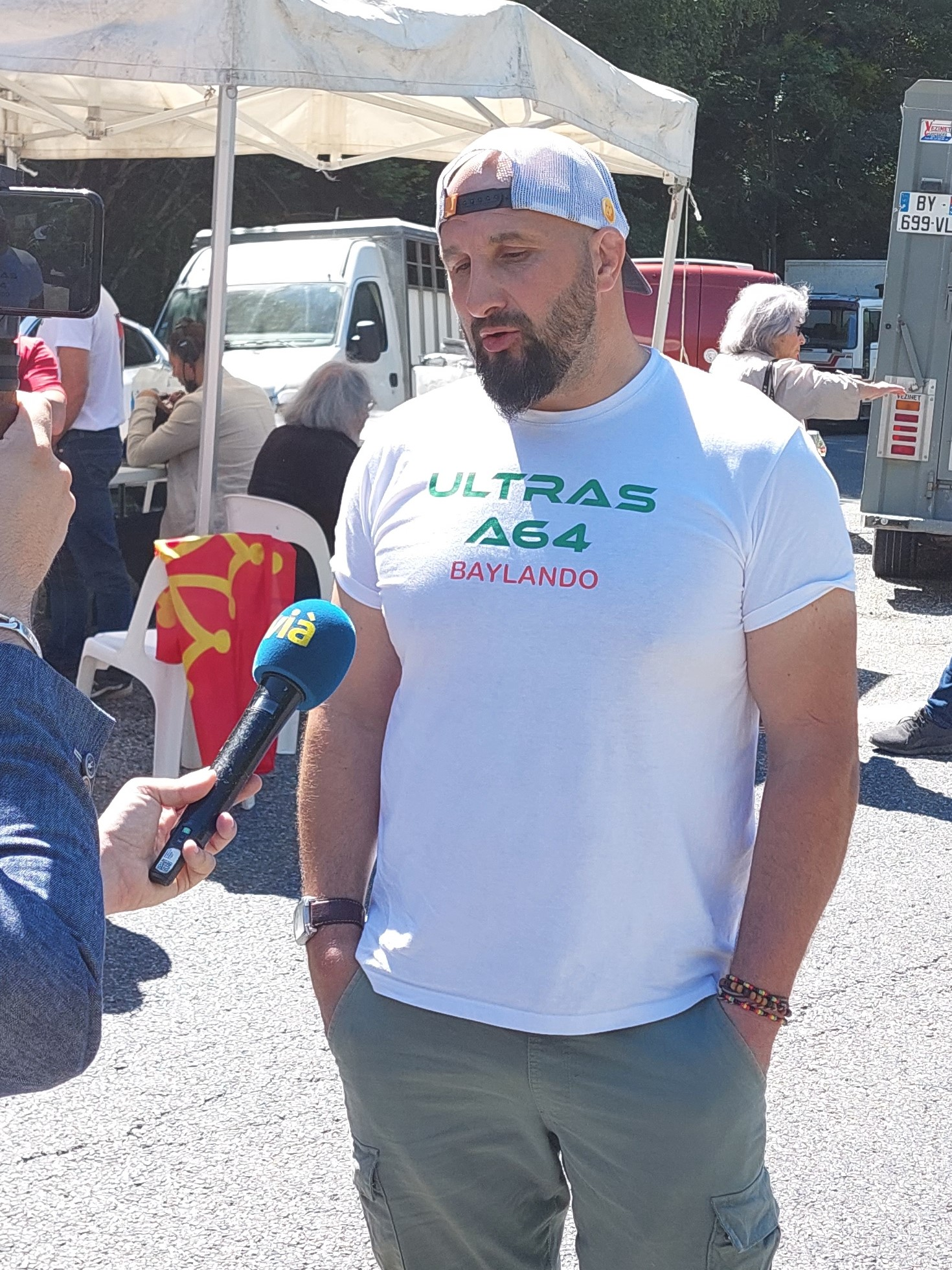
Jérôme Bayle, one of the leaders of the farmers' movement in France

The movement started from Occitania, first with a demonstration in Toulouse on 16 January, which had no impact. Occitan farmers (Jérôme Bayle) then decided to block the A64 motorway Toulouse-Tarbes on 18 January. The movement has damaged property, including government buildings. Thus, on the night of January 18 to 19, an administration building was blown up by an explosion in Carcassonne (Occitania). This act was claimed by the Comité Régional d'Action Viticole (CRAV), a radical Occitan group of winemakers.

On 23 January, a 37-year-old Occitan farmer and her 12-year-old daughter were killed after a car crashed into a roadblock where they were standing. The farmer's husband was badly injured.

Major roads have been affected in France from January 23. Protesters planned to besiege Paris starting January 29. Some Occitan activists from Lot-et-Garonne of the Rural coordination of Agen (Karine Duc and José Perez) even managed to enter the Rungis market (near Paris) but they were immediately arrested by the police.

The blockades of autoroutes were removed by 3 February 2024 after promises announced by Prime Minister Gabriel Attal on February 1. These protests are analogous to the 2024 Italian protests for agriculture.

On 3 June 2024, French farmer unions (The Ultras A64 of Jérôme Bayle and the Rural coordination) collaborated with the Catalan farmers' platform Spanish Revolta Pagesa and other Spanish farmer unions to help block crossing points along the Spanish-French border across the length of the Pyrenees from the Atlantic Ocean to the Mediterranean Sea. Six tractors blocked traffic from the French side.

On May 11, 2026, dozens of French farmers assembled near the Feyzin oil refinery south of Lyon. They demanded a reduction in the price of non-road diesel (GNR), the fuel used in agricultural machinery. The group included members of the Coordination Rurale union and independent producers, and they gathered close to the refinery and its adjacent fuel depot. Describing their protest as a "semi-blockade," they said they aimed to raise awareness of the financial pressure that rising fuel costs have placed on the farming industry.

== “Act II” against the EU-Mercosur treaty (November) ==
In November, the movement started again to dissuade the French government from joining the free trade agreement between the European Union and Mercosur.

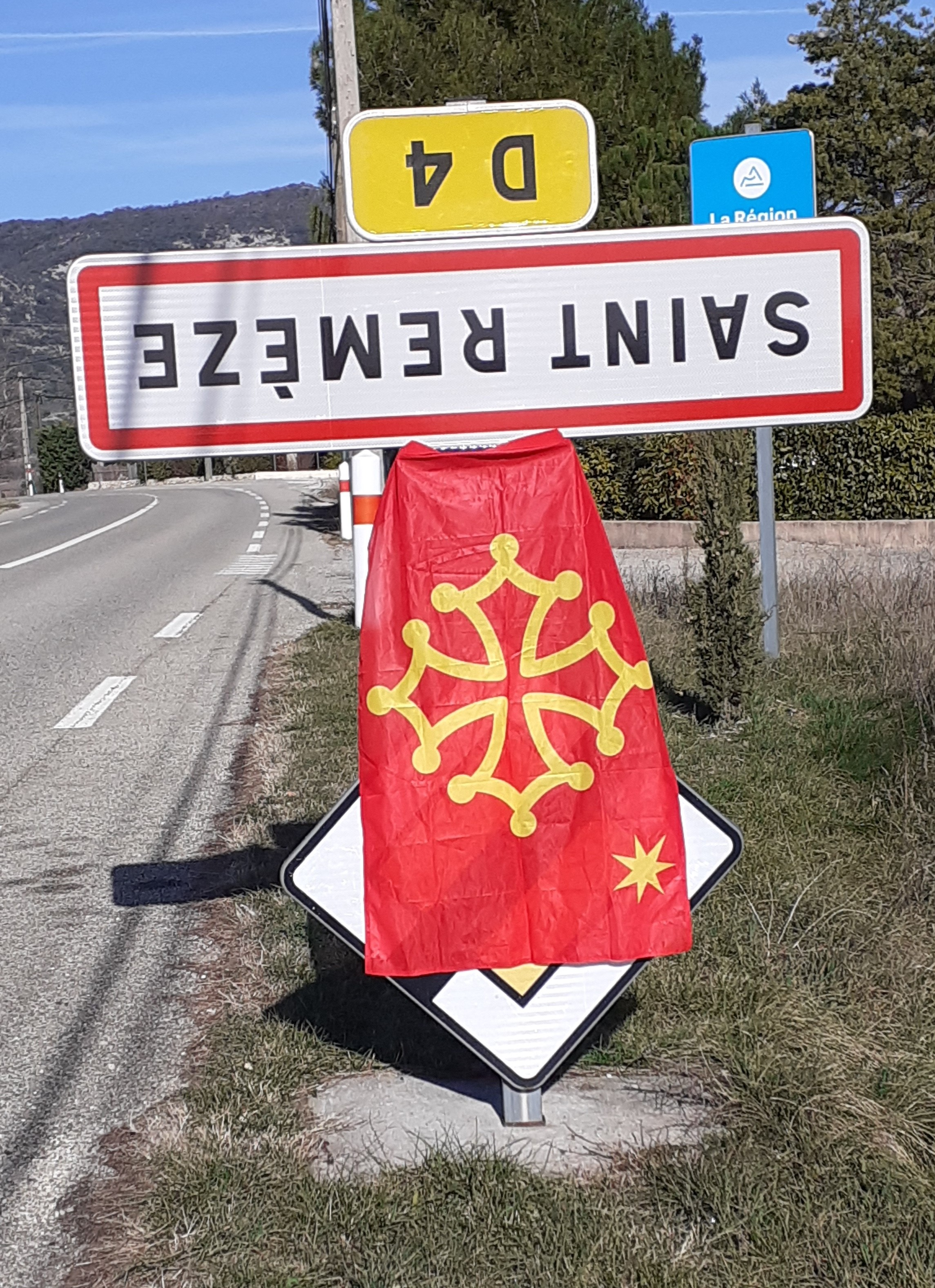
Upside down sign in Ardèche at Saint-Remèze

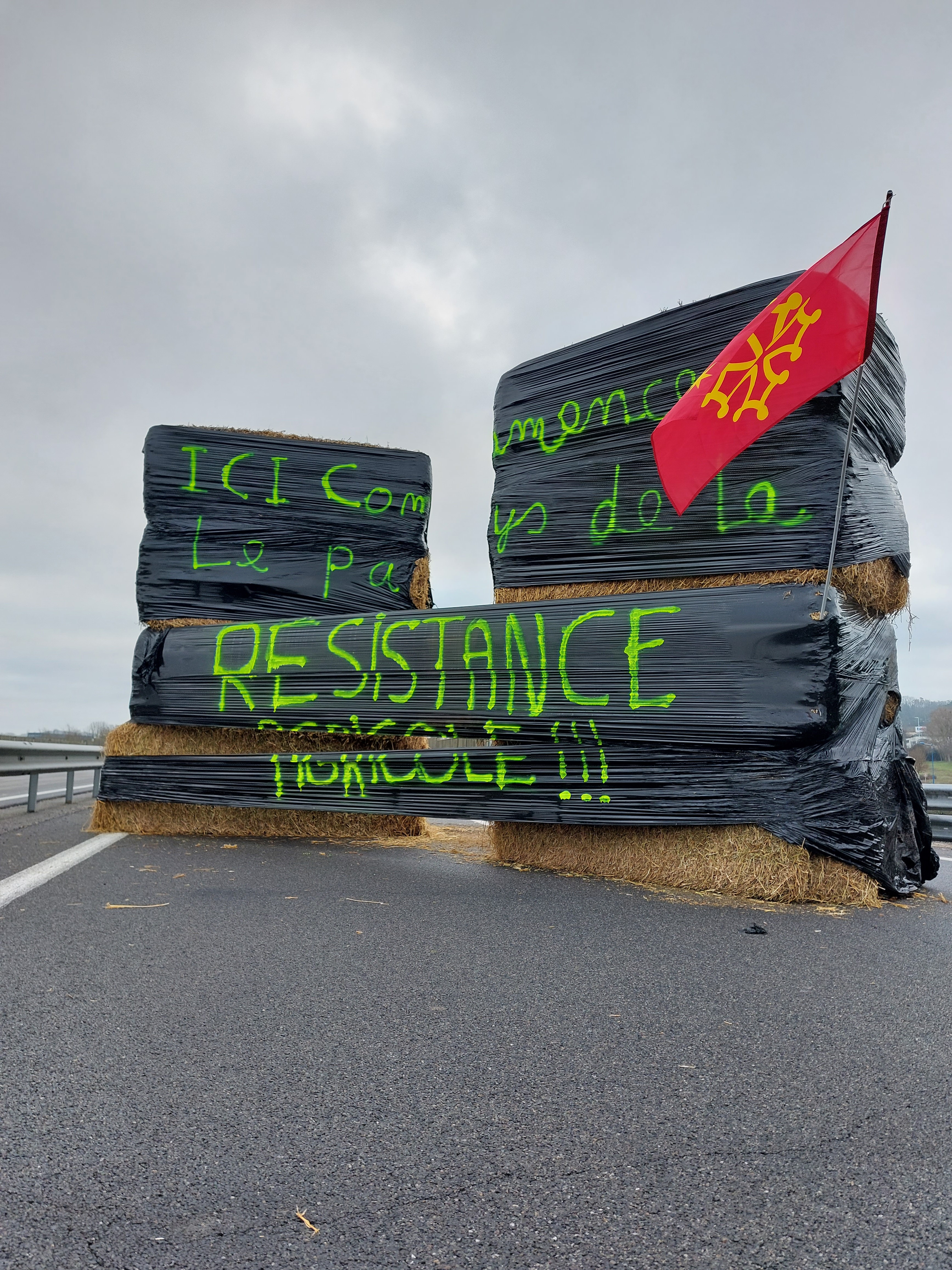
Improvised road blockage in January 2024 by the FNSEA in Occitania at L'Isle-Jourdain

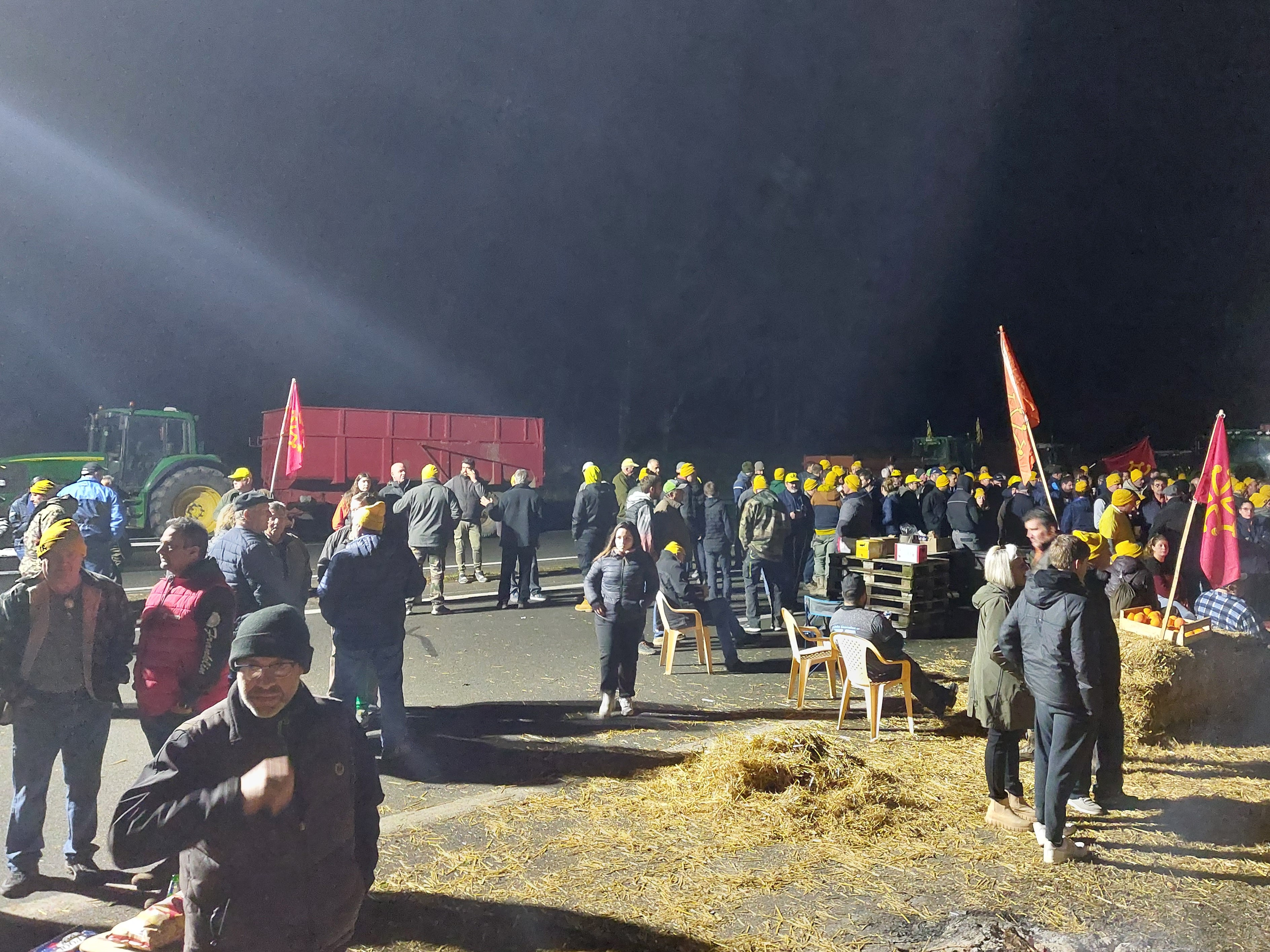
Occitan farmers from the Rural coordination on a road blockage on 24 January 2024.

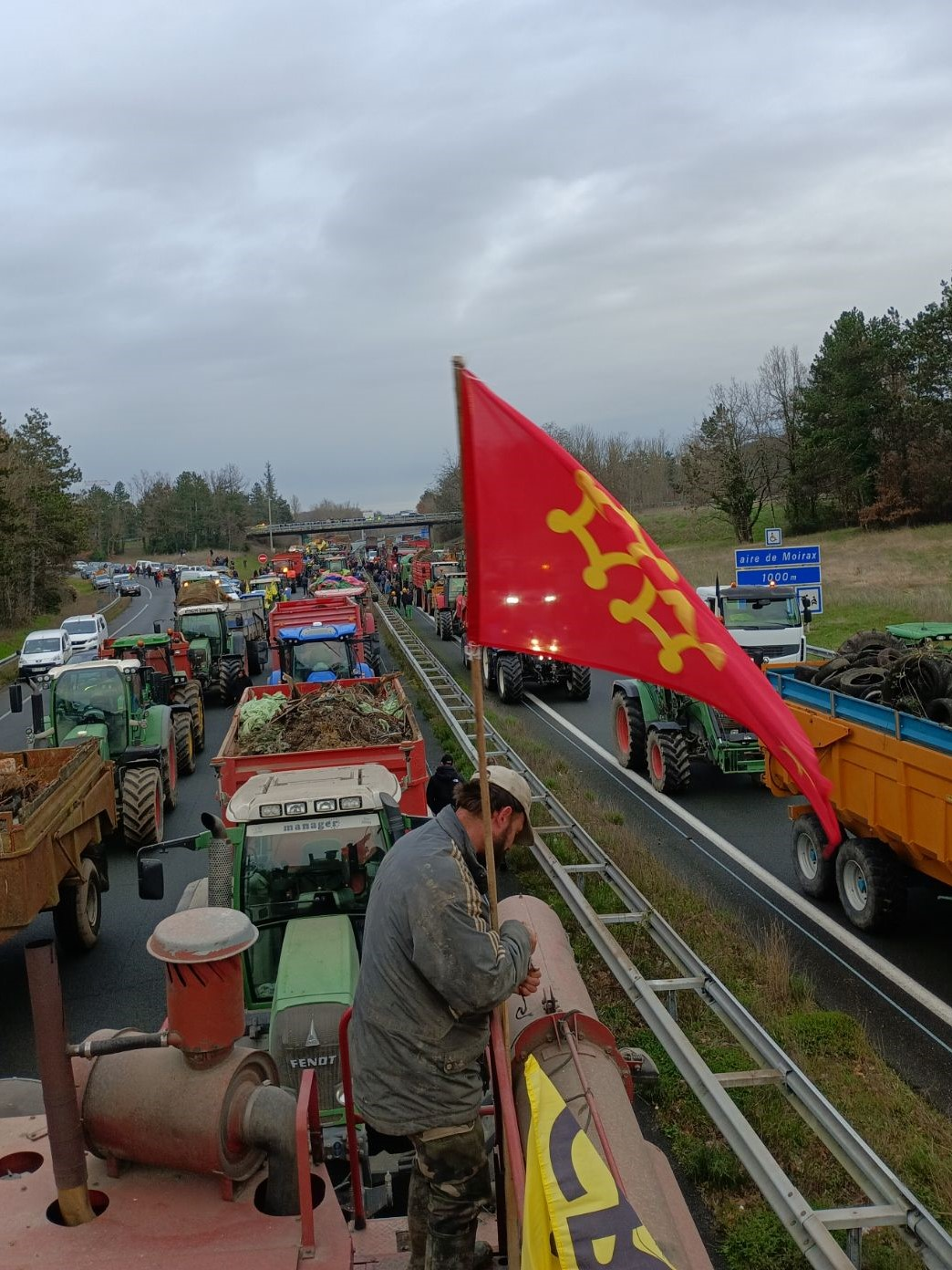
Occitan Farmers on a motorway near Agen on 22 January 2024.

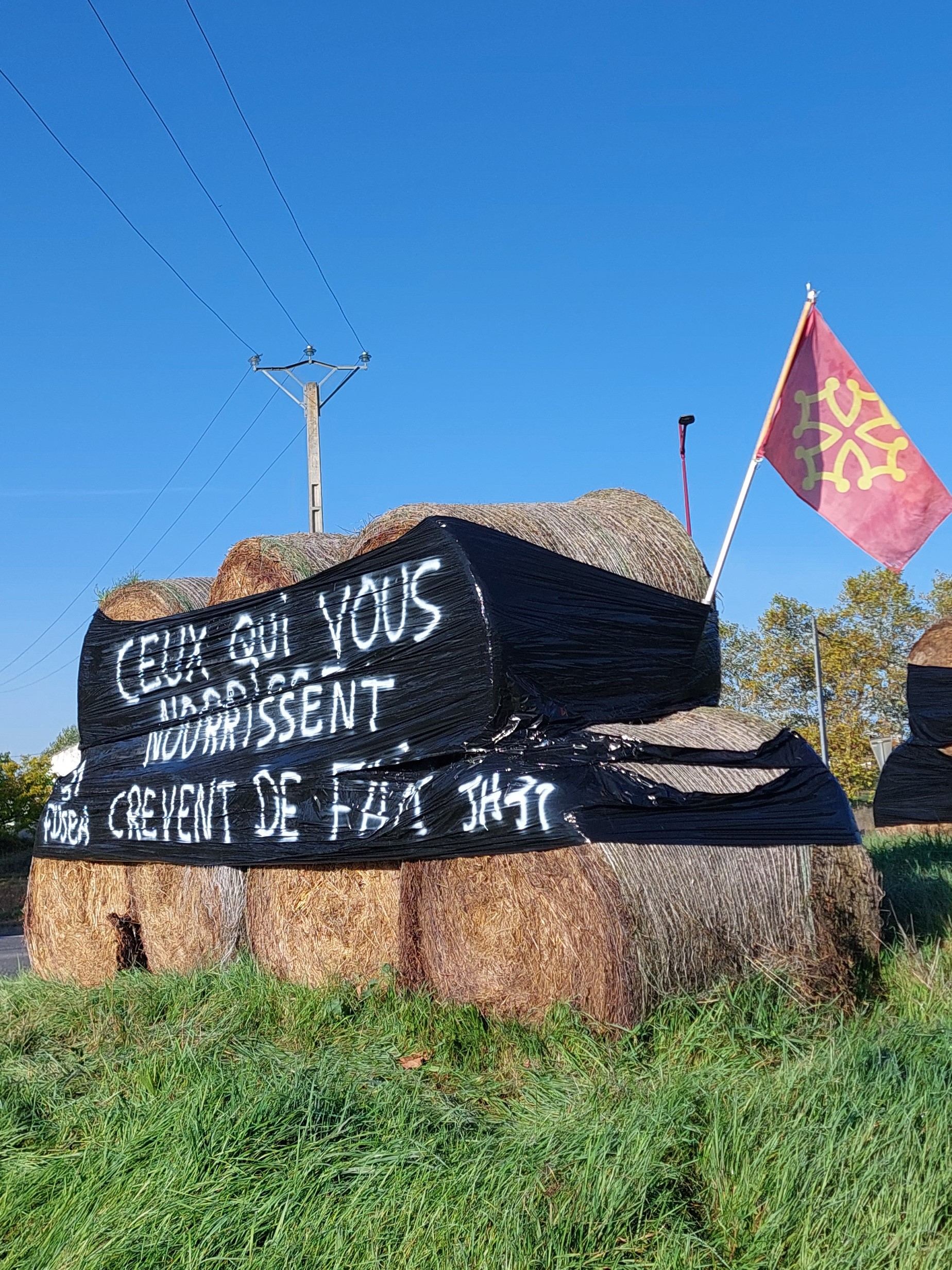
“Act II” against the EU-Mercosur treaty (November).

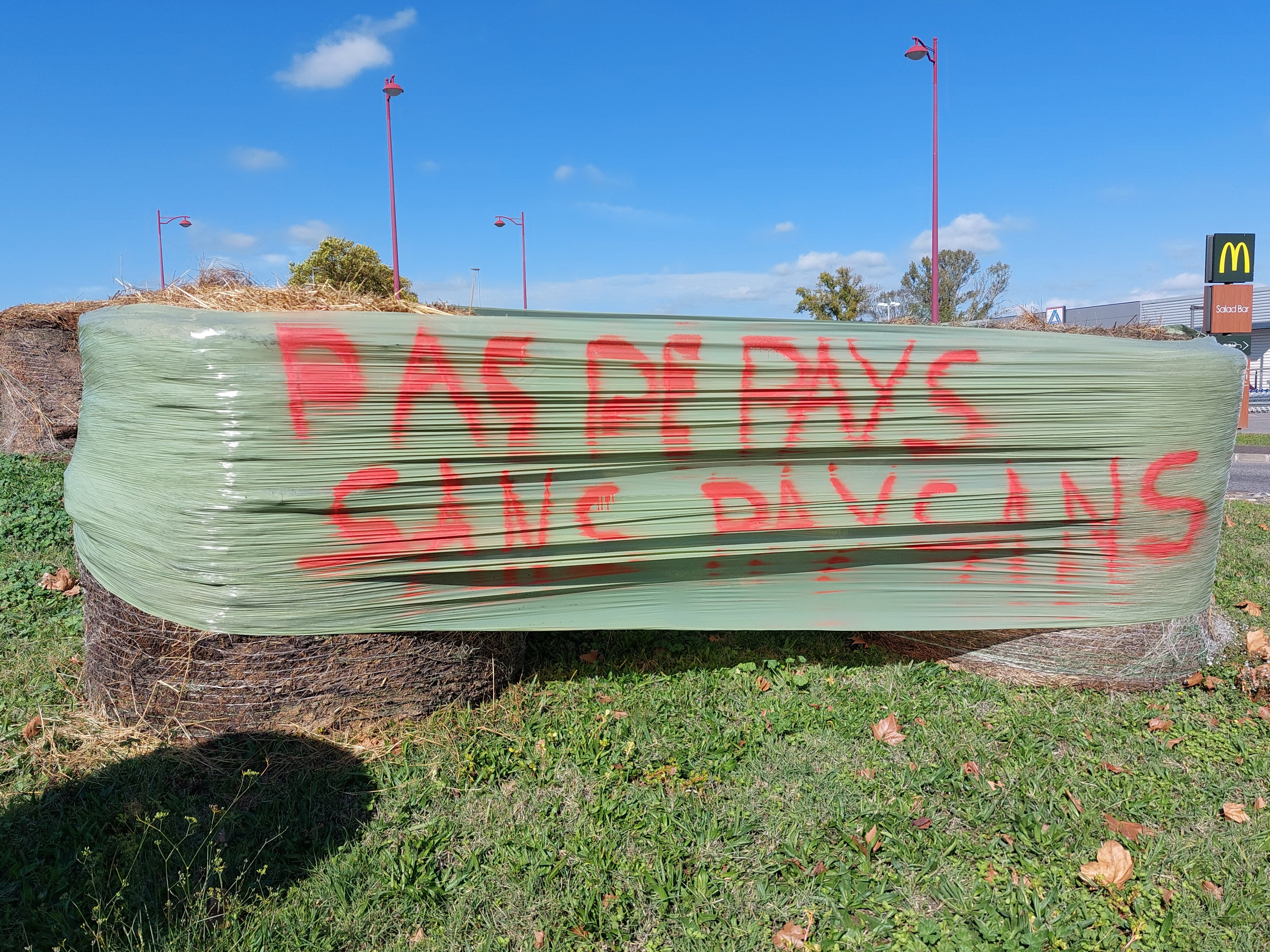
"Pas de pays sans paysans" (No farmers, No country).

== Main demands ==
While the demands were centered around revenue, they varied throughout the movement, depending on who was expressing them, with some demands appearing once unions had taken the leadership of the movement. The main worries of farmers, according to a poll dating from November 2023 were:

1. worries linked to income and the economic context were cited by 53% of respondents (with rising costs, market instability and inadequate sales prices at the top of the list);
2. worries linked to standards, public policies and controls were cited by 35% of respondents (with laws and standards governing practices and controls at the top of the list);
3. worries linked to the climate context and environmental vulnerability came in third, cited by 25% of respondents (with climate change and its consequences at the top of the list);
4. lack of consideration and recognition came in 4th place, cited by 19% of farmers questioned.

At the beginning of the movement, Jérôme Bayle, who initiated it, had three demands:

- better coverage of damage caused by the epizootic haemorrhagic disease;
- cancellation of the tax increase on the diesel used by farmers;
- progress on the issue of water reservoirs.

== Bibliography ==
Divergences and representation in the French farming community: an analysis of the farmers’ movement of 2024, Parlons Climat

== See also ==
- 2023–2024 European Union farmers' protests
