= Agricultural produce market committee =

Board to protect farmers from large retailers in India

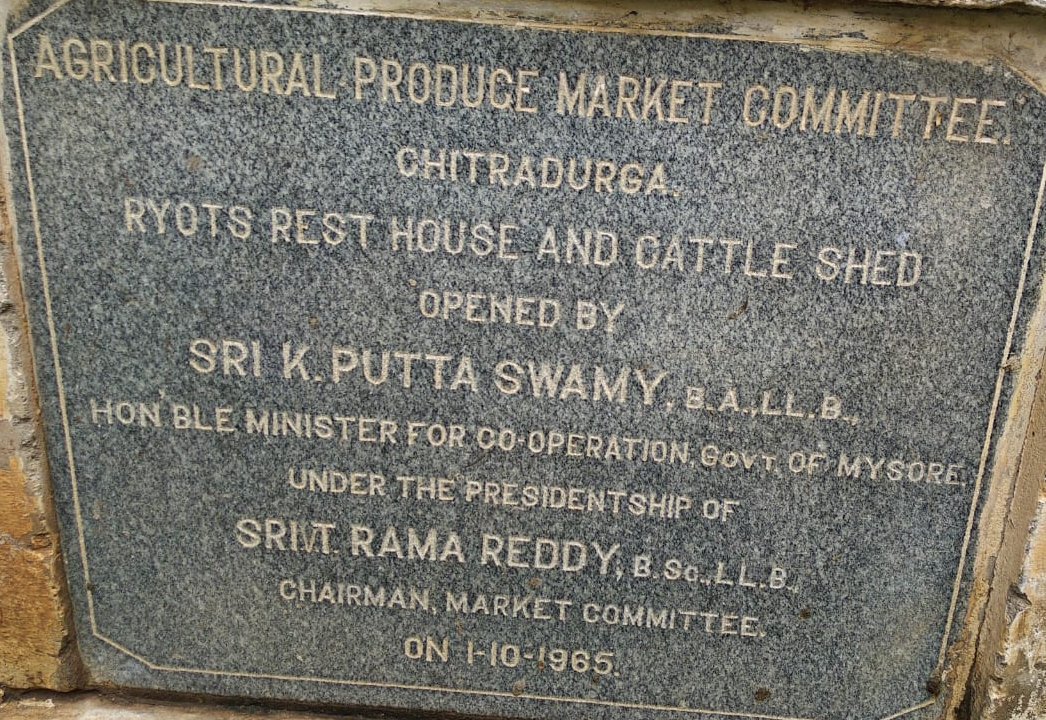
Foundation stone of an APMC laid down in 1965 by K. S. Puttaswamy, erstwhile Minister of Mysore State

An Agricultural Produce Market Committee (APMC) is a marketing board established by state governments in India to ensure farmers are safeguarded from exploitation by large retailers, as well as ensuring the farm to retail price spread does not reach excessively high levels. APMCs are regulated by states through their adoption of an Agriculture Produce Marketing Regulation (APMR) Act.

Prior to independence in 1947, the major concern of government policy related to agricultural marketing was to keep the prices of food for the consumers and agro-raw materials for the industry in check. However, after independence, there came a need to protect the interest of farmers and to provide them incentive prices to augment the production of agricultural commodities. Common throughout the country were problems of local money lenders extorting high amounts of foodgrains from the farmer, at throwaway prices, as interest. Recognizing the defects that farmers faced—such as losses in terms of undue low prices, higher costs of marketing, and considerable physical losses of the produce in the agricultural marketing system—the Indian Government introduced several mandatory regulations in hopes of establishing a mechanism to monitor the market conduct. Regulation and development of primary agricultural produce markets was taken up as an institutional innovation, and construction of well laid out market yards was considered as an essential requirement for regulating the practices in primary wholesale markets.

== History ==
The concept of an agriculture produce market regulation programme in India dates back to the British Raj: raw cotton was the first farm produce to attract the attention of the Government due to the anxiety of British rulers to make available the supplies of pure cotton at reasonable prices to the textile mills of Manchester (UK). Consequently, India's first regulated market (Karanja) was established in 1886 and Risod in 1899 under the Hyderabad Residency Order, with the first legislation being the Berar Cotton and Grain Market Act of 1887, which empowered British residents to declare any place in the assigned district a market for sale and purchase of agricultural produce and constitute a committee to supervise the regulated markets. This Act became the model for enactment in other parts of the country.

An important landmark in the agricultural marketing scene in the country has been the recommendation of the 1928 Royal Commission on Agriculture for regulation of marketing practices and establishment of regulated markets. One of the measures taken to improve the situation was to regulate the trade practices and to establish market yards in the countryside. In pursuance, Government of India prepared a Model Bill in 1938 and circulated it to all states; however, not much headway was made until India's independence.

During the 1960s and 1970s, most of the states enacted and enforced Agricultural Produce Markets Regulation (APMR) Acts. All primary wholesale assembling markets were brought under the ambit of these Acts. Well laid out market yards and sub-yards were constructed and, for each market area, an Agricultural Produce Market Committee (APMC) was constituted to frame the rules and enforce them. Thus, the organized agricultural marketing came into existence through regulated markets.

In 2015, the year's Union Budget proposed to create a United National Agriculture Market with the help of state governments and NITI Ayog.

=== Reforms ===
Reforms have been passed by the Government of India in the form of three acts in 2020:

1. the Farmers' Produce Trade and Commerce (Promotion and Facilitation) Act
2. the Farmers (Empowerment and Protection) Agreement on Price Assurance and Farm Services Act; and
3. the Essential Commodities Amendment Act' under which the monopoly of middlemen in APMCs is sought to be abolished and move towards creation of a free market. While cartelization has been a big problem in APMCs, these bills have been criticized by the farmers themselves because of the fear that these laws will lead to degradation of APMCs and eventually Minimum Support Price will be diluted.

This has led to protests by farmers in India specially Punjab, Haryana and west parts of Uttar Pradesh and the laws were subsequently repealed in 2021.

== Overview ==
APMCs operate on two principles:

1. Ensure that farmers are not exploited by intermediaries (or money lenders) who compel farmers to sell their produce at the farm gate for an extremely low price.
2. All food produce should first be brought to a market yard and then sold through auction.

Each state that operates APMC markets (mandis) establish their markets in different places within their borders, geographically dividing the state. Farmers are required to sell their produce via auction at the mandi in their region. Traders require a license to operate within a mandi. Wholesale and retail traders (e.g. shopping mall owners) and food processing companies cannot buy produce directly from a farmer.

=== APMC Model Act, 2003 ===
Some of the salient features of the APMC Model Act 2003 include:

1. Facilitating contract farming model.
2. Special market for perishables
3. Allowing farmers and private persons to set up their own market.
4. Relaxation of licensing norms.
5. Single market fee
6. APMC revenue to be used for improving market infrastructure.

However, not all states have passed the bill. Some states have passed but neither framed rules nor notified it. Thus, inter-state barriers continue.

== APMC by state ==
=== Madhya Pradesh ===
The Government of Madhya Pradesh has taken several initiatives so that farmers may get a better price for their produce.

=== Karnataka ===
The Government of Karnataka has created APMCs in many towns to enable farmers to sell their produce at reasonable prices. Most APMCs have a market where traders and other marketing agents are provided stalls or godowns or shops to purchase agricultural produce from farmers. Farmers can sell their produce to agents or traders under the supervision of the APMC. There are approximately one hundred sixty two (162) Agricultural Produce Market Committee (APMC) regulated markets all across Karnataka state. The APMC market yard have basic amenities like refreshment room/stall, toilet, drinking water supply. Some of the bigger APMC markets have bank branch, post office, cold storage facilities.Bengaluru's APMC regulated market at Yeshawanthpur is one of the largest APMC market in South India.

Prior to 2020, farmers could not sell produce outside the APMC mechanism. The APMC system made farmers vulnerable to traders' and marketing agents' price manipulations. The Government of India has considered improving the APMC Act to benefit all parties involved.

In 2020, the Government of Karnataka passed The Karnataka Agricultural Produce Marketing (Regulation and Development) (Amendment) Bill, 2020, which enables farmers to trade their produce anywhere without the intervention of APMCs. It also allowed Food processing companies to buy produce directly from farmers.

=== Maharashtra ===
The Maharashtra State Agricultural Marketing Board (MSAMB) runs 295 APMCs in Maharashtra, under the APMC Act enacted by the Government of India. In July 2016, the Maharashtra Government removed fruits and vegetables from the purview of the APMCs, urging farmers to directly bring their produce for sale in Mumbai. The government has granted 148 Direct Marketing Licenses, of which 91 are for fruits and vegetables. The APMC in Pune, meanwhile, appealed to the farmers from the state as well as from outside to bring their produce to the market and sell those directly. In the city of Navi Mumbai, the APMC Market is located in Vashi/Turbhe nodes.

=== Tamil Nadu ===
In Tamil Nadu, the Tamil Nadu State Agricultural Marketing Board, successfully running since 1977, is the regulatory board for agricultural markets. 21 market committees are established for every notified area, and 277 regulated markets are functioning under these committees for better regulation of buying and selling of agricultural produce.

=== Andhra Pradesh ===
The Andhra Pradesh (Agricultural Produce and Livestock) Markets Act Government Order was passed in Andhra Pradesh in 1966, and amended in 1969.

== See also ==
- National Agricultural Cooperative Marketing Federation of India
- E-NAM
