= Acrocercops gossypii =

Scientific classification
- Kingdom: Animalia
- Phylum: Arthropoda
- Class: Insecta
- Order: Lepidoptera
- Family: Gracillariidae
- Genus: Acrocercops
- Species: A. gossypii

Binomial name
- Acrocercops gossypii Vári, 1961

Species of moth

Acrocercops gossypii is a moth of the family Gracillariidae. It is known from South Africa.

The larvae feed on Gossypium herbaceum and Gossypium hirsutum. They mine the leaves of their host plant.
