= V. P. Sanu =

Indian politician (born 1988)

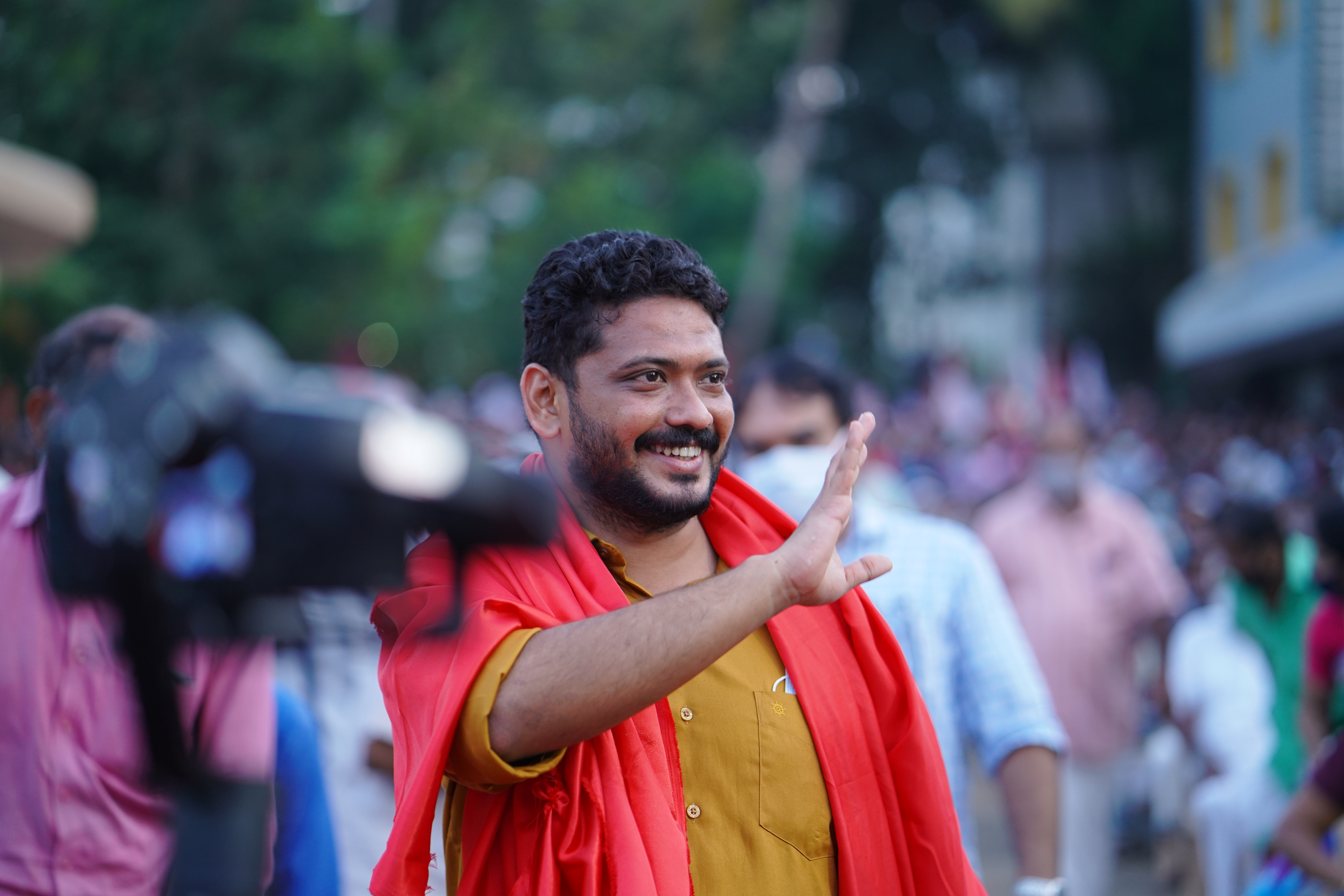

President of the Students' Federation of India
- Incumbent
- Assumed office 25 January 2016
- Preceded by: V. Sivadasan
- General Secretary: Mayukh Biswas (2018-till date)

Personal details
- Born: 31 October 1988 (age 37) Valanchery, Kerala, India
- Party: Communist Party of India (Marxist)
- Education: • MES Keveeyam College, Valanchery • Sree Sankaracharya University of Sanskrit

V. P. Sanu (born 31 October 1988) is an Indian politician who is currently the President of Kerala's Sports Council. He was former National President of the Students' Federation of India, the students' wing of the Communist Party of India (Marxist). He is also a member of the Kerala state committee of the CPI(M). He contested the parliamentary election in 2019 polls and 2021 by-polls representing CPI(M) in Malappuram, Kerala against IUML and lost both times.

== Political career ==
=== Student activist ===
Sanu started his political life by organising SFI at GHSS Kuttippuram. He was active in Balasangam and later became the district secretary of the organisation at Malappuram. He has held the responsibilities of Area Secretary of Students' Federation of India at Valancherry, President and Secretary of Malappuram District Committee, President of the Kerala State Committee of Students' Federation of India. The 15th All India Conference of Students' Federation of India at Sikar, Rajasthan elected him as the National President of SFI. He was re-elected as the National President at the 16th All India Conference of Students' Federation of India held at Shimla, Himachal Pradesh in 2018 and 17th All India Conference held at Hyderabad in 2022.

During his term as the National President of SFI the organisation has witnessed remarkable growth in southern and northern states of India. He played a key role in organising rallies against Narendra Modi on 15 March 2016 at New Delhi demanding improved budget allocation for education, health and employment generation. He has led movements demanding justice for Rohit Vemula and Najeeb Ahamed at national capital. He became a strong voice against the "13-point roster system" and scuttling off reservation in universities during faculty recruitment. Sanu gave a call for boycotting Hewlett Packard (HP) protesting against the Israel's violation of human rights in Palestine. Sanu was a delegate to World Festival of Youth and Students held at Sochi, Russia on 14 to 22 August 2017.

Sanu has led a massive national jatha starting from Kanyakumari and passing through 22 states of India from 4 to 17 September 2018. The jatha was directed against the anti-student policies of Narendra Modi and raised the slogan of "Scientific and Quality Education Without Discrimination". He has taken part in rallies against Mamata Banerjee in Kolkata. On 18 February 2019, under the leadership of Sanu, students' federation of India and several left organisations marched to parliament demanding the 10 percentage of central government budget allocation for education and the implementation of Bhagat Singh National Employment Guarantee scheme.

He openly declared support for Women in Cinema Collective and criticised Association of Malayalam Movie Artistes (AMMA) for their decision to take back actor Dileep, who was accused in abduction and sexual harassment of an actress in Kerala. He asked to reconsider decisions to call film actors affiliated to AMMA for SFI programmes. Sanu has taken strong position against moral policing. He has played a major leadership role in more than hundred days of student protests at Calicut university against the then vice chancellor Abdul Salaam and has led marches demanding the implementation of charter of demands. He arranged the screening of The Unbearable Being of Lightness, March March March and In the Shade of Fallen Chinar in campuses across India. These were the short films banned by Central Government at the International Documentary and Short Film festival of 2016. He disbanded the SFI unit in Trivandrum after its members entered into serious clashes.

His tenure along with Mayukh Biswas as national leadership of Students Federation of India articulated resistance to National Education Policy 2019. The dimensions of exclusion, centralization and commercialisation was considered as the major problems of NEP-2019. Ever since the draft of NEP got published, India has seen nationwide protest action against the educational policies of Narendra Modi Government. SFI found NEP as an instrument by the central government for a) undermining independent research b) destroying the federal character of education system and c) deepening commercialisation and privatisation of education. He slammed central government for violating the federal spirit in implementing educational reforms. He raised concerns with University Grants Commission for extending online education as a routine activity and highlighted the infrastructural and socio-economic bottleneck faced in the higher education sector. He said online education will act as a glass ceiling for first-generation learners. He was also in the fore front demanding proper investigation and punishment of stupidities for the institutional murder of Fathima Lathif, a student of IIT Madras.

Under his leadership, Students Federation of India took out a parliament march against Citizenship Amendment Act 2019. He said "CAA is not only directed against Muslims but against the working class in general, indigenous people, and backward communities." He pointed out that the core values of Indian Constitution is attacked by Modi government. SFI approached the Supreme Court of India demanding the repeal of CAA - 2019 and took account parliament march against it. He did a 13 km long protest rally from Panangangara to Malappuram against Amit Shah's statement that CAA will be implemented in Kerala after 2021 polls. The rally was attacked by Muslim League activists at Makkaraparamba, Malappuram. Sanu was earlier assaulted by Muslim Students Federation while attending a farmers solidarity meeting at Malappuram.

During the COVID-19 pandemic, In first of an attempt in India, he handed over WISK (Walk-in Sample Kiosk) developed by SFI activists to Government hospital, Tirur. SFI also initiated TV Challenge to help marginalised students learn during the pandemic. He said the campaign was aimed to bridge the digital divide in Kerala. He strongly criticized the Draft Lakshadweep Panchayat Regulation, 2021 and said that "this bizarre formulation should give a hint about the heights of Praful Patel's mal-administration." In December 2021, Sanu criticized the Kerala Governor Arif Muhammed Khan for being a puppet controlled by RSS and asked him to be relieved from the post of Chancellor of the universities in Kerala if he wishes. On the Hijab ban in Karnataka's educational institution Sanu commented that "Hijab is cited as reason to deny Muslim women's right to education."

=== Controversies ===
Sanu entered a major controversy for his critique of Indian Judiciary. He criticized Kerala High Court Judge Justice Devan Ramachandran for working in submission to the Modi led union government. He finds both Justice Devan Ramachandran and Kerala Governor Arif Mohammed Khan as sharing similar perspectives on matters regarding Kerala state. He also said whether this is to receive laurels or positions will only be apparent once Justice Ramachandran retires. However, a lawyer moved to court against this remark for suo moto contempt case.

=== Party Politics ===
In 2022, V P Sanu got elected to the Kerala state committee of CPI(M). He was earlier part of the Malappuram district committee of the party.

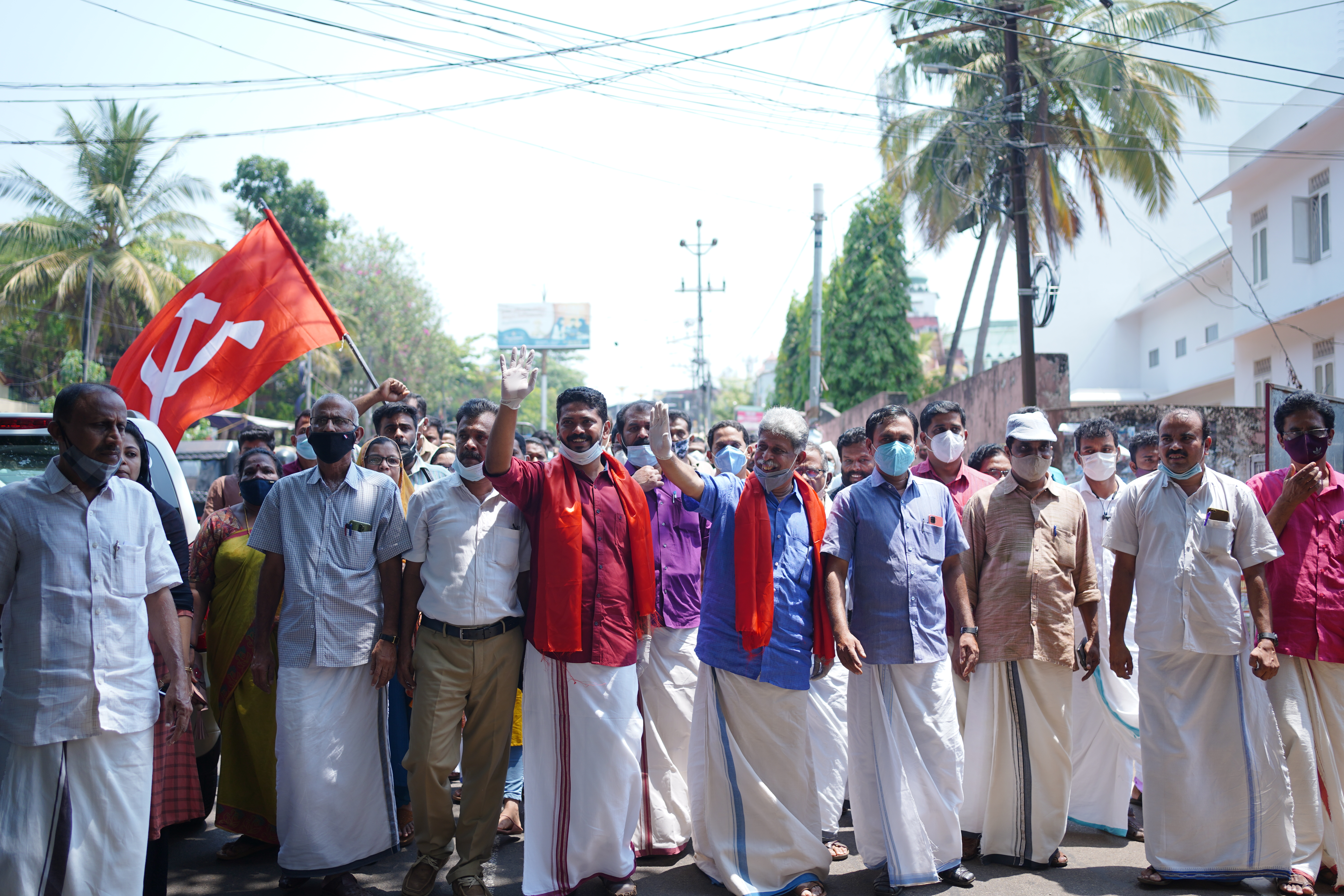
VP Sanu during his nomination rally for 2021 bye-polls at Malappuram.

==== 2019 Malappuram Lok Sabha Election ====
The Left Democratic Front in Kerala has fielded him as the candidate at Malappuram parliamentary constituency for the 2019 Lok Sabha election. He received international solidarity for his candidature. Student and youth activists from Canada, Turkey and Bolivia issued statements appealing the voters of Malappuram. Sanu contested against P. K. Kunhalikutty of IUML. In the legislative assembly election of 1991, Sanu's father V. P. Sakkariya also has contested against P. K. Kunhalikutty as a CPI(M) candidate.

==== 2021 Malappuram Lok Sabha Bye-Election ====
V P Sanu is the LDF Candidate in 2021 Malappuram (Lok Sabha constituency) bye-polls. The security deposit for his elections were donated by farmer leaders from Punjab and Bihar, who are leading the ongoing farmers' protest in the country against the Farmers' Produce Trade and Commerce (Promotion and Facilitation) Bill, 2020, the Farmers (Empowerment and Protection) Agreement of Price Assurance and Farm Services Bill, 2020 and the Essential Commodities (Amendment) Bill, 2020. He criticised the IUML leader P.K Kunhalikutty for the poor parliamentary performance and the notable absence during the Triple Talaq bill voting and the Vice President election.

Sanu lost the election to M.P. Abdussamad Samadani. However, he recorded CPI(M)'s best performance in the IUML strong hold. He reduced the margin of IUML from 2,60,153 votes to 1,14,615 votes, a dip of 1.5 lakh votes.

== Articles ==
1) A Battle for India's Soul. Jacobin. 3.1.2020

2) Politics Behind the Call for Ending Autonomy of Kerala State. Newsclick. 27.6.2023

== See also ==
- List of Left Democratic Front candidates for Indian general election, 2019 in Kerala
