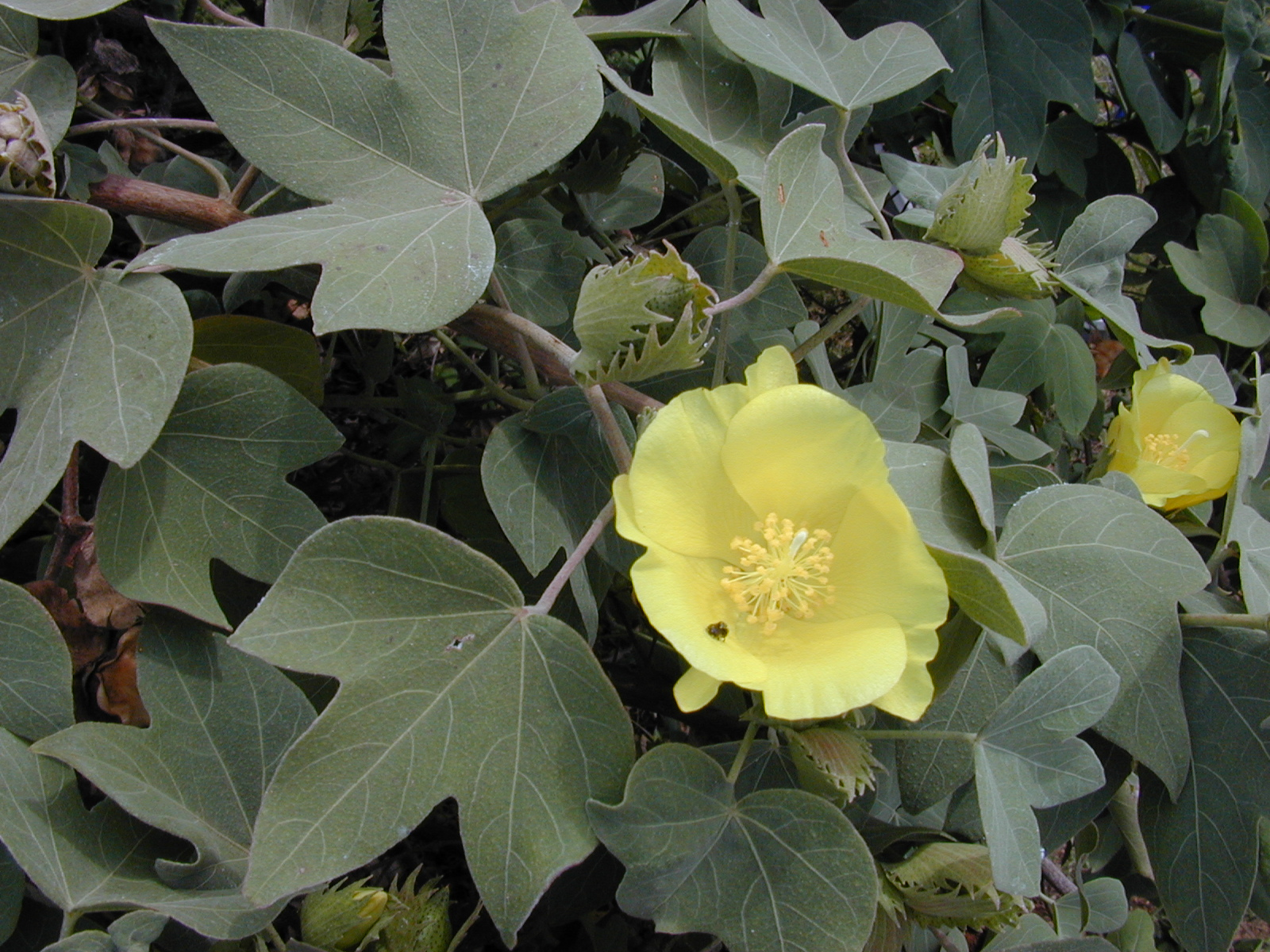

Conservation status
- Vulnerable (IUCN 3.1)

- Imperiled (NatureServe)

Scientific classification
- Kingdom: Plantae
- Clade: Tracheophytes
- Clade: Angiosperms
- Clade: Eudicots
- Clade: Rosids
- Order: Malvales
- Family: Malvaceae
- Genus: Gossypium
- Subgenus: G. subg. Karpas
- Species: G. tomentosum

Binomial name
- Gossypium tomentosum Nutt. ex Seem.

= Gossypium tomentosum =

Species of flowering plant in the mallow family

Gossypium tomentosum, commonly known as maʻo, huluhulu or Hawaiian cotton, is a species of cotton plant that is endemic to the Hawaiian Islands. Genetic studies indicate that Hawaiian cotton is related to American species of Gossypium, with its closest relative Gossypium hirsutum.

== Description ==
Maʻo is a shrub that reaches a height of 1.5–5 ft (0.46–1.52 m) and a diameter of 5–10 ft (1.5–3.0 m). The seed hairs (lint) are short and reddish brown, unsuitable for spinning or twisting into thread. Its flowers are bright yellow and have from 3-5 lobes that bloom in late summer to winter.

== Distribution ==
Its ancestor may have come to the islands from the Americas as a seed on the wind or in the droppings of a bird, or as part of floating debris.

== Habitat ==
It inhabits low shrublands at elevations from sea level to 120 m (390 ft). They can be found on all main Hawaiian islands besides Hawai'i, otherwise known as the Big Island.

== Modern use ==
Gossypium tomentosum has been bred with other cotton plants to try and get a more persistent cotton plant for. Maʻo has also been studied with the interest in greater pollination consistency. Additionally, Maʻo has been used to breed with other cotton plants to try to build up more resilience to salt. The salinity of its habitat is high due to its close proximity to the ocean and thus has a resistance to salt more than other species.

== Cultural significance ==
Native Hawaiians use maʻo flowers to make a yellow dye. They were also used to aid childbirth and mitigate stomach aches.

== Conservation status ==
Gossypium tomentosum is under the G2 status and is considered at risk of extinction due to its lack of reach around the world. This conservation status comes from the NatureServe definitions on different elements that affect species diversity.
