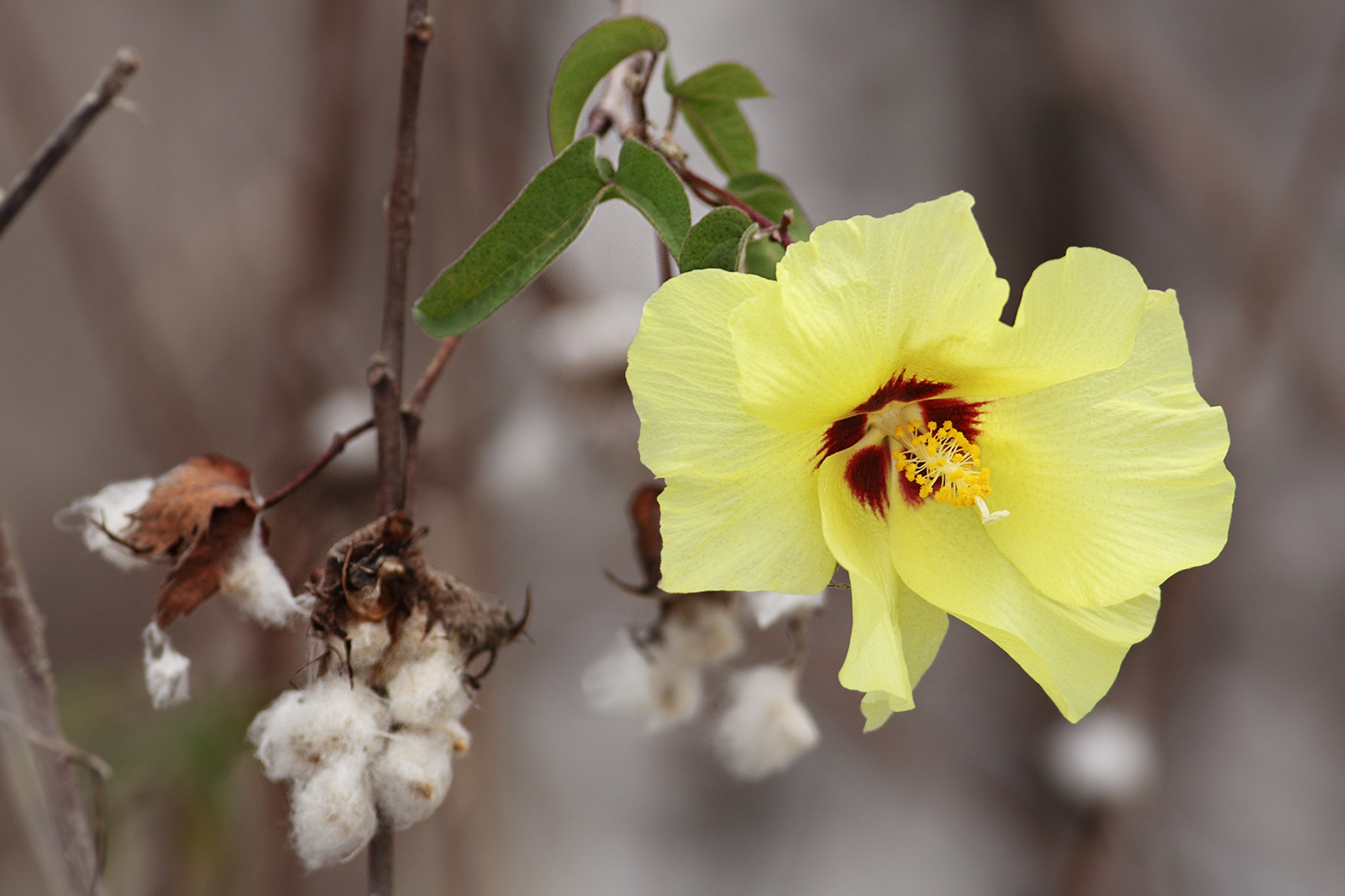

Conservation status
- Least Concern (IUCN 3.1)

Scientific classification
- Kingdom: Plantae
- Clade: Embryophytes
- Clade: Tracheophytes
- Clade: Angiosperms
- Clade: Eudicots
- Clade: Rosids
- Order: Malvales
- Family: Malvaceae
- Genus: Gossypium
- Species: G. darwinii

Binomial name
- Gossypium darwinii G.Watt

= Gossypium darwinii =

Darwin's cotton

Species of flowering plant in the mallow family

Gossypium darwinii, or Darwin's cotton, is a species of cotton plant which is found only on the Galapagos Islands. Genetic studies indicate that it is most closely related to the native American species Gossypium barbadense, thus it is surmised that a seed arrived from South America on the wind, in the droppings of a bird or associated with debris by sea.
