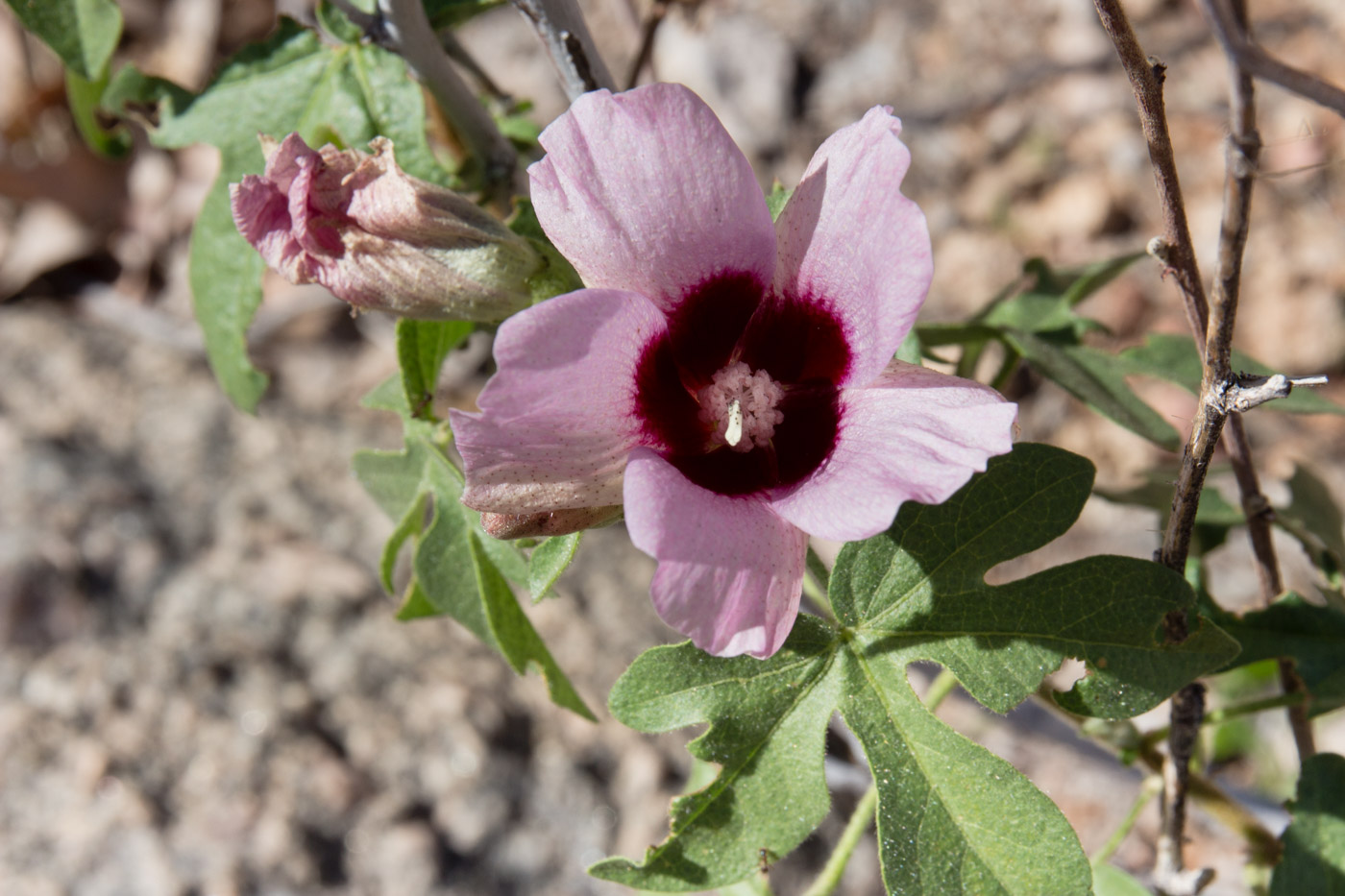
- In Angola

Conservation status
- Near Threatened (IUCN 3.1)

Scientific classification
- Kingdom: Plantae
- Clade: Tracheophytes
- Clade: Angiosperms
- Clade: Eudicots
- Clade: Rosids
- Order: Malvales
- Family: Malvaceae
- Genus: Gossypium
- Species: G. anomalum

Binomial name
- Gossypium anomalum Wawra & Peyr.

Synonyms
- List: Cienfuegosia anomala (Wawra & Peyr.) Gilg; Cienfuegosia pentaphylla K.Schum.; Gossypium barbosanum L.Ll.Phillips & Clement; Gossypium capitis-viridis Mauer; Hibiscus anomalus (Wawra & Peyr.) Kuntze

= Gossypium anomalum =

Species of plant in the mallow family

Gossypium anomalum is a species of wild cotton in the family Malvaceae, native to drier parts of Africa. A crop wild relative of cultivated cotton, its genome has been sequenced.

== Subtaxa ==
The following subspecies are accepted:

- Gossypium anomalum subsp. anomalum – Cape Verde, Mauritania, Mali, Burkina Faso, Niger, Cameroon, Chad, Sudan, Eritrea, Somalia
- Gossypium anomalum subsp. senarense (Fenzl ex Wawra & Peyr.) Vollesen – Angola, Namibia
