= Cotton production in Pakistan =

Cotton production in Pakistan is integral to the economic development of the country. The nation is largely dependent on the cotton industry and its related textile sector, and the crop has been given a principal status in the country. Cotton is grown as an industrial crop in 15% of the nation's land during the monsoon months of April–May, known as the Kharif period, and is grown at a smaller scale between February and April. Pakistan occupied the fourth position among the cotton growers of the world, the first three being India, China and USA.

== History ==
The earliest known historical traces of cotton was found at Mehrgarh near the city of Quetta, making Pakistan one of the first regions of cotton cultivation. Cotton was discovered in threads on a copper bead at a burial site dated to the Neolithic period (6000 BC). The mineralised threads were subject to metallurgical analysis with a combination of a reflected-light microscope and a scanning electron microscope, revealing that they were of cotton (genus Gossypium). Cotton cultivation became more widespread during the Indus Valley civilisation, which covered parts of present-day eastern Pakistan and northwestern India. Archaeobotanical evidence of seeds has been traced to 5000 BC in Mehrgarh, though it is not clear if they belonged to a wild or cultivated variety. Use of cotton cloth in the Indus Valley cities of Mohenjo-daro and Harappa dates to 2,500 BC. Cotton pollen has been recorded at Balakot. At Harappa (Mature Harappan period 2500-2000 BC), evidence of cotton threads has been found tied to the handle of a mirror, an antiquity from a female burial site, and around a copper razor. There is also much other evidence of cotton in some form, such as Malavaceae (flowering plant) pollen type, similar to Gossypium in Balakot (Mature Harappan period, 2500–2000 BC); as seeds at Banawali (Mature Harappan, 2200–1900 BC), Sanghol (Late Harappan, 1900–1400 BC), Kanmer, Kacchh (Late Harappan, 2,000–1,700 BC), Imlidhi Khurd and Gorakhpur (1300–800 BC); as fibres in Late Ochre-Coloured Pottery at Sringaverapura (1200–700 BC); and in Hallur as seeds and fragments of the Early Iron Age (950–900 BC).

== Growing regions ==
Cotton is purely a cellulose fiber crop, one of the four major crops in the country, and is known by popular epithets as "King Cotton" and "white gold". It forms the primary input for the textile industry of Pakistan.

Cotton is integral to Pakistan's economy. According to an analysis in the USDA Foreign Agricultural Service report of 2015, it is grown as an industrial crop in 15% of the nation's land. It is grown during the monsoon months of May to August, known as the kharif period. It is also grown on a smaller scale between February and April.

Cotton is grown mostly in the two provinces of Punjab and Sindh, with the former accounting for 79% and the latter for 20% of the nation's cotton-growing land. It is also grown in Khyber Pakhtunkhwa (KPK) and Balochistan provinces. The total land area of cotton cultivation was reported as 2,950,000 hectares (7,300,000 acres) during the 2014–15 growing season. Generally, small farmers with landholdings less than 5 hectares (12 acres) in size form the largest group of growers; farmers holding less than 2 hectares (4.9 acres) account for 50% of the farms. Landholdings with 25 hectares (62 acres) under cotton cultivation from less than 2% of farms. According to a 2013 estimate, there were 1.6 million farmers (out of a total of 5 million in all sectors) engaged in cotton farming, growing more than 3 million hectares.

== Varieties ==
Farmers have widely adopted Bacillus thuringiensis (Bt) cotton since its first trial in Sindh province in 2002. It is now used in 95% of the area. The Punjab Seed Council has approved the use of 18 Bt cotton and non-Bt varieties for cultivation. These are: 12 BT varieties FH-114, CIM-598, SITARA-009, A-one, BH-167, MIAD-852, CIM-573, SLH-317, TARZAN-1, NS-141, IR-NIBGE-3, MNH-886, and six non-BT varieties NIBGE −115, FH-941, FH-942, IR-1524, Ali Akbar-802 and NEELAM-121. In Sindh province, local Sindh varieties of cotton are also grown in about 40% of the area. They are generally planted from April to July, and harvested during August–December.

== Production ==
Cotton serves as the base for the nation's industrial sector. Production of cotton was reported at a record high of 15 million bales of 470 lbs each in the form of phutti (seed cotton) during 2014–15; this was an 11% increase compared to the previous season (2013–14). Its phenomenal growth was from 1.38 million bales in 1961 to 11.138 million bales in 2014, with the estimated 2014–15 figures showing a further increase to 15 million bales. Between 1980–81 and 1990–91, the growth in production was rapid, with production rising from 0.70 million to 2.2 million tonnes, which was called the "magic year" of Pakistan's cotton industry. This was attributed to better pest control measures, the use of improved seed types, and increased use of fertilizers. The cotton and textile industries are integrated and account for 1,000 ginneries, 425 textile mills, and 300 cottonseed crushers and oil refiners. Cotton hybrids, created by crossing the Bt gene into traditional varieties, have been developed by local firms dealing with seeds. In Sindh province cotton is grown in more than one million acres in the districts of Benazirabad, Hyderabad, Jamshoro, Mirpur Khas, Naushero Feroz, Sanghar, Badin, Sukkar, Ghotki, Tharparkar, Thatta, and Umar Kot.

In terms of production, Pakistan is at the fourth position among the cotton growers of the world; the first three are China, India and the United States, in that order Raw cotton exported from Pakistan holds third position in the world as per records of 2012–13. Consumption-wise it holds the fourth position (about 30 and 40 per cent of its production). It is the largest exporter of cotton yarn.

Cotton produced within the country is of the medium staple. Hence long-staple cotton is imported to produce quality fabrics for export. Medium staple cotton, also called standard medium-staple cotton is American Upland type with staple length varying from about 1.3–3.3 centimetres (0.51–1.30 in). Long-staple kinds of cotton have relatively longer fiber, are expensive, and used mostly to make fine fabrics, yarns, and hosiery. The country's economic development is largely dependent on the cotton industry and its related textile sector, and this has given a principal status to cotton in the country. Apart from use in textiles in the form of cotton lint, yarn, thread, cloth, and garments, its seeds are used for oil extraction.

== Diseases ==
Viruses and pests affect the yield of Bt cotton varieties. Cotton leaf curl virus, which is a plant pathogenic virus of the family Geminiviridae, stunts plant growth seriously affecting yield. Pests like White Fly, Mealy Bugs, Aphids, Pink Boll Worm infect the plants reducing yield.

== Exports ==
474,091 bales of 470 lbs each were exported during the 2014–15 season, an increase from 382,006 bales in 2014–15. The cotton and textile industries play a dominant role in exports; cotton accounts for 55 percent of the country's export earnings, and Pakistan has a 14% share of the world's cloth exports. The European Union (EU) granted Generalized System of Preferences "Plus" status to Pakistan in 2013, which has promoted textile exports to the EU.

== Legal framework ==
Though a bio-safety regulatory system was part of the 18th Amendment to the Constitution of Pakistan that "devolved" several functions to the provinces, the system is still unclear with regard to regulators who can oversee the approval of new seed technologies. In this context, the three regulatory acts which are under approval stage are the Plant Breeders’ Rights Act, Amendments to the 1976 Seed Act, and the Biosafety Law. According to the USDA Foreign Agricultural Service report of 2015, the passage of these laws is crucial to the introduction of new biotech events.
