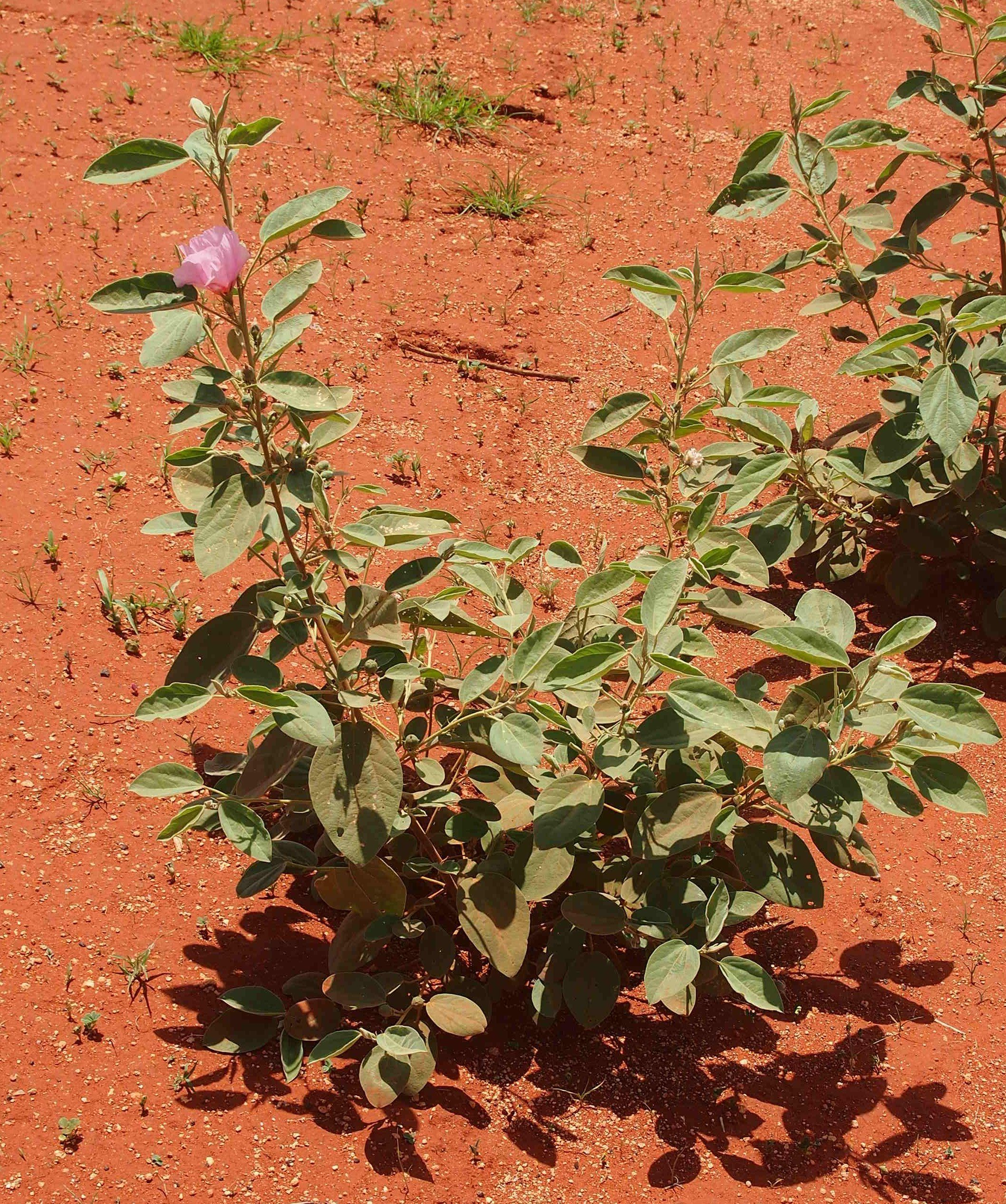

Scientific classification
- Kingdom: Plantae
- Clade: Embryophytes
- Clade: Tracheophytes
- Clade: Angiosperms
- Clade: Eudicots
- Clade: Rosids
- Order: Malvales
- Family: Malvaceae
- Genus: Gossypium
- Species: G. australe

Binomial name
- Gossypium australe F.Muell

= Gossypium australe =

Species of flowering plant in the mallow family

Gossypium australe is an endemic woody shrub, related to cotton, found across a broad swath of northern Australia from West Australia to Queensland. Preferring sandy soils near watercourses, it grows to about two or three feet tall. The leaves are grey and hairy, oval to elliptic, 3 inches (8 cm) long and soft to the touch. Flowers are around 1–2 inches (3–5 cm) long and present a pale pink mauve 'rose' with a deeper shade at the centre. Fruit are hairy, spherical and contain a bristly seed one-sixth inch (0.4 cm) long.

It is sometimes confused with Sturt's desert rose Gossypium sturtianum.
