= APMC Market, Vashi =

Wholesale market and trading hub in Navi Mumbai

The APMC Market in Vashi, is a wholesale agricultural and produce trading hubs in India. It is located in the city of Navi Mumbai in the state of Maharashtra in India. The full form of APMC is Agriculture Produce Market Committee. It holds several complexes for different types of commodities and agricultural products. They are Masala Market, Kanda-Batata Market, Fruit Market, Vegetable Market, and Danabunder, etc.

Shree Nilkantheshwar Mahadev Mandir at the complex of Danabunder in APMC Market, Vashi.

== Description ==
The APMC Market is an agricultural trade hub that feeds the Mumbai Metropolitan region. It is spread over 122 hectares of land in Vashi, Turbhe and Sanpada. It comes under the territory of the Navi Mumbai Municipal Corporation. On the daily basis around 1,800 tonnes of vegetables roll into the yard of the APMC Market. These vegetables are generally brought from the vegetable producing areas like Nashik, Pune, Satara, and Sangli, etc.

View of the Masala Market Complex Gate from the near Truck Terminal premises.

The APMC Market in Vashi is the largest wholesale agricultural market of the country. The state government has accorded it the status of "Market of National Importance". The APMC Market deals in large quantities of fruits, vegetables, grains, and other agricultural products from various parts of Maharashtra and across the country.

View of a part of the Fruit Market at APMC, Turbhe.

== History ==
The ageing structures in the APMC Market date back to the 1970s and 1980s.
