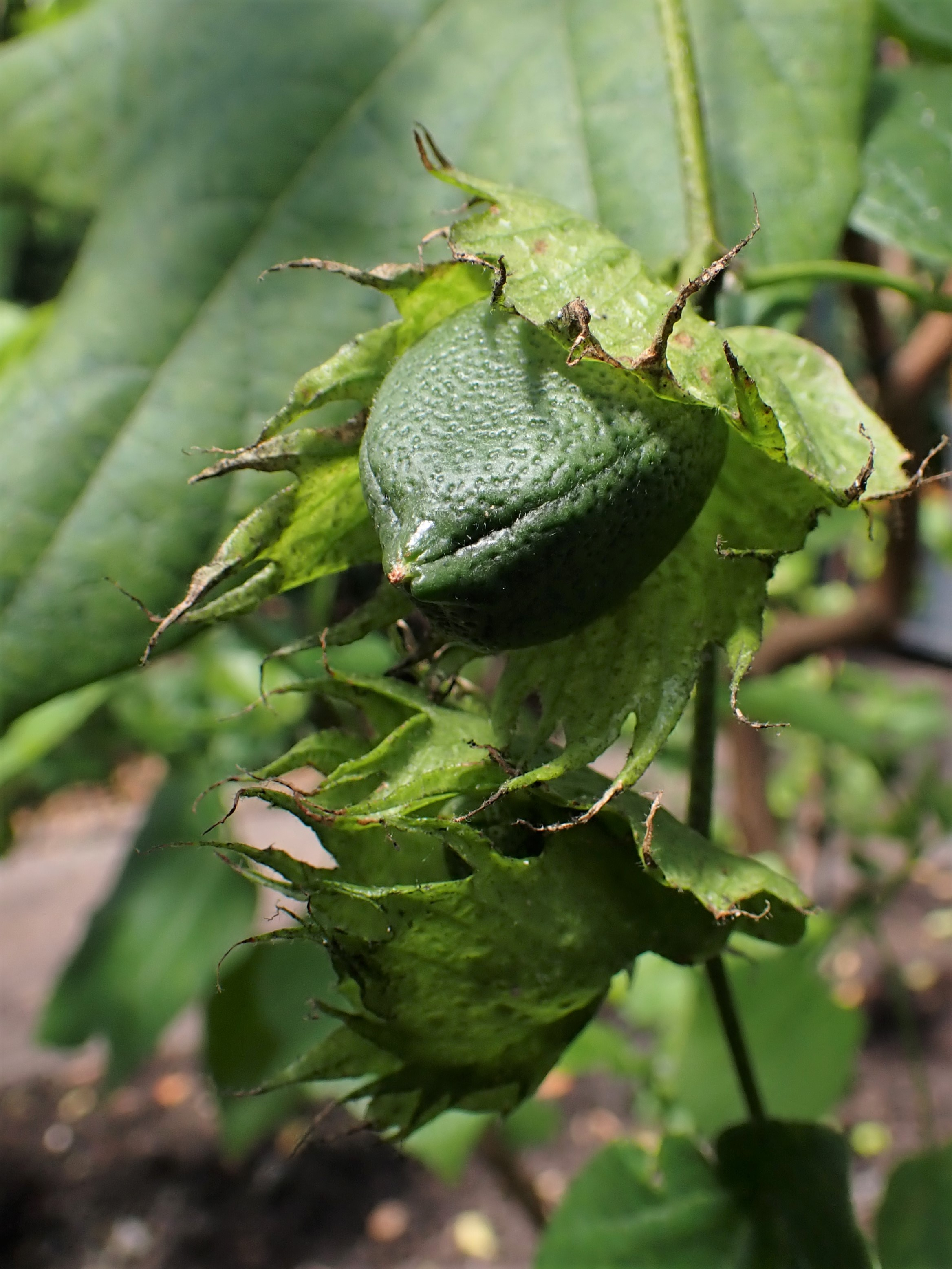

Conservation status
- Endangered (IUCN 3.1)

Scientific classification
- Kingdom: Plantae
- Clade: Tracheophytes
- Clade: Angiosperms
- Clade: Eudicots
- Clade: Rosids
- Order: Malvales
- Family: Malvaceae
- Genus: Gossypium
- Species: G. raimondii

Binomial name
- Gossypium raimondii Ulbr.

Synonyms
- Gossypium klotzschianum subsp. raimondii (Ulbr.) Roberty

= Gossypium raimondii =

Species of flowering plant

Gossypium raimondii is a species of cotton plant endemic to northern Peru. Its genome has been sequenced in order to improve the productivity and fiber quality of other Gossypium species.
