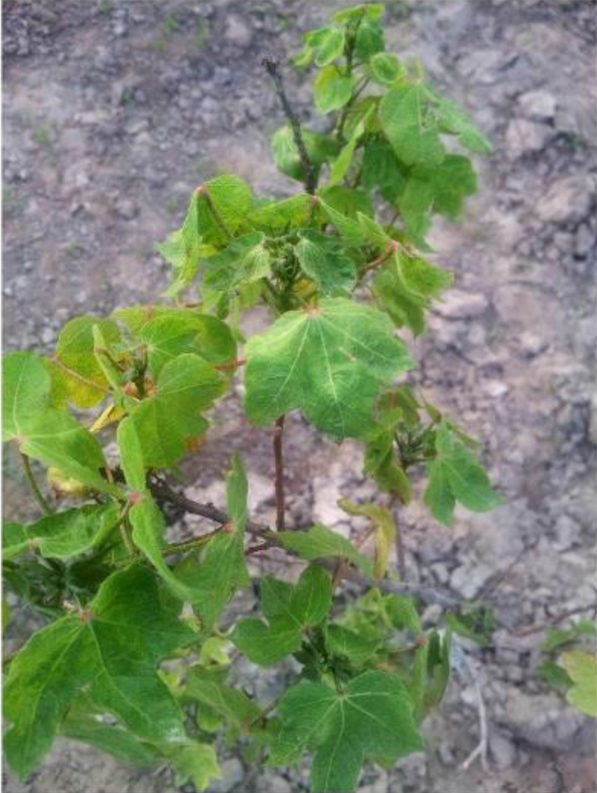

Conservation status
- Endangered (IUCN 3.1)

Scientific classification
- Kingdom: Plantae
- Clade: Tracheophytes
- Clade: Angiosperms
- Clade: Eudicots
- Clade: Rosids
- Order: Malvales
- Family: Malvaceae
- Genus: Gossypium
- Species: G. mustelinum

Binomial name
- Gossypium mustelinum Miers ex G.Watt

= Gossypium mustelinum =

Species of plant

Gossypium mustelinum is a shrub in the mallow family which is native to tropical northeast Brazil. It is an endangered wild relative of cultivated cotton.
