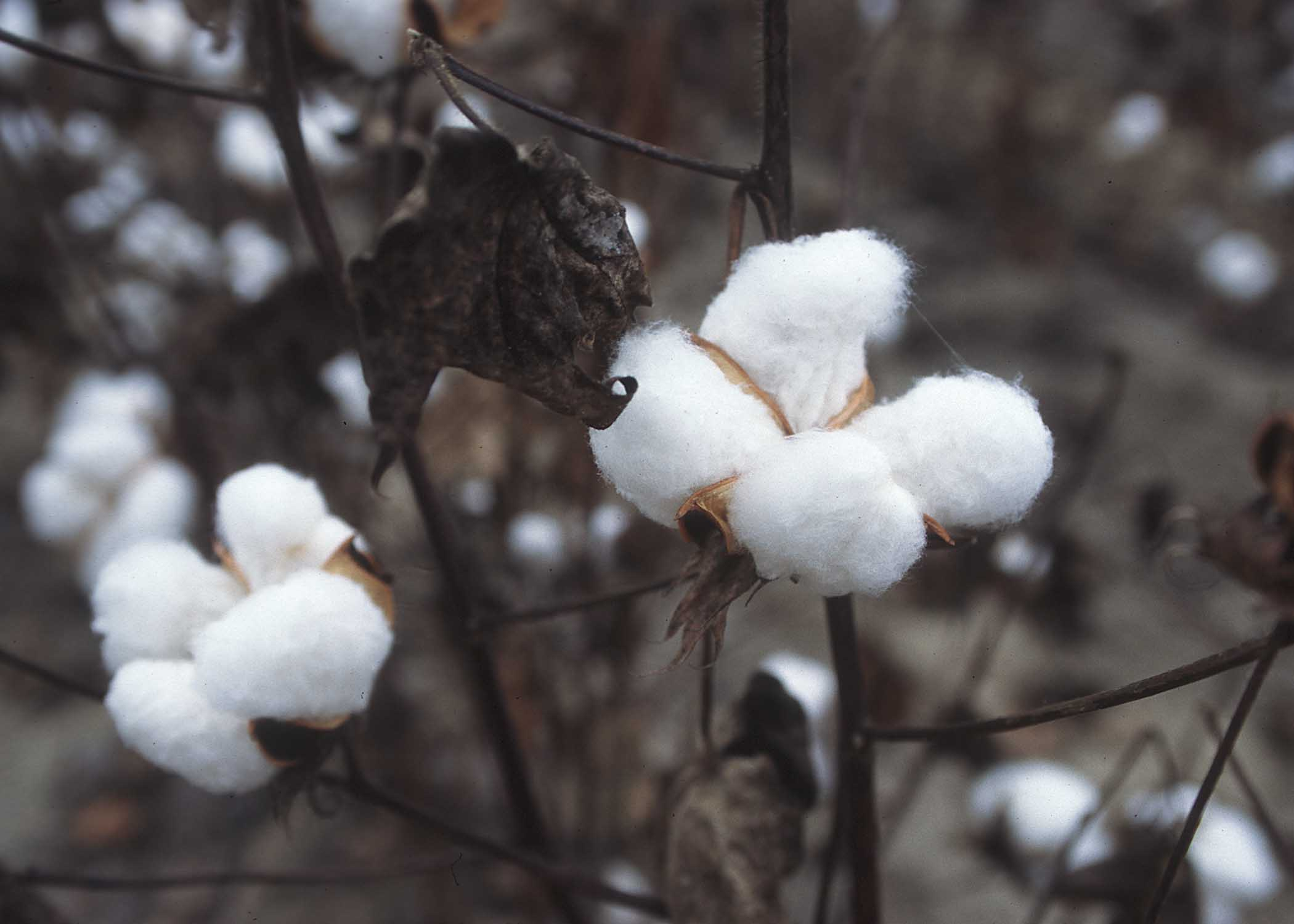

Conservation status
- Vulnerable (IUCN 3.1)

Scientific classification
- Kingdom: Plantae
- Clade: Tracheophytes
- Clade: Angiosperms
- Clade: Eudicots
- Clade: Rosids
- Order: Malvales
- Family: Malvaceae
- Genus: Gossypium
- Species: G. hirsutum

Binomial name
- Gossypium hirsutum L.

= Gossypium hirsutum =

Upland cotton

Species of flowering plant in the mallow family

Gossypium hirsutum, also known as upland cotton or Mexican cotton, is the most widely planted species of cotton in the world. Globally, about 90% of all cotton production is of cultivars derived from this species. In the United States, the world's largest exporter of cotton, it constitutes approximately 95% of all cotton production. It is native from Mexico to Ecuador and northeast Brazil, the Leeward Antilles in the Caribbean and the Pacific (Fiji, Marianas, Polynesia and Revillagigedo Islands).

It is believed that Gossypium hirsutum was created when a wild Mexican cotton species mixed with the wild African species Gossypium herbaceum around 5–10 million years ago, producing a hybrid species with four pairs of chromosomes (totaling 52 chromosomes) via polyploidy.

The original native range of Gossyypium hirsutum centers on the Yucatán Peninsula, where researchers have found the greatest genetic diversity among samples taken from the wild.

Archeological evidence from the Tehuacan Valley in Mexico shows the cultivation of this species as long ago as 3,500 BC, although there is as yet no evidence as to exactly where it may have been first domesticated. This is the earliest evidence of cotton cultivation in the Americas found thus far.

Gossypium hirsutum includes a number of varieties or cross-bred cultivars with varying fiber lengths and tolerances to a number of growing conditions. The longer length varieties are called "long staple upland" and the shorter length varieties are referred to as "short staple upland". The long staple varieties are the most widely cultivated in commercial production.

Besides being fibre crops, Gossypium hirsutum and Gossypium herbaceum are the main species used to produce cottonseed oil.

The Zuni people use this plant to make ceremonial garments, and the fuzz is made into cords and used ceremonially.

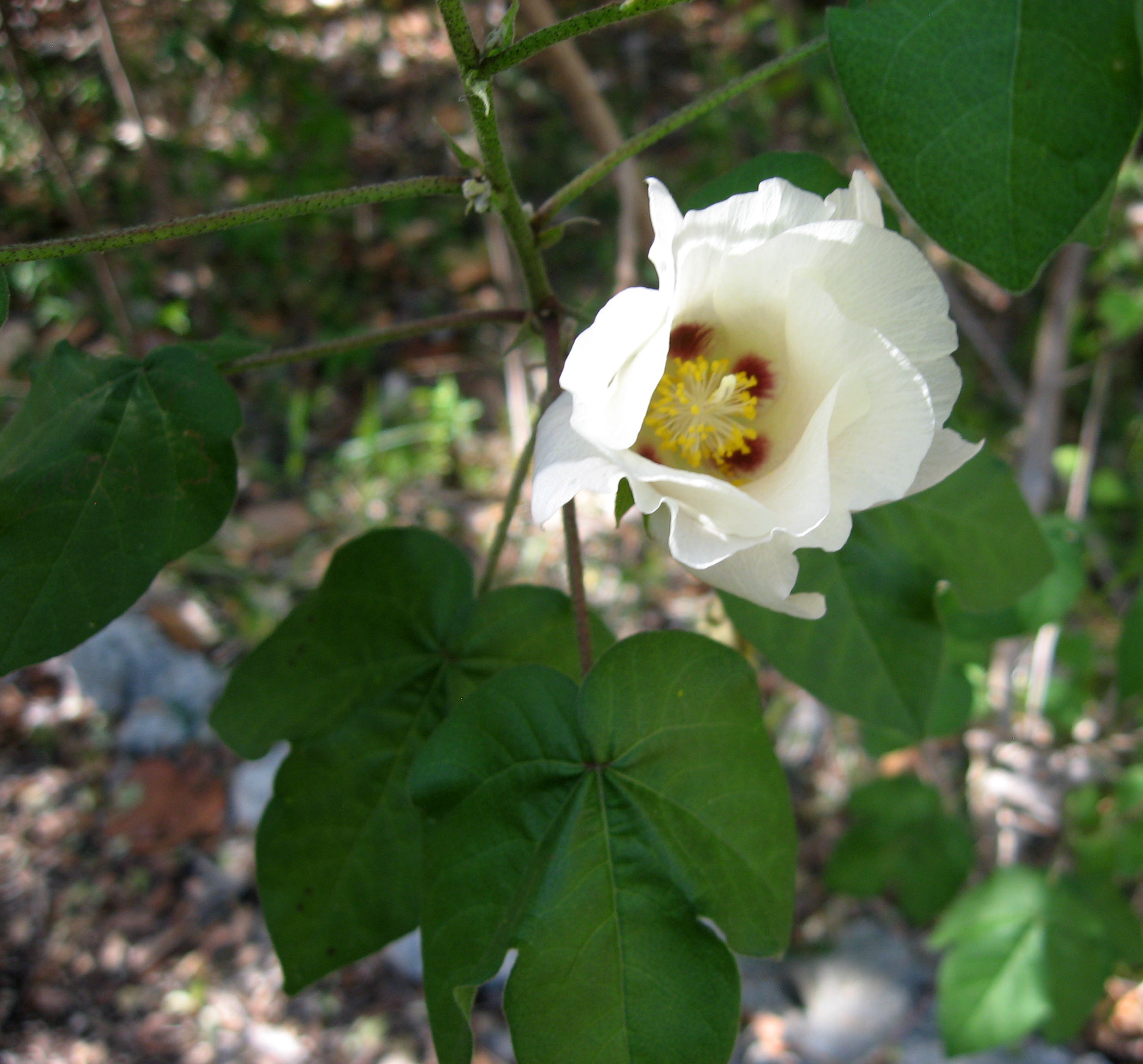
Flowers of Gossypium hirsutum

This species shows extrafloral nectar production.

== Synonyms ==
- Gossypium barbadense var. marie-galante (G. Watt) A. Chev., Rev. Int. Bot. Appl Agric. Trop. 18:118. 1938.
- Gossypium jamaicense Macfad., Fl. Jamaica 1:73. 1837.
- Gossypium lanceolatum Tod., Relaz. cult. coton. 185. 1877.
- Gossypium marie-galante G. Watt, Kew Bull. 1927:344. 1927.
- Gossypium mexicanum Tod., Ind. sem. panorm. 1867:20, 31. 1868.
- Gossypium morrillii O. F. Cook & J. Hubb., J. Washington Acad. Sci. 16:339. 1926.
- Gossypium palmeri G. Watt, Wild cult. cotton 204, t. 34. 1907.
- Gossypium punctatum Schumach., Beskr. Guin. pl. 309. 1827.
- Gossypium purpurascens Poir., Encycl. suppl. 2:369. 1811.
- Gossypium religiosum L., Syst. nat. ed. 12, 2:462. 1767.
- Gossypium schottii G. Watt, Wild cult. cotton 206. 1907.
- Gossypium taitense Parl., Sp. Cotoni 39, t. 6, fig. A. 1866.
- Gossypium tridens O. F. Cook & J. Hubb., J. Washington Acad. Sci. 16:547. 1926.
