= Farmers' Produce Trade and Commerce (Promotion and Facilitation) Act, 2020 =

Act of Indian Parliament

Parliament of India
- Long title: An Act to provide for the creation of an ecosystem where the farmers and traders enjoy the freedom of choice relating to sale and purchase of farmers’ produce
- Citation: Act No. 21 of 2020
- Territorial extent: India
- Considered by: Parliament of India
- Enacted by: Lok Sabha
- Enacted: September 17, 2020
- Enacted by: Rajya Sabha
- Enacted: September 20, 2020
- Signed by: Ram Nath Kovind; President of India
- Signed: 27 September 2020

Legislative history

Initiating chamber: Lok Sabha
- Bill title: Farmers' Produce Trade and Commerce (Promotion and Facilitation) Bill, 2020
- Bill citation: Bill No. 113 of 2020
- Introduced by: Narendra Singh Tomar; Minister of Agriculture and Farmers Welfare
- Introduced: September 17, 2020
- Status: Repealed

The Farmers' Produce Trade and Commerce (Promotion and Facilitation) Act, 2020 was an act of the Indian Government that permits intrastate and inter-state trade of farmers’ produce beyond the physical premises of Agricultural Produce Market Committee (APMC) market yards (mandis) and other markets notified under state APMC Acts.

The Act was collectively passed as part of the 2020 Farm Bills.

The Government of India has transferred the money for the wheat procured by the Food Corporation of India (FCI) in April 2021, directly to the bank accounts of farmers - an amount of Rs 13.71 crore benefiting around 1.6 lakh farmers in Punjab has been transferred online.

== Agricultural reform ==
- The essential commodities Act 1955 amended.
- The Act of 1955 has been amended to help both farmers and consumers while bringing in price stability. The following benefits are expected from this reform move.
  - Commodities like cereals, pulses, oilseeds, edible oil, onion and potatoes will be removed from list of essential commodities
  - Freedom to produce, hold, move, distribute and supply
  - It will help drive up investment.
  - In situations such as war, famine, extraordinary price rise and natural calamity, such agricultural foodstuff can be regulated.
- Barrier free trade. Like The farming produce trade and commerce (promotion and facilitation) Act 2020 (status of the Act is Halted)
- Freedom to engage with buyers. Like Farmer(empowerment and protection) agreement on price assurance and farm services Act 2020.

== Farmers (Empowerment and Protection) Agreement on Price Assurance and Farm Services Act ==
This Act, along with the Farmers (Empowerment and Protection) Agreement on Price Assurance and Farm Services Act, was promulgated by the Union Cabinet on 5 June 2020. The Lok Sabha approved the bills on 17 September 2020, and Rajya Sabha on 20 September 2020.

== Provisions ==
Prior to the 2020 legislation, agricultural trade in India could only be conducted in APMC market yards (mandis). This Act, however, also allows trading in "outside trade areas"—such as farm gates, factory premises, warehouses, silos, and cold storages—and prohibits state governments from levying any market fee or cess on farmers, traders; it also aims to provide electronic platforms for trading the produce of farmers in such areas.

The Act seeks to facilitate lucrative prices for farmers through competitive alternative trading channels to promote barrier-free inter-state and intrastate trade of agriculture goods. It also permits the electronic trading of farmers' produce in the specified trade area, facilitating direct and online buying & selling of such products through electronic devices and internet.

== Criticism ==
The Act bypasses the Agricultural Produce Market Committee altogether, creating a separate structure of trading. Before the Act, state governments levied taxes for agricultural produce that was bought outside the designated APMC mandi; this Act prohibits this and creates an incentive for buyers to purchase products outside the regulated APMC mandi.

The new Bills give the impression that farmers had unnecessary restrictions to trade freely for agricultural products, and mandis were the designated space for all transactions. Accordingly, the amendment of the APMC Act, and the ensuing political uproar, are mostly significant for farmers in Punjab and Haryana, where mandis are the central place of transaction. In contrast, NSSO data from a 2012–13 "situation assessment survey" of farmers reveals that most households in India sell off their crops through private traders or input dealers, rather than mandis or cooperatives.

Dilip Mohite Patil, who is the president of the Maharashtra Rajya Bazaar Samiti Sahakari Sangh, a federation of Maharashtra's 306 APMCs, claimed that around 100-125 market committees in the Vidarbha and Marathwada regions have reported almost no business and are on the verge of closure after the central ordinance was announced.

Food Processing Industries Minister Harsimrat Kaur Badal of Shiromani Akali Dal resigned from her post in protest against the bills. Farmers all over the country have held protests against the bills.

== See also ==
- Agricultural produce market committee
- Ministry of Agriculture & Farmers' Welfare
- Farmers (Empowerment and Protection) Agreement on Price Assurance and Farm Services Act, 2020
- Agricultural marketing
- Farmer’s Produce Trade and Commerce Act, 2020 Rules
