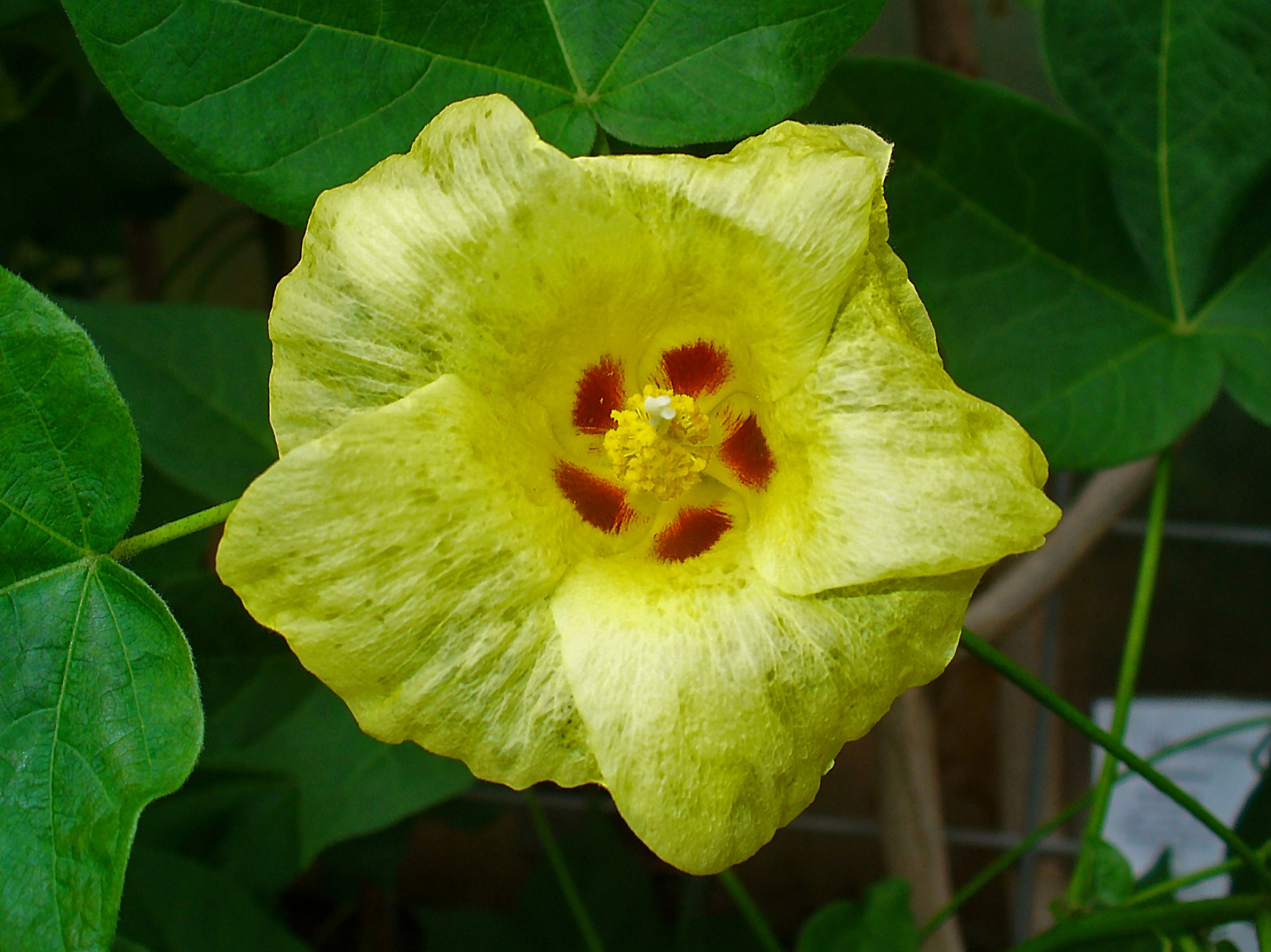
- Flower of Gossypium herbaceum

Scientific classification
- Kingdom: Plantae
- Clade: Embryophytes
- Clade: Tracheophytes
- Clade: Angiosperms
- Clade: Eudicots
- Clade: Rosids
- Order: Malvales
- Family: Malvaceae
- Subfamily: Malvoideae
- Tribe: Gossypieae
- Genus: Gossypium; L.

Type species
- Gossypium arboreum L.

Species
- See text

Synonyms
- Erioxylum Rose & Standl.; × Hemiultragossypium Roberty; Ingenhouzia Moc. & Sessé ex DC.; Neogossypium Roberty; Notoxylinon Lewton; Selera Ulbr.; Sturtia R.Br.; Thurberia A.Gray; Ultragossypium Roberty; Xylon Mill.

= Gossypium =

Genus of flowering plants in the mallow family

Gossypium (/ɡɒˈsɪpiəm/) is a genus of flowering plants in the tribe Gossypieae of the mallow family, Malvaceae, from which cotton is harvested. It is native to tropical and subtropical regions of the Old and New Worlds. There are about 50 Gossypium species, making it the largest genus in the tribe Gossypieae, and new species continue to be discovered. The name of the genus is derived from the Arabic word goz, which refers to a soft substance.

Cotton is the primary natural fibre used by humans today, amounting to about 80% of world natural fibre production. Where cotton is cultivated, it is a major oilseed crop and a main protein source for animal feed. Cotton is thus of great importance for agriculture, industry and trade, especially for tropical and subtropical countries in Africa, South America and Asia. Consequently, the genus Gossypium has long attracted the attention of scientists.

The origin of the genus Gossypium is dated to around 5–10 million years ago. Gossypium species are distributed in arid to semiarid regions of the tropics and subtropics. Generally shrubs or shrub-like plants, the species of this genus are extraordinarily diverse in morphology and adaptation, ranging from fire-adapted, herbaceous perennials in Australia to trees in Mexico. Most wild cottons are diploid, but a group of five species from America and Pacific islands are tetraploid, apparently due to a single hybridization event around 1.5 to 2 million years ago. The tetraploid species are G. hirsutum, G. tomentosum, G. mustelinum, G. barbadense, and G. darwinii.

Cultivated cottons are perennial shrubs, most often grown as annuals. Plants are 1–2 m high in modern cropping systems, sometimes higher in traditional, multiannual cropping systems, now largely disappearing. The leaves are broad and lobed, with three to five (or rarely seven) lobes. The seeds are contained in a capsule called a "boll", each seed surrounded by fibres of two types. These fibres are the more commercially interesting part of the plant and they are separated from the seed by a process called ginning. At the first ginning, the longer fibres, called staples, are removed and these are twisted together to form yarn for making thread and weaving into high quality textiles. At the second ginning, the shorter fibres, called "linters", are removed, and these are woven into lower quality textiles (which include the eponymous lint). Commercial species of cotton plant are G. hirsutum (97% of world production), G. barbadense (1–2%), G. arboreum and G. herbaceum (together, ~1%). Many varieties of cotton have been developed by selective breeding and hybridization of these species. Experiments are ongoing to cross-breed various desirable traits of wild cotton species into the principal commercial species, such as resistance to insects and diseases, and drought tolerance. Cotton fibres occur naturally in colours of white, brown, green, and some mixing of these.

== Species ==
55 species are accepted.

- Gossypium anapoides J.M.Stewart, Craven, Brubaker & Wendel
- Gossypium anomalum Wawra & Peyr.
- Gossypium arboreum L. – tree cotton (India and Pakistan)
- Gossypium areysianum Deflers
- Gossypium aridum (Rose & Standl.) Skovst.
- Gossypium australe F.Muell (northwestern Australia)
- Gossypium barbadense L. – Creole cotton/Sea Island Cotton (tropical South America)
- Gossypium bickii (F.M.Bailey) Prokh.
- Gossypium bricchettii (Ulbr.) Vollesen
- Gossypium californicum Mauer
- Gossypium contextum O.F.Cook & J.W.Hubb.
- Gossypium costulatum Tod.
- Gossypium cunninghamii Tod.
- Gossypium darwinii G.Watt – Darwin's cotton (Galápagos Islands)
- Gossypium dicladum O.F.Cook & J.W.Hubb.
- Gossypium ekmanianum Wittm.
- Gossypium enthyle Fryxell, Craven & J.M.Stewart
- Gossypium exiguum Fryxell, Craven & J.M.Stewart
- Gossypium gossypioides (Ulbr.) Standl.
- Gossypium harknessii Brandegee
- Gossypium herbaceum L. – Levant cotton (southern Africa and the Arabian Peninsula)
- Gossypium hirsutum L. – upland cotton (Central America, Mexico, the Caribbean and southern Florida)
- Gossypium hypadenum O.F.Cook & J.W.Hubb.
- Gossypium incanum (O.Schwartz) Hillc.
- Gossypium irenaeum Lewton
- Gossypium klotzschianum Andersson
- Gossypium laxum L.Ll.Phillips
- Gossypium lobatum Gentry
- Gossypium londonderriense Fryxell, Craven & J.M.Stewart
- Gossypium longicalyx J.B.Hutch. & B.J.S.Lee
- Gossypium marchantii Fryxell, Craven & J.M.Stewart
- Gossypium morrilli O.F.Cook & J.W.Hubb.
- Gossypium mustelinum Miers ex G.Watt
- Gossypium nelsonii Fryxell
- Gossypium nobile Fryxell, Craven & J.M.Stewart
- Gossypium patens O.F.Cook & J.W.Hubb.
- Gossypium pilosum Fryxell
- Gossypium populifolium (Benth.) F.Muell. ex Tod.
- Gossypium pulchellum (C.A.Gardner) Fryxell
- Gossypium raimondii Ulbr. – one of the putative progenitor species of tetraploid cotton, alongside G. arboreum
- Gossypium robinsonii F.Muell.
- Gossypium rotundifolium Fryxell, Craven & J.M.Stewart
- Gossypium schwendimanii Fryxell & S.D.Koch
- Gossypium somalense (Gürke) J.B.Hutch., Silow & S.G.Stephens
- Gossypium stephensii J.P.Gallagher, C.E.Grover & Wendel
- Gossypium stocksii Mast.
- Gossypium sturtianum J.H. Willis – Sturt's desert rose (Australia)
- Gossypium thurberi Tod. – Arizona wild cotton (Arizona and northern Mexico)
- Gossypium timorense Prokh.
- Gossypium tomentosum Nutt. ex Seem – Maʻo or Hawaiian cotton (Hawaii)
- Gossypium trifurcatum Vollesen
- Gossypium trilobum (DC.) Skovst.
- Gossypium triphyllum (Harv.) Hochr.
- Gossypium turneri Fryxell
- Gossypium vollesenii Fryxell}

=== Formerly placed in genus Gossypium ===
- Gossypioides brevilanatum (Hochr.) J.B.Hutch. (as G. brevilanatum Hochr.)
- Gossypioides kirkii (Mast.) J.B.Hutch. (as Gossypium kirkii Mast.)
- Kokia drynarioides (Seem.) Lewton (as G. drynarioides Seem.)

== Gossypium genome ==
A public genome sequencing effort of cotton was initiated in 2007 by a consortium of public researchers. They agreed on a strategy to sequence the genome of cultivated, allotetraploid cotton. "Allotetraploid" means that the genomes of these cotton species comprise two distinct subgenomes, referred to as the At and Dt (the 't' for tetraploid, to distinguish them from the A and D genomes of the related diploid species). The strategy is to sequence first the D-genome relative of allotetraploid cottons, G. raimondii, a wild South American (Peru, Ecuador) cotton species, because of its smaller size due essentially to less repetitive DNA (retrotransposons mainly). It has nearly one-third the number of bases of tetraploid cotton (AD), and each chromosome is only present once. The A genome of G. arboreum, the 'Old-World' cotton species (grown in India in particular), would be sequenced next. Its genome is roughly twice the size of G. raimondii's. Once both A and D genome sequences are assembled, then research could begin to sequence the actual genomes of tetraploid cultivated cotton varieties. This strategy is out of necessity; if one were to sequence the tetraploid genome without model diploid genomes, the euchromatic DNA sequences of the AD genomes would co-assemble and the repetitive elements of AD genomes would assemble independently into A and D sequences, respectively. Then there would be no way to untangle the mess of AD sequences without comparing them to their diploid counterparts.

The public sector effort continues with the goal to create a high-quality, draft genome sequence from reads generated by all sources. The public-sector effort has generated Sanger reads of BACs, fosmids, and plasmids, as well as 454 reads. These later types of reads will be instrumental in assembling an initial draft of the D genome. In 2010, two companies (Monsanto and Illumina), completed enough Illumina sequencing to cover the D genome of G. raimondii about 50x. They announced they would donate their raw reads to the public. This public relations effort gave them some recognition for sequencing the cotton genome. Once the D genome is assembled from all of this raw material, it will undoubtedly assist in the assembly of the AD genomes of cultivated varieties of cotton, but a lot of hard work remains.

== Cotton pests and diseases ==
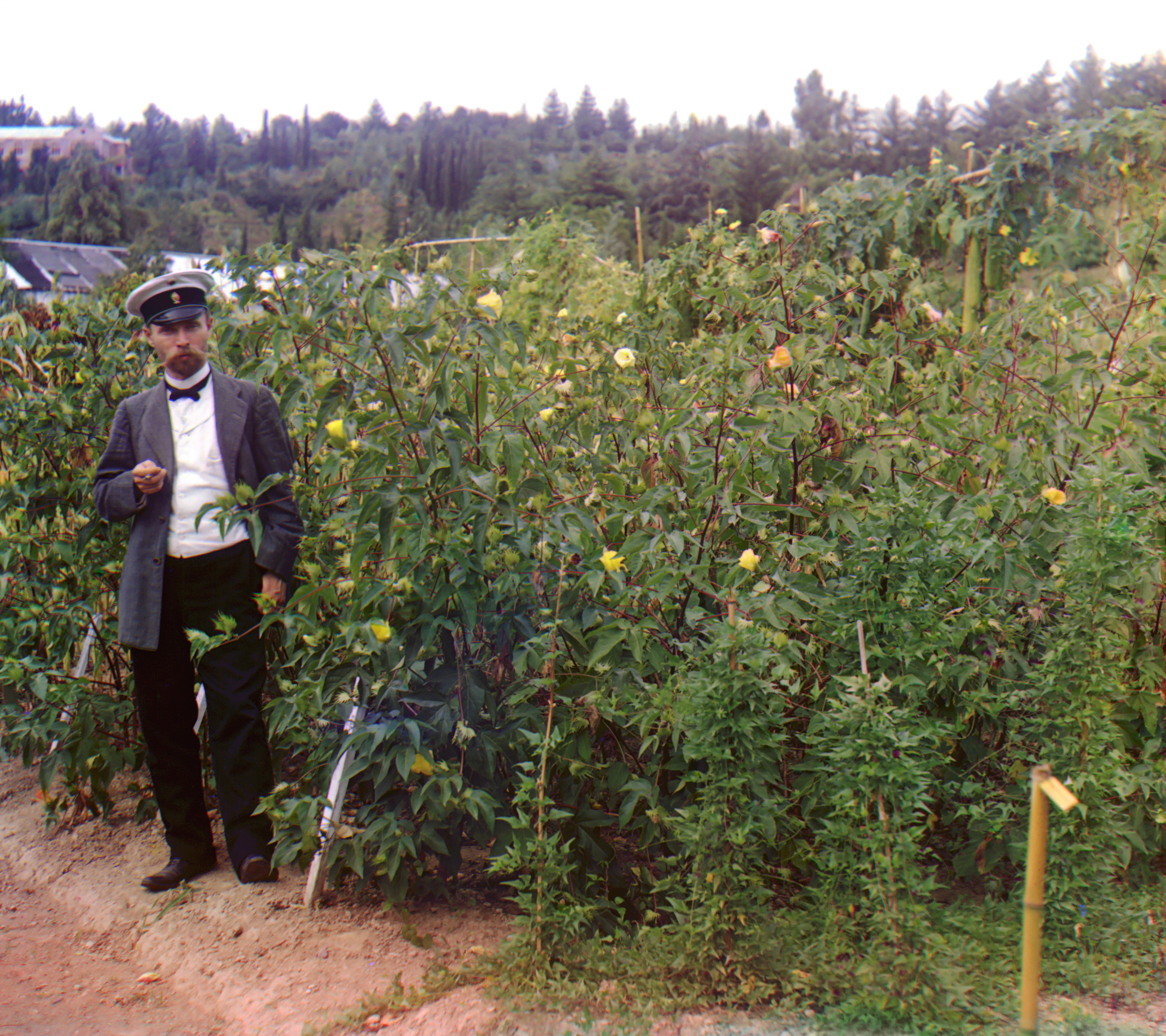
Cotton field in Sukhumi Botanical Garden, photo circa 1912

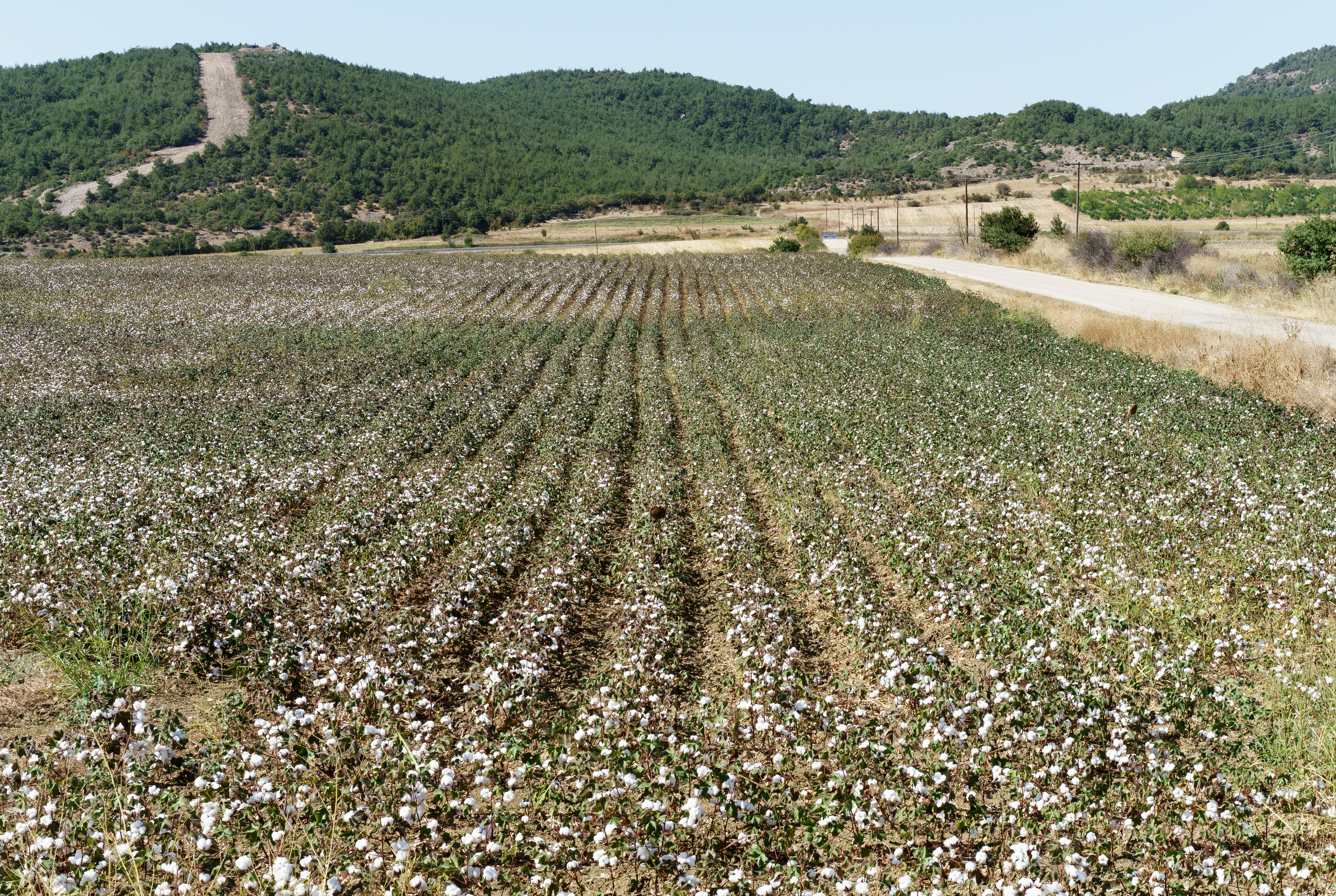
Cotton field in Greece

=== Pests ===
- Boll weevil, Anthonomus grandis
- Cotton aphid, Aphis gossypii
- Cotton stainer, Dysdercus koenigii
- Cotton bollworm, Helicoverpa zea, and native budworm, Helicoverpa punctigera, are caterpillars that damage cotton crops.
  Some other Lepidoptera (butterfly and moth) larvae also feed on cotton – see list of Lepidoptera that feed on cotton plants.
- Green mirid (Creontiades dilutus), a sucking insect
- Spider mites, Tetranychus urticae, T. ludeni and T. lambi
- Thrips, Thrips tabaci and Frankliniella schultzei

=== Diseases ===
- Alternaria leaf spot, caused by Alternaria macrospora and Alternaria alternata
- Anthracnose boll rot, caused by Colletotrichum gossypii
- Black root rot, caused by the fungus Thielaviopsis basicola
- Blight caused by Xanthomonas campestris pv. malvacearum
- Fusarium boll rot caused by Fusarium spp.
- Phytophthora boll rot, caused by Phytophthora nicotianae var. parasitica
- Sclerotinia boll rot, caused by the fungus Sclerotinia sclerotiorum
- Stigmatomycosis, caused by the fungi Ashbya gossypii, Eremothecium coryli, (Nematospora coryli) and Aureobasidium pullulans

== Gallery ==
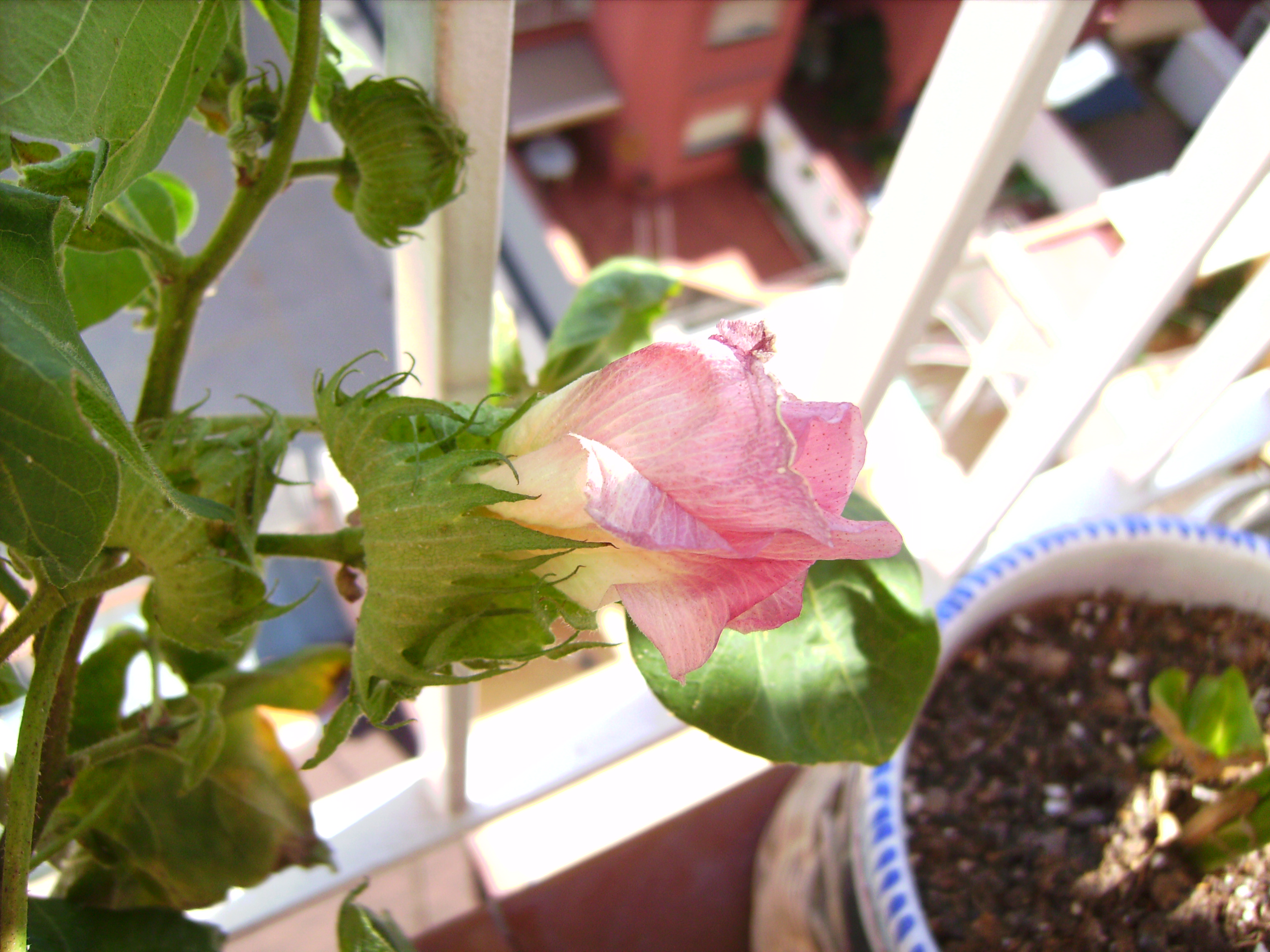
A Gossypium hirsutum flower, lateral view, growing in Barcelona

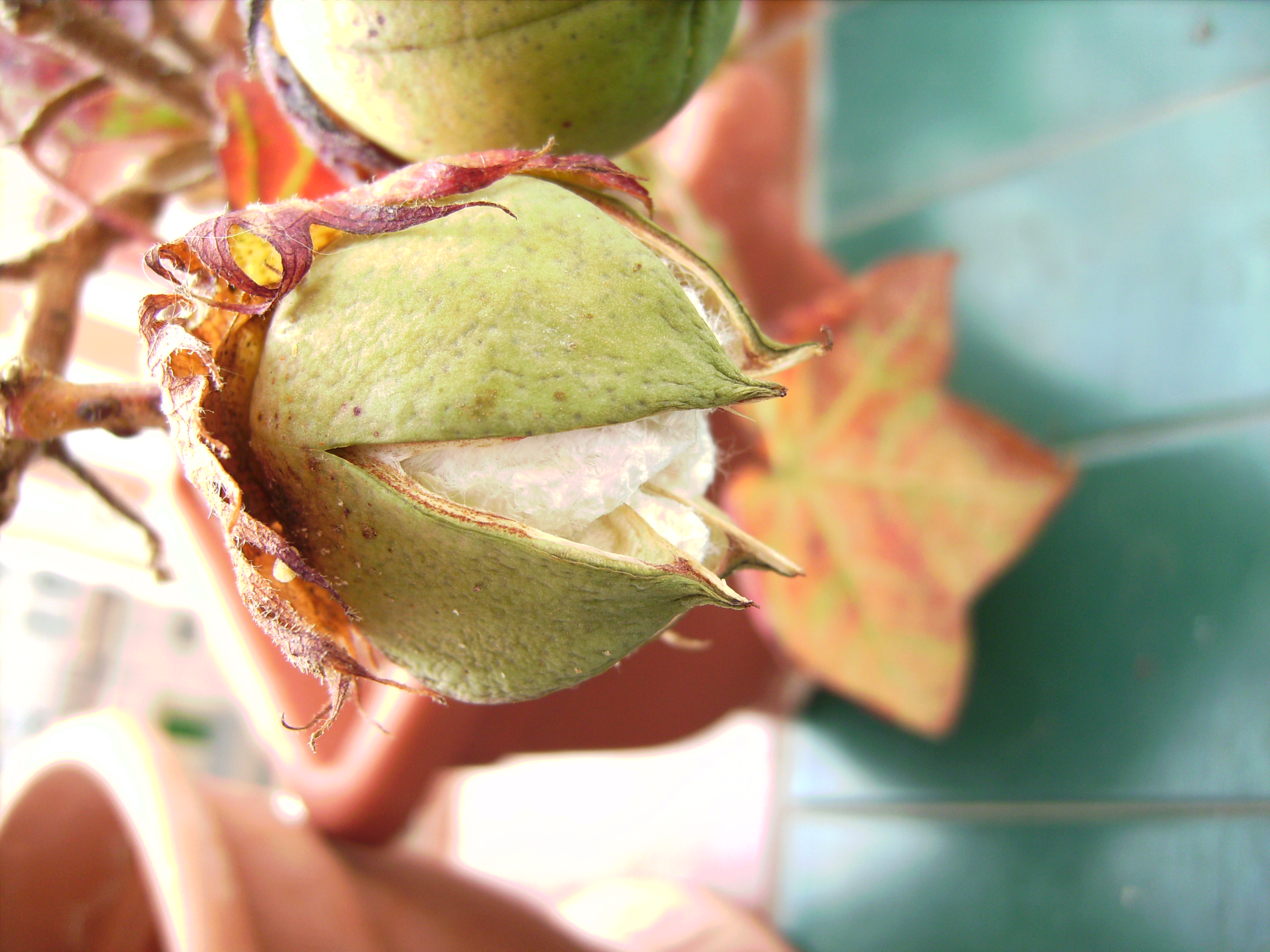
The same G. hirsutum plant with the opening capsule

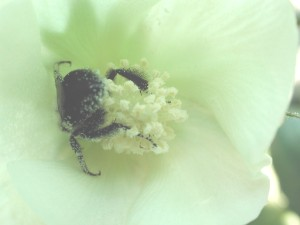
G. hirsutum flower with bumblebee pollinator, Hemingway, South Carolina

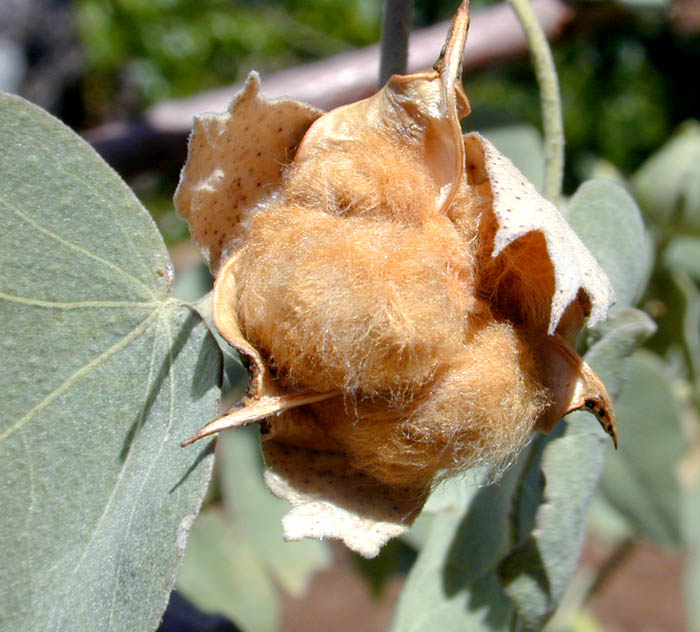
G. tomentosum boll

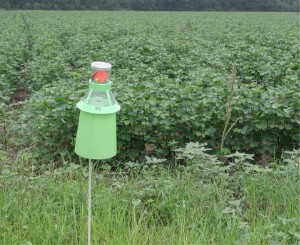
Integrated pest management bollworm trap at a cotton field in Manning, South Carolina

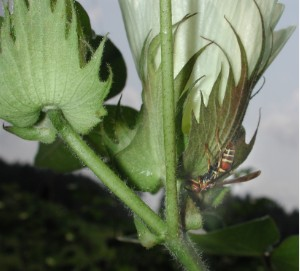
Natural biocontrol: predatory Polistes wasp looking for bollworms or other caterpillars on cotton plant in Hemingway, South Carolina

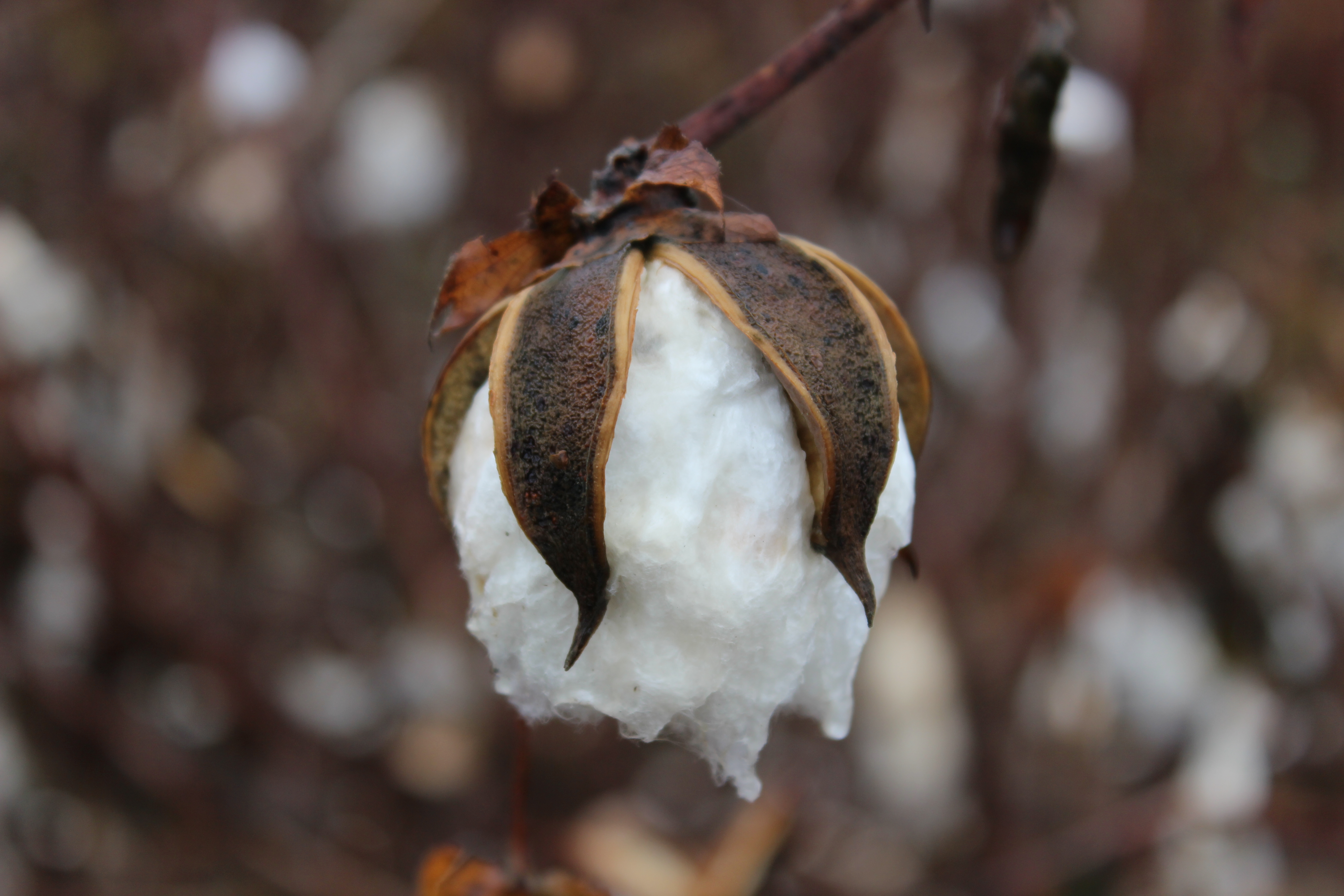
Cotton boll ready for harvest, South Carolina

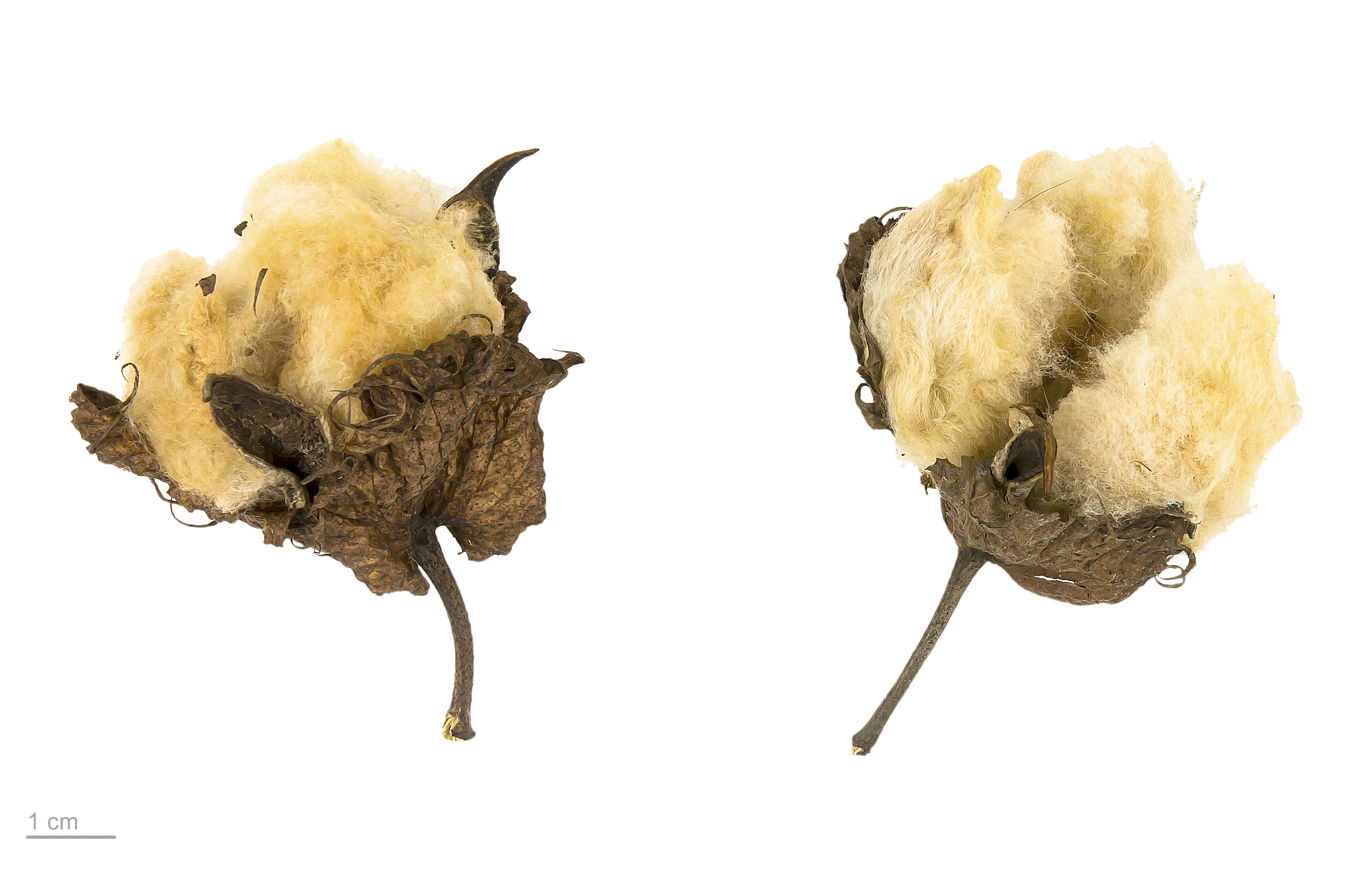
Gossypium Sp. Brun - MHNT

== See also ==
- Vegetable Lamb of Tartary, a European legendary plant remotely based on cotton.
