= Farm to retail price spread =

Difference between the farm price and retail price of food

The farm-to-retail price spread is the difference between the farm price and the retail price of food, reflecting charges for processing, shipping, and retailing farm goods (sometimes called the marketing spread).

The current spread accounts for about three-fourths of the retail price for a market basket of foods, according to USDA. The farm value varies for each type of food; for example, in 2004, it accounted for about 35% of the retail cost of eggs, compared to about 19% for fresh fruit and vegetables, and about 6% for cereal and bakery products.
