= Farmers (Empowerment and Protection) Agreement on Price Assurance and Farm Services Act, 2020 =

Act of Indian Parliament

Parliament of India
- Long title: An Act to provide for a national framework on farming agreements that protects and empowers farmers to engage with agri-business firms, processors, wholesalers, exporters or large retailers
- Citation: Act No. 20 of 2020
- Considered by: Parliament of India
- Enacted by: Lok Sabha
- Enacted: September 17, 2020
- Enacted by: Rajya Sabha
- Enacted: September 20, 2020
- Signed by: Ram Nath Kovind; President of India
- Signed: 27 September 2020

Legislative history

Initiating chamber: Lok Sabha
- Bill citation: Bill No. 112 of 2020
- Introduced by: Narendra Singh Tomar; Minister of Agriculture and Farmers Welfare
- Introduced: September 17, 2020
- First reading: September 17, 2020
- Second reading: September 20, 2020
- Status: Repealed

The Farmers (Empowerment and Protection) Agreement on Price Assurance and Farm Services Act, 2020 was an act of the Indian Government that creates a national framework for contract farming through an agreement between a farmer and a buyer before the production or rearing of any farm produces.

The act was collectively passed as part of the 2020 Farm Bills.

== Background ==
This Act, along with the Farmers’ Produce Trade and Commerce (Promotion and Facilitation) Act, was promulgated by the Union Cabinet on 5 June 2020.

The Lok Sabha (lower house) approved both bills on 17 September 2020, and Rajya Sabha (upper house) on 20 September 2020. For the latter, the Official Opposition demanded physical voting instead of voice voting, but to no effect. Voting rules of Rajya Sabha state that members of the House can challenge the voice voting decision, in which case the votes need to be recorded. However, the Chairman of the House passed the Bill with only voice voting and claimed that the Opposition had created chaos since the rules state that division voting required all members to remain seated while maintaining decorum.

== Provisions ==
The Government asserts that the Act helps protect farmers engaging with agribusiness firms, processors, wholesalers, exporters, or large retailers for farm services and sale of future farming produce by a mutually-agreed lucrative price framework fairly and transparently through a contract.

The Act provided for a 3-level dispute settlement mechanism by the conciliation board, Sub-Divisional Magistrate, and Appellate Authority. The agreement had to provide for a conciliation board as well as a conciliation process for the settlement of disputes.

== Criticism ==
The Act was met with widespread criticism from farmers all over the country (particularly Punjab, Haryana, Western Uttar Pradesh, Uttarakhand and Rajasthan) mainly under the argument that, without any regulation, farmers' interests will be overlooked.

Since the Appellate Authority was the highest level of appeal for the farmer against any private entity, the farmer is effectively prevented from moving the Court. Thus, the Opposition parties claim that the Act is highly skewed in favor of private entities as the individual farmers did not have the resources that private companies had.

On 31 December 2020, All 140 MLAs, including lone BJP members approve a resolution against farm laws in Kerala. The resolution passed by voice vote with all 140 MLAs supporting it.

== See also ==
- Agriculture in India
- Agricultural produce market committee
- 2020–2021 Indian farmers' protest
- Ministry of Agriculture & Farmers' Welfare
- Farmers’ Produce Trade and Commerce (Promotion and Facilitation) Act, 2020
