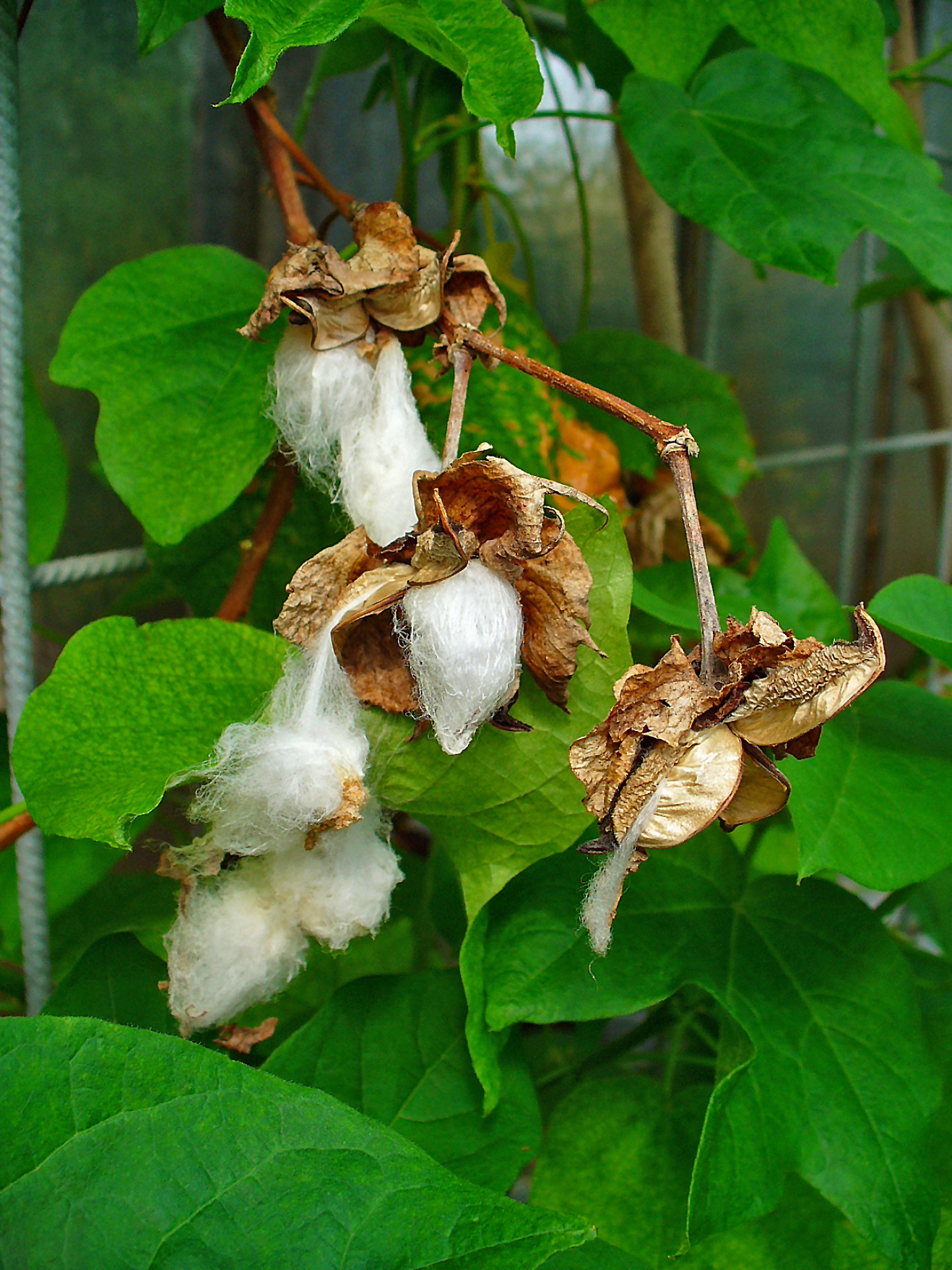

Conservation status
- Data Deficient (IUCN 3.1)

Scientific classification
- Kingdom: Plantae
- Clade: Embryophytes
- Clade: Tracheophytes
- Clade: Angiosperms
- Clade: Eudicots
- Clade: Rosids
- Order: Malvales
- Family: Malvaceae
- Genus: Gossypium
- Species: G. herbaceum

Binomial name
- Gossypium herbaceum L.

= Gossypium herbaceum =

Species of flowering plant in the mallow family

Gossypium herbaceum, commonly known as Levant cotton, is a species of cotton native to semi-arid regions of Southern Africa, as well as from Syria to Afghanistan, where it still grows perennially in the wild as a shrub.

== Description ==
G. herbaceum has high stems that grow 60 to 180 centimetres (2 to 6 ft) high with wide, hairy leaves. Their flowers are small and yellow with a purple center. The plant exhibits extrafloral nectaries (calyculal nectaria, found on the receptacle, near the base of the calyculus).

When ripe and in warm weather, the flower capsule will burst and expose the cotton surrounding the seeds firmly. The cotton produced by this plant is short, about 25 millimetres (1 in) long and is firmly attached to the seed, which is covered in hairy down. Cotton fibres grow from the surface of the seeds and can be separated from these by hand or mechanically; the long fibres are called lint. The cotton fibres consist of nearly pure cellulose. The expected yield is 340 kilograms per hectare (300 pounds per acre).

== Uses ==
The main use of cotton lint is to produce textiles for clothing. The fibres are spun into yarns and these are woven into fabrics, in the farm or house or in factories. Cotton as a fabric is much appreciated because of its comfortable, breathable properties, its resistance and also because it is easily stained.

The cotton plant itself has medicinal uses, and can be cultivated traditionally, in house backyards, for, e.g., women's menstrual cycle pains and irregular bleeding. It is also known to be used after birth to expel the placenta and to increase the lactation, as well as for gastrointestinal issues, such as hemorrhages and diarrhea, for nausea, fevers and headaches.

In the Levant seeds of Gossypium herbaceum were also used for food, feed or oil extraction. Cotton seeds, containing up to 20% oil and 20% proteins, are potentially highly rich as food or feed. Nevertheless, small glands present in all the plant organs of the Gossypium species, except the roots, and especially abundant in the seeds, contain toxic chemicals, in particular the polyphenolic compound gossypol. The gossypol is highly toxic to animals and is an element of the plant direct defence system against herbivorous arthropods. It can cause severe growth and development disorders in humans as well as domestic animals, particularly monogastric animals, while polygastrics are more or less tolerant. For this reason, using oil or whole seeds for human nutrition is dependent upon some way of elimination of the gossypol, through heating or other treatment. The gossypol extracted from cotton seeds has a potential use as a male contraceptive but can cause irreversible infertility after repeated use. In lab rat studies, it has been able to stop early pregnancies.

== Gallery ==
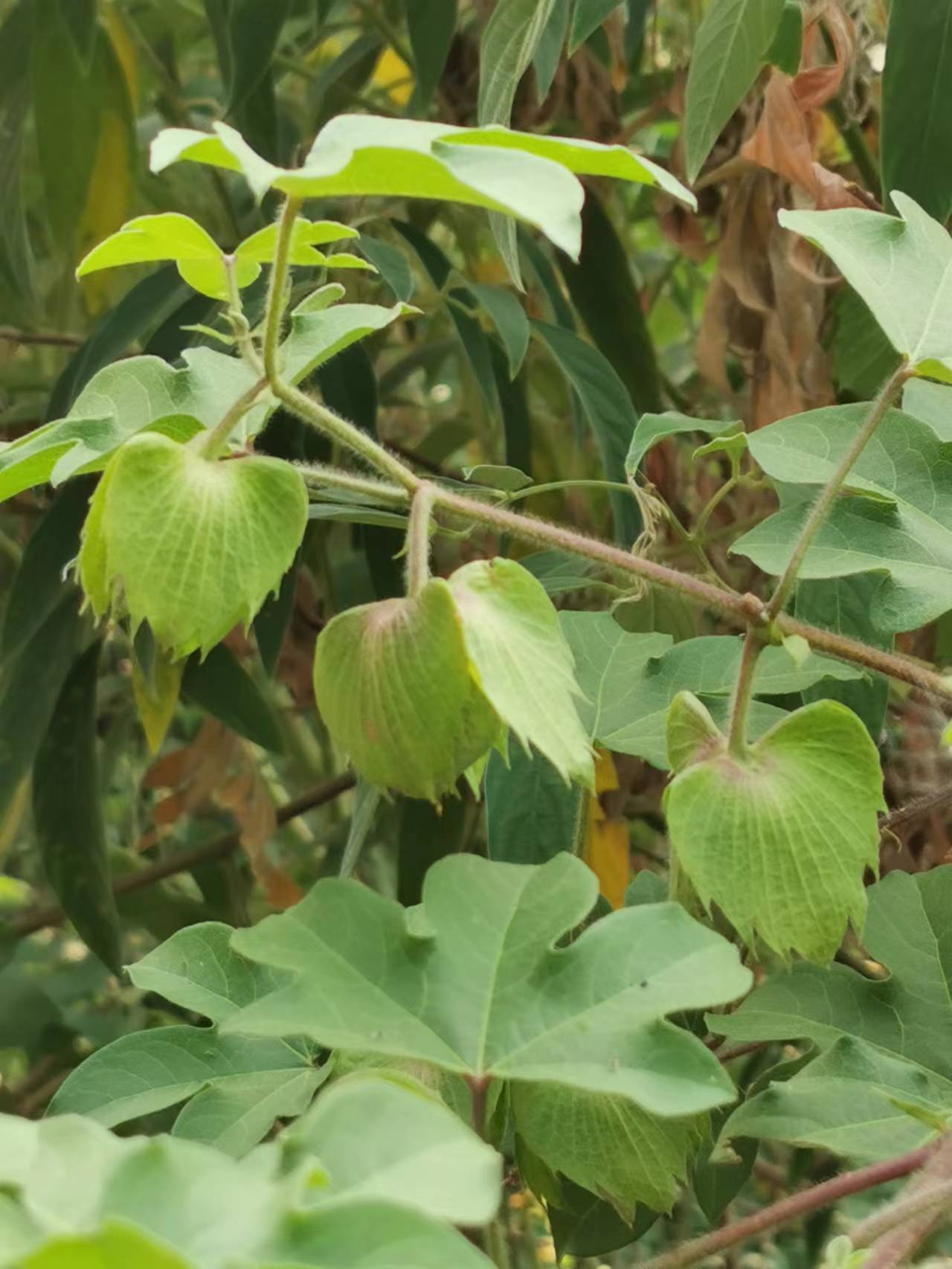
Axillary flower

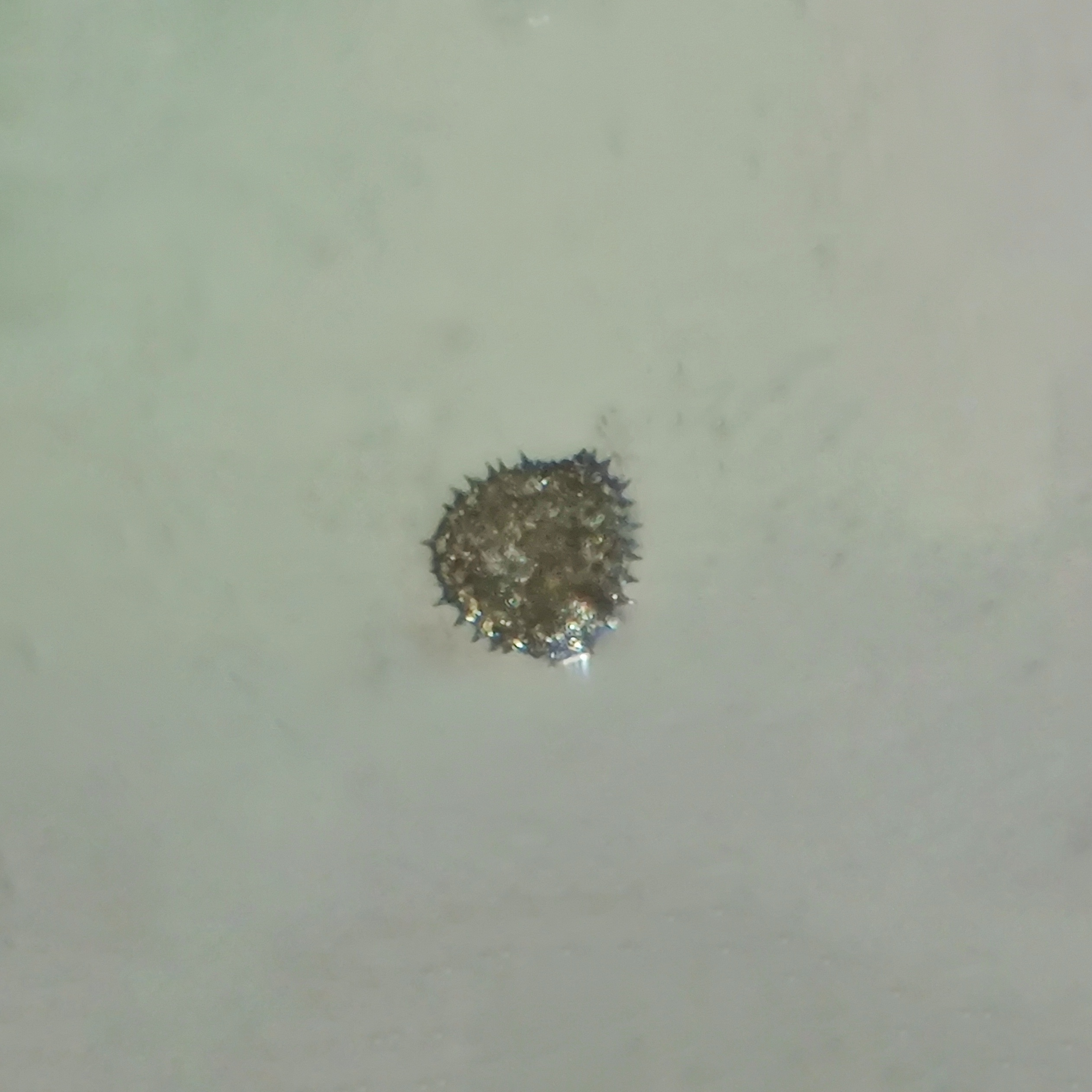
Pollen grain of Gossypium herbaceum

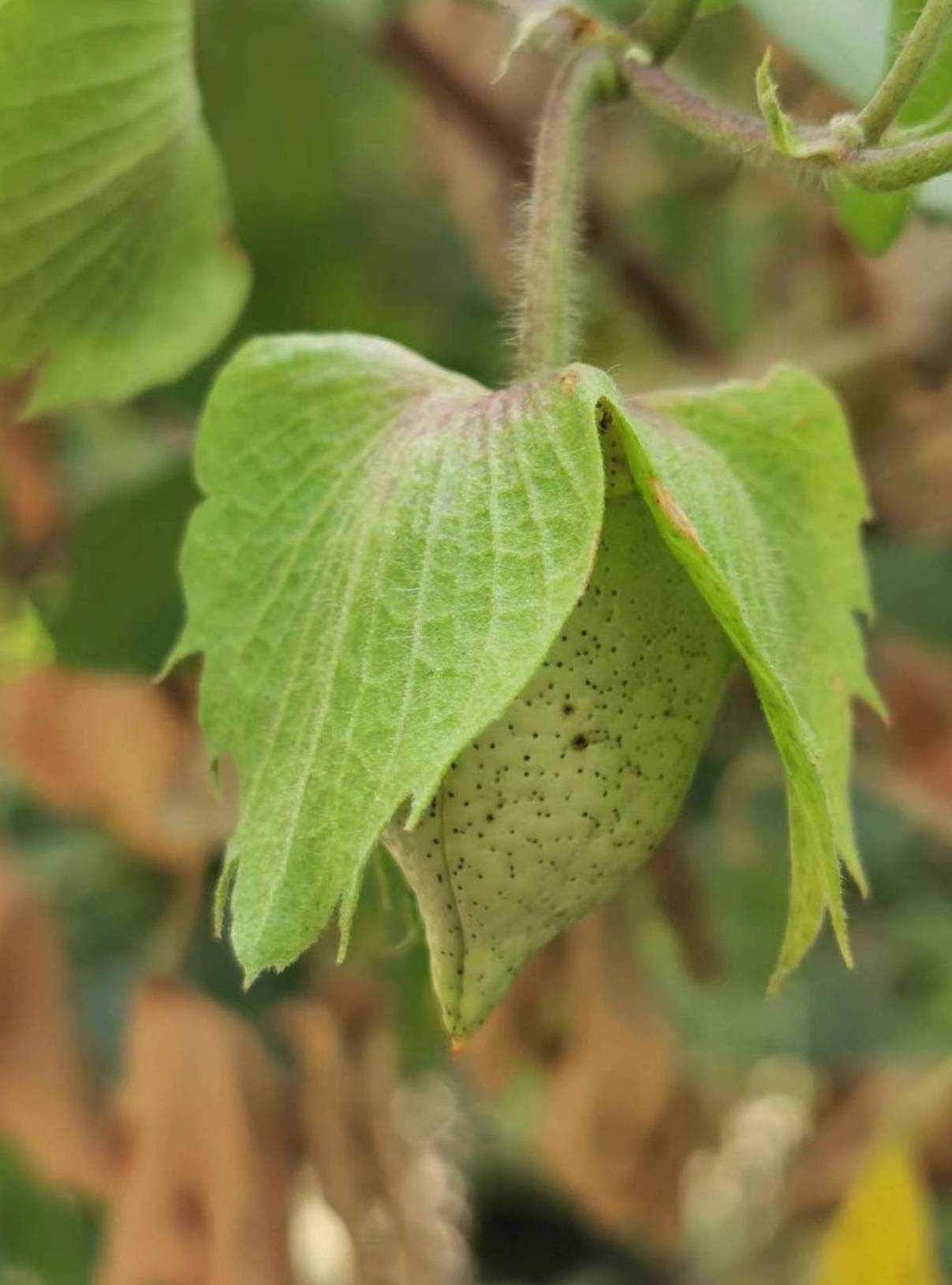
Calyx and immature fruit

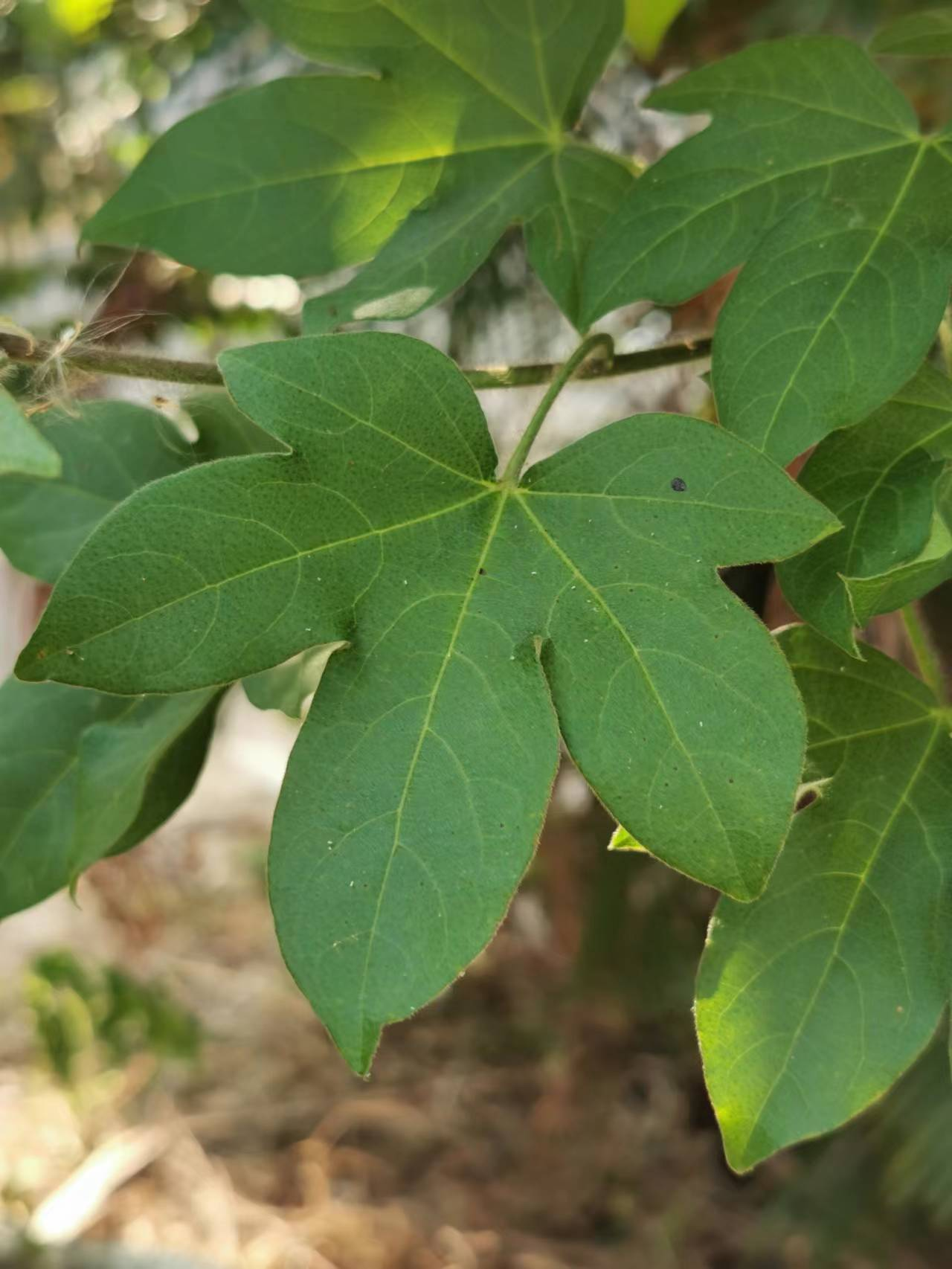
Palmate leaf

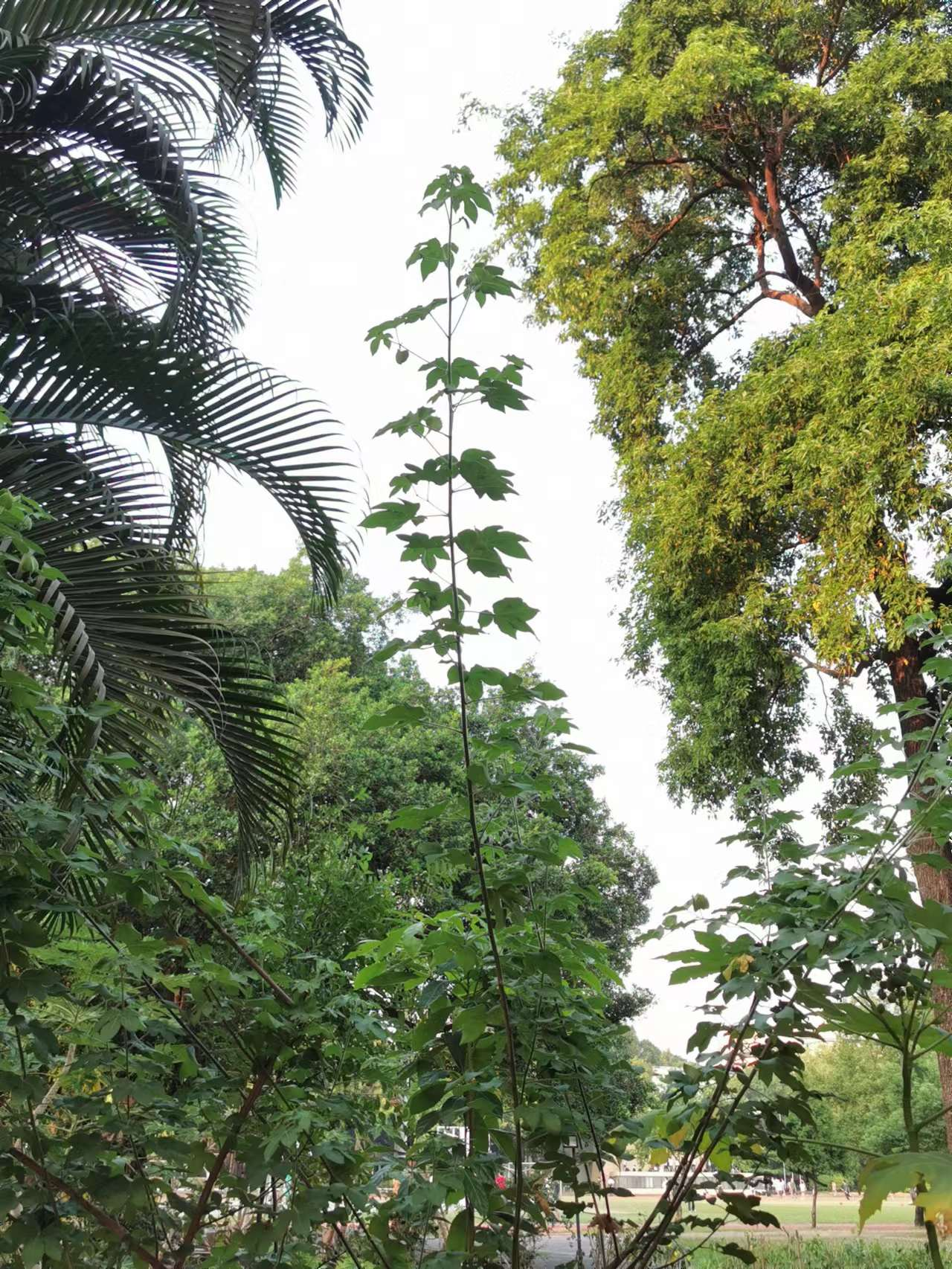
High stem

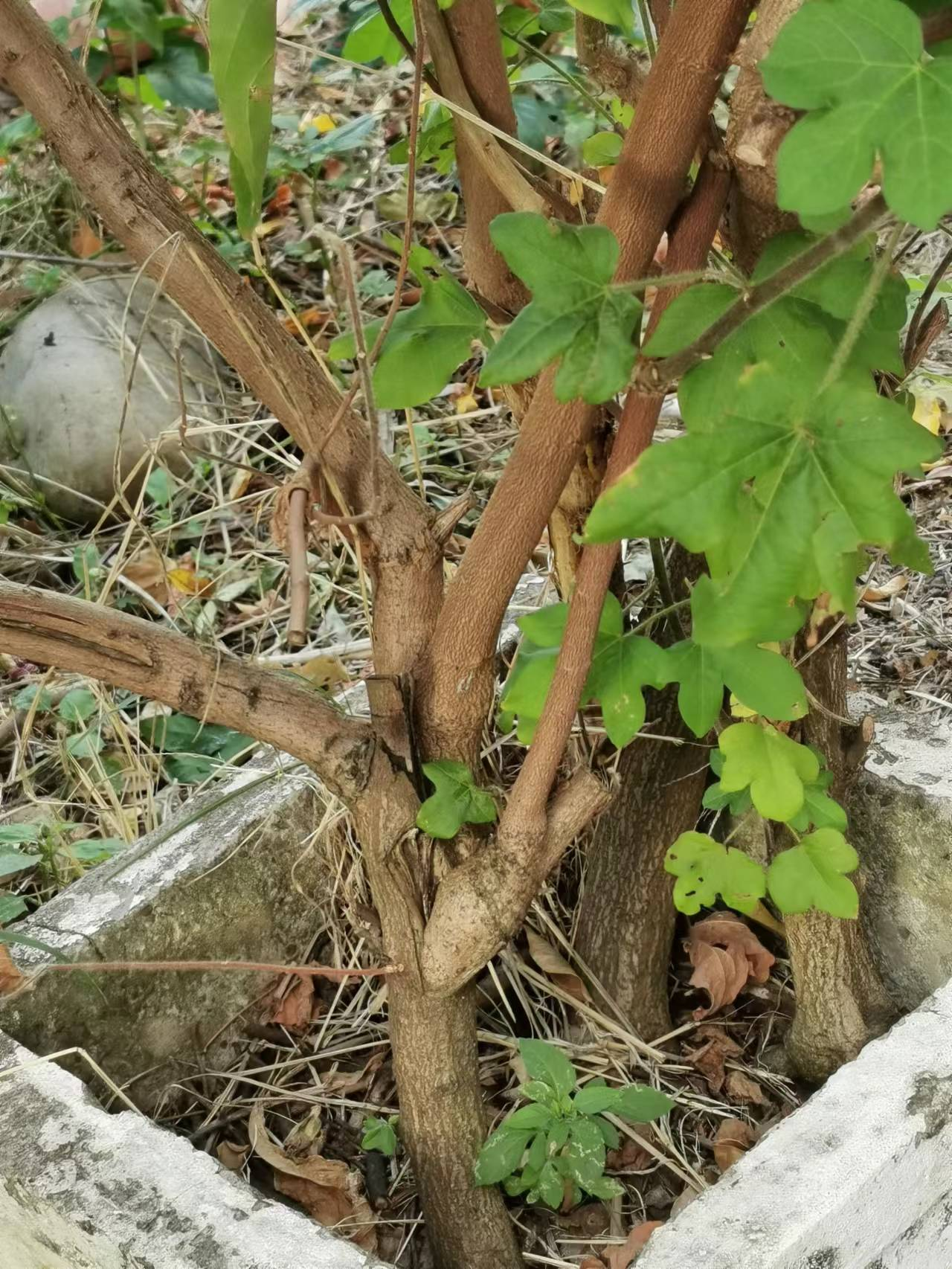
Herbs or subshrubs
