= Thaai Mookaambikai =

- DVD cover
- Directed by: K. Shankar
- Screenplay by: K. Shankar
- Story by: S. Jegadeesan
- Produced by: Sivaprasad
- Starring: K. R. Vijaya; Jaishankar; Sivakumar; Sujatha
- Cinematography: Kanchi Meenakshisundaram
- Edited by: K. Shankar; K. R. Krishnan; V. Jayabal
- Music by: Ilaiyaraaja
- Production company: Sivashankar Creations
- Release date: 9 July 1982
- Country: India
- Language: Tamil

Thaai Mookaambikai is a 1982 Indian Tamil-language devotional film directed by K. Shankar, starring K. R. Vijaya, Jaishankar, Sivakumar, Sujatha and other leading actors. The film was released on 9 July 1982.

== Plot ==
Raakayi, a woman from the oppressed community in Kollur, faces caste-based restrictions and confronts Dharma Kartha, the Kollur Mookambika Temple chief, about looting temple properties. After her death, her children - Senthil, Muthu, and Vellaiyamma are nearly killed by Dharma Kartha's men but are saved by the temple elephant, which places them in different vehicles destined to different places. Meanwhile, Poorani, the compassionate wife of the temple priest Ganesa Bhattar, is forced to leave her home after performing Raakayi's last rites, defying her husband's caste-centric views.

Years later, Kannappan, a reformed thief, learns about the history of the Kollur Mookambika temple from Ganesa Bhattar. The temple's history dates back to Adi Shankara, who prayed to Goddess Mookambika and was granted his wish to construct a shrine for her. To spot the place, the Goddess stops at a swayambhu, a self-born linga with a line cutting it in half, in which the left half represents the goddess triad - the Tridevis, and the right half represents their consorts - the male triad - the Trimurtis.

A Malaysian tourist couple shares their story of visiting the temple to cure their daughter's polio, having been directed by Senthil, who works under Durga's father and is in love with Durga. Once, Durga gets caught in the middle of the river while boating, and though Senthil has a fear of water, he rescues her. Still fainted, Senthil goes to fetch water nearby, only to get caught with native tribes of the island, where Senthil sees a look-alike of Durga and believes that she fainted to bring courage in him. But soon Senthil realizes that it was not Durga and understands the divine connection of Mookambika. Despite Durga's father accepting Senthil as his son-in-law, Durga's life is threatened by a slow poison from a snake bite. After their marriage, Durga faints due to the poison, and Senthil decides to take her to the Kollur Mookambika temple for a cure.

In Madurai, Vellaiyamma, now a housemaid, is mistreated by her employer, Ranjani, a wealthy musician. After escaping an attempted molestation by Ranjani's son Sarangan, Vellaiyamma is hit by a bus and meets Mookayi, a mysterious look-alike of Raakayi, who claims to be Raakayi's sister. Unbeknownst to Vellaiyamma, Mookayi is the Goddess in disguise. During a singing battle, Sarangan tries to sabotage Mookayi by mixing poison in Mookayi's milk, but she drinks it and fakes fainting after curing Vellaiyamma's muteness. Vellaiyamma surprisingly begins singing, but Mookayi loses her voice. Lord Shiva, in the guise of a saint, instructs Vellaiyamma to take Mookayi to Kollur to cure her muteness.

In Madras, Muthu, the younger brother, is a homeless man who is wrongly accused of murder and sentenced to death after Mani, the real culprit, tricks him into getting arrested. Kannappan, a reformed saint, meets Muthu and promises to clear his name. Meanwhile, Mani plans to marry Judge Natarajan's daughter Lakshmi, but receives a telegram summoning him to Kollur, which he hides to avoid canceling the engagement. Meanwhile, the Goddess, disguising herself as Natarajan's sister, calls from Delhi, suggesting the engagement be held at Kollur Mookambika temple. As Muthu faces execution for Mani's crime, the spirit of Azhagesan (Mani's victim) forces Mani to confess, leading to Muthu's release. Natarajan then approves Muthu's marriage to Lakshmi. However, Mani escapes prison and learns about Muthu's marriage plans in Kollur, deciding to stop it.

In Kollur, Ganesa Bhattar suffers from age-related ailments and blindness. Since Poorani is unable to visit him due to their past disagreement, she performs rituals for his health. The Goddess, in the form of Bhagavathi, taking Raakayi's form, cares for Ganesa Bhattar, helping him realize his mistakes and restoring his vision. Ganesa Bhattar reunites with Poorani after she has a dream about Raakayi. Meanwhile, the three siblings - Senthil, Vellaiyamma, and Muthu - arrive in Kollur under different circumstances. Muthu and his fiancée, Lakshmi, are stopped by Mani, who attempts to abduct Lakshmi but is thwarted by Muthu. Vellaiyamma arrives with Mookayi, seeking a cure for Mookayi's muteness. Senthil comes with his wife Durga, who is miraculously cured after visiting the temple. The siblings reunite upon seeing the unique dollar chain gifted by Poorani. Mookayi introduces them to Poorani, who is overjoyed to see Raakayi's children together again.

The film concludes with everyone searching for Mookayi. Ganesa Bhattar reveals that the Goddess had taken human form as Mookayi to reunite the separated siblings. The drunkard Dharma Kartha is seen as a mentally affected beggar, a testament to divine justice.

== Cast ==
- K. R. Vijaya as Raakayi / Mookayi / Bhagavathi / Thaai Mookambika
- Sivakumar as Senthil, Raakayi's elder son
- Saritha as Vellayamma, Raakayi's daughter
- Karthik as Muthu, Raakayi's younger son
- Major Sundarrajan as Ganesa Bhattar
- Sujatha as Annapoorani "Poorani", Bhattar's wife
- Jai Shankar as Kannappan
- Thengai Srinivasan as Dharma Kartha, Village President
- Poornima Bhagyaraj as Durga
- M. N. Nambiar as Durga's father
- Manorama as Ranjani
- Oru Viral Krishna Rao as Kaambothi
- C. K. Saraswathi as Kalyani
- Nizhalgal Ravi as Sarangan, Ranjani's son
- Jai Ganesh as Mani, Bhattar's son
- V. Gopalakrishnan as Inspector Gopi
- Gundu Kalyanam as Muthu's friend
- Gandhimathi as Ranjani's troop member
- K. Kannan as a saint in the temple
- MLA Thagaraj as Sadaiyan, Dharma Kartha's sidekick
- Idichapuli Selvaraj as Kichan, Dharma Kartha's sidekick
- M. Balamuralikrishna as a singer
- M. S. Viswanathan as a singer
- Sirkazhi Govindarajan as a singer

== Soundtrack ==
The music was composed by Ilaiyaraaja, with lyrics by Vaali. The song "Janani Janani" is set in Kalyani raga, "Isai Arasi" is set in Sallabam, also known as Surya, and the title track is set in Vasantha Sri. Ilaiyaraaja mentioned that he "was running out of time" while composing the tune for "Janani Janani". He explained that he was "under hectic pressure from the film producer, who had planned to perform the ‘puja’ for the film the next day with the song". The initial tune that Ilaiyaraaja composed did not suit the character Adi Shankara. He said that with a chance to have a glimpse of the portrait of Shankara, he was inspired to compose the tune which was similar to Bhaja Govindam. "Janani Janani" was initially to be sung by K. J. Yesudas, but Ilaiyaraaja sang the album version due to Yesudas' other commitments; his version was also selected to be used as the film version. The track “Kholapurase Kudasathrivasi” was featured in Finders Keepers Records’ compilation album titled “Solla Solla”, dedicated to Ilaiyaraaja’s compositions between 1977-1983.

Song	Singers
Isai Arasi Ennalum	P. Susheela, S. Janaki, S. Rajeswari
Janani Janani	Ilaiyaraaja, Deepan Chakravarthy
Malai Naadu	S. P. Sailaja
Pasikk Sorum Illai	P. Jayachandran
Seenathu Pattumeni	P. Susheela, Malaysia Vasudevan
Thaaye Moogambikaiye	M. Balamuralikrishna, M. S. Viswanathan, Sirkazhi Govindarajan, S. Janaki

"Janani Janani” Song:

Sivah Shaktya Yukto Yadi Bhavati Shaktah Prabhavitum

Na Setevam Devo Na Kalu Kushalah Spandhitumapi
Ah Adastvam Aradhyam Hari Hara Virinsadhipi Rabi
Pranantum Stotum Va Kathamakrut Punya Prabhavati Ah
Janani Janani Jagam Nee Agham Nee
Janani Janani Jagam Nee Agham Nee

Jagat Karani Nee Paripoorni Nee !

Saundarya Lahari has been used in the “Janani Janani” song. The song holds an important place in conveying divine philosophy to the general public through music. explains that the world functions only when Shiva and Shakti are united. This philosophical idea is expressed simply and emotionally in the song “Janani Janani”. The film was created focusing on the deity Mookaambikai, who plays the role of the mother. The music for this song was composed by Ilaiyaraaja, and the lyrics were written by Vaali.

The first verse of Soundariya Lahari was composed by Adi Shankaracharya. It Shakti is described as the fundamental cause of the universe and the force that moves everything. Even the gods attain completeness only through Shakti’s grace. The Mother is seen both as the world and as the soul. This concept forms the core of the Shakti philosophy in Soundariya Lahari.

It is stated both that the Mother is the fundamental power of the world and that divine power manifests as the Mother. The philosophical idea of the unity of Shiva and Shakti, expressed in Soundariya Lahari, is presented in the film song in an emotionally resonant motherly form that the general public can easily connect with. The Mother is described as the cause of the universe and the one who completes everything. The profound ideas in the philosophical text are expressed in the film song in a way that touches people’s hearts through the emotional form of the Mother.

== Release and reception ==
Thaai Mookaambikai was released on 9 July 1982. Thiraignani of Kalki felt the audience who expected to watch the history of goddess Mookambika and the stories of their devotees will feel disappointed panning certain subplots. He however praised Jagadeesan's dialogues and Karthik's performance and concluded the film's director K. Shankar is responsible for the crime of not seeing completion in Darshan.

== Bibliography ==
- Sundararaman (2007) [2005]. Raga Chintamani: A Guide to Carnatic Ragas Through Tamil Film Music (2nd ed.). Pichhamal Chintamani. OCLC 295034757.
