= Temple car =

Vehicle carrying representation of Hindu god(s)

Temple car procession during Thanjavur Chariot festival decorated with Thombais, Tamil Nadu.

Temple cars or Temple chariots (Tamil:திருத்தேர்) romanized tiruttēr are used to carry representations of Hindu deities around the streets of a temple on festival days. These chariots are generally manually pulled by the devotees of the deity, or by the priests and other staff of the temple.

As of 2004, the Indian state Tamil Nadu had 515 wooden carts, 79 of which needed repairs. Annamalaiyar Temple, Tiruvannamalai, Chidambaram Natarajar Temple are among the temples that possess these huge wooden chariots for regular processions.

The Natarajar Temple, in Tamil Nadu, India, celebrates the chariot festival twice a year; once in the summer (Aani Thirumanjanam, which takes place between June and July) and another in winter (Marghazhi Thiruvaadhirai, which takes place between December and January). Lord Krishna of Udupi has five temple cars, namely Brahma ratha (the largest), Madya ratha (medium), kinyo (small), and the silver and gold rathas.

The Jagannath Rath Yatra is a grand festival celebrated annually in Puri, Odisha. The festival commemorates the ceremonial journey of Lord Jagannath, his brother Balabhadra, and his sister Subhadra from the main Jagannath Temple to the Gundicha Temple in massive wooden chariots.

The size of the largest temple cars inspired the Anglo-Indian term Juggernaut (from Jagannath), signifying a tremendous, virtually unstoppable force or phenomenon.

== History ==
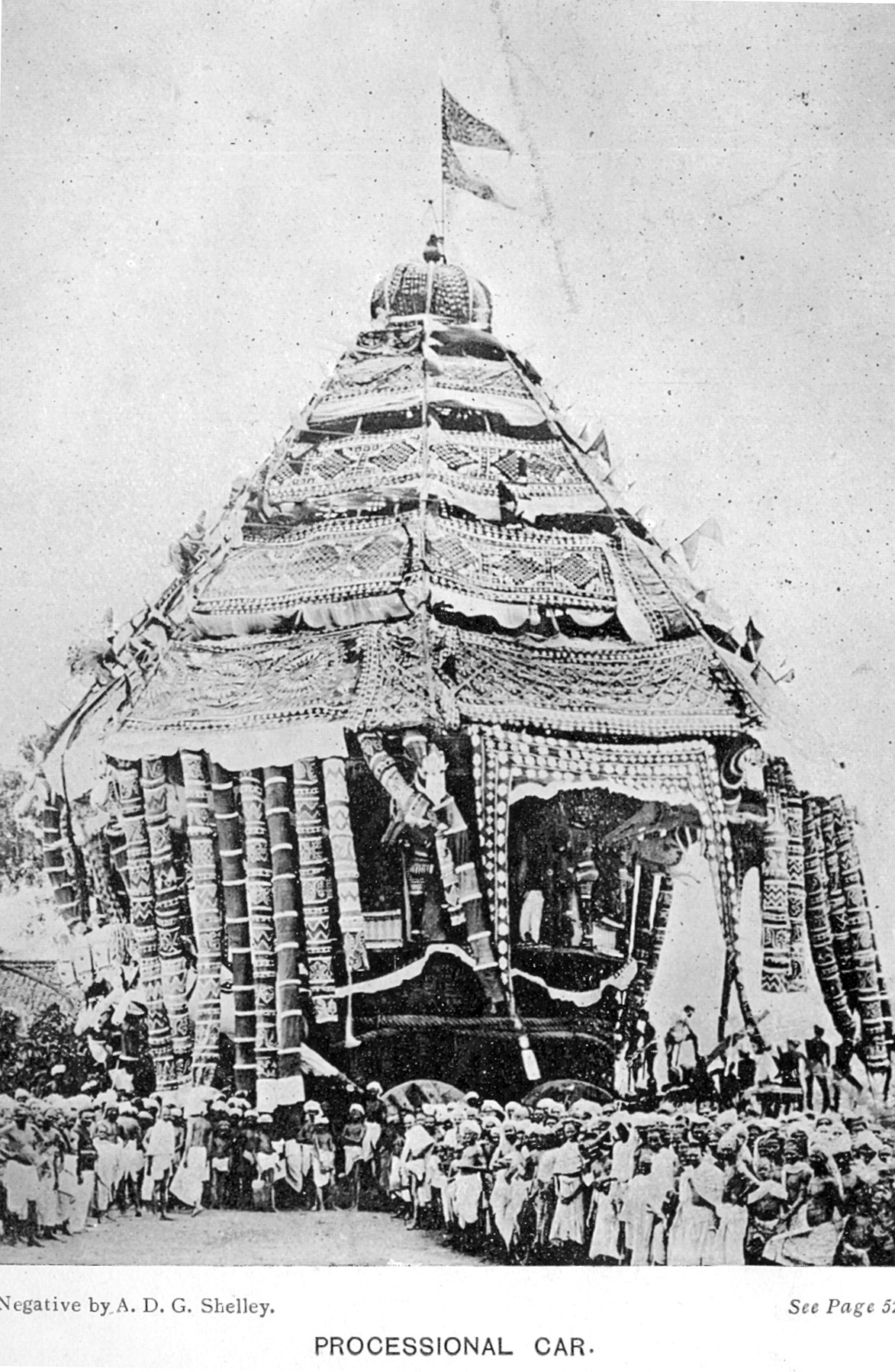
Tiruvadmarudur Temple chariot in 1913.

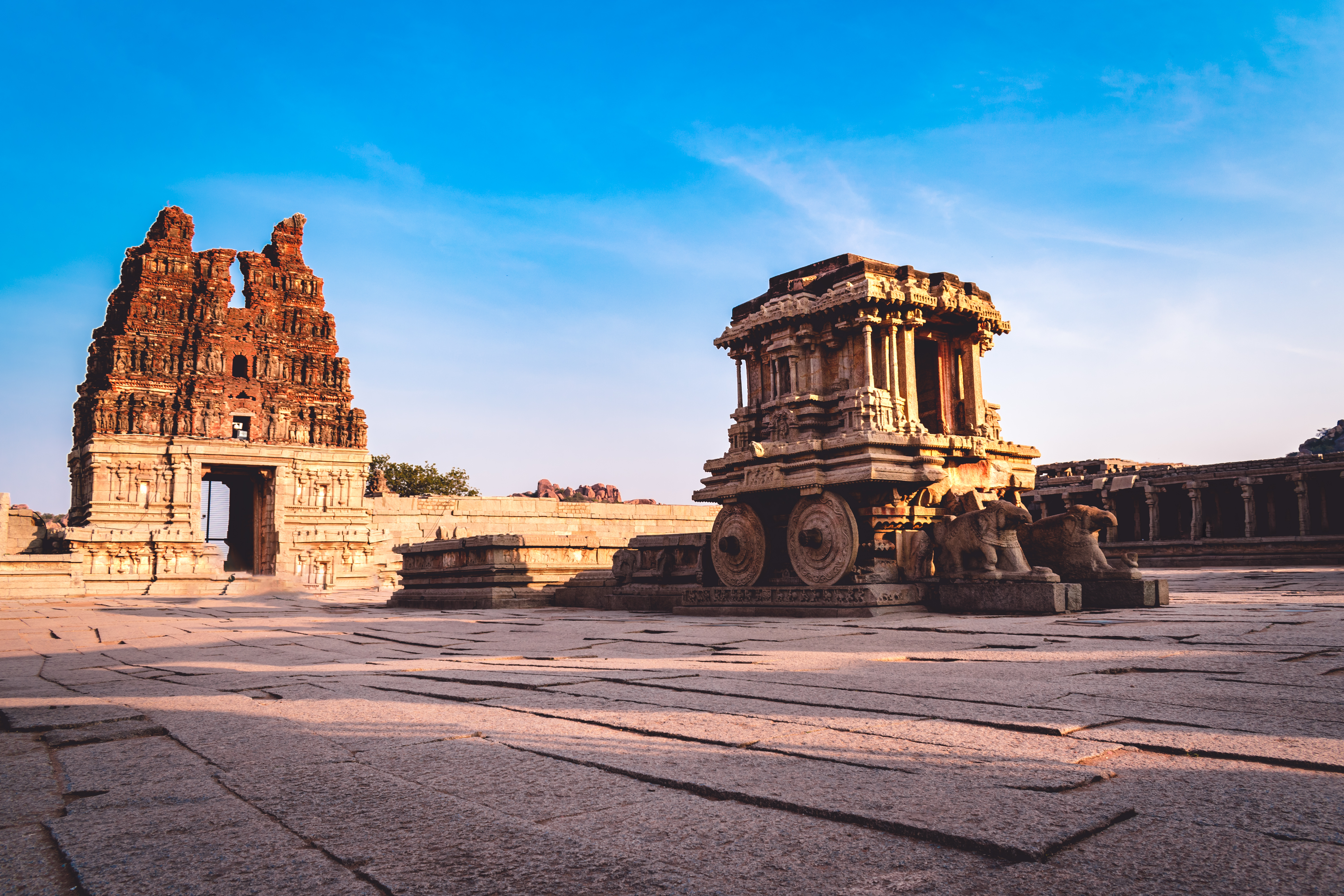
Stone temple car in the Vitthala Temple built during Vijayanagara Empire, India.

Temple cars are used during festivals called Ratha Yatra or Rath Yatra is a procession in a chariot accompanied by the public. It typically refers to a procession (journey) of deities, people dressed like deities, or simply religious saints and political leaders. The term appears in medieval texts of India such as the Puranas, which mention the Ratha Yatra of Surya (Sun god), of Devi (Mother goddess), and of Vishnu. These chariot journeys have elaborate celebrations where the individuals or the deities come out of a temple accompanied by the public journeying with them through the Ksetra (region, streets) to another temple or to the river or the sea. Sometimes the festivities include returning to the sacrosanctum of the temple.

Traveler Fa-Hien who visited India during 400 CE notes the way temple car festivals were celebrated in India.

The cities and towns of this country [Magadha] are the greatest of all in the Middle Kingdom [Mathura through Deccan]. The inhabitants are rich and prosperous, and vie with one another in the practice of benevolence and righteousness. Every year on the eighth day of the second month they celebrate a procession of images. They make a four-wheeled car, and on it erect a structure of four storeys by means of bamboos tied together. This is supported by a king-post, with poles and lances slanting from it, and is rather more than twenty cubits high, having the shape of a tope. White and silk-like cloth of hair is wrapped all round it, which is then painted in various colours. They make figures of devas, with gold, silver, and lapis lazuli grandly blended and having silken streamers and canopies hung out over them. On the four sides are niches, with a Buddha seated in each, and a Bodhisattva standing in attendance on him. There may be twenty cars, all grand and imposing, but each one different from the others. On the day mentioned, the monks and laity within the borders all come together; they have singers and skillful musicians; they pay their devotion with flowers and incense. The Brahmans come and invite the Buddhas to enter the city. These do so in order, and remain two nights in it. All through the night they keep lamps burning, have skillful music, and present offerings. This is the practice in all the other kingdoms as well. The Heads of the Vaisya families in them establish in the cities houses for dispensing charity and medicines. All the poor and destitute in the country, orphans, widowers, and childless men, maimed people and cripples, and all who are diseased, go to those houses, and are provided with every kind of help, and doctors examine their diseases. They get the food and medicines which their cases require, and are made to feel at ease; and when they are better, they go away of themselves.

— Faxian, c. 415 CE

== Early photographs and lithography of temple chariots ==
Vintage Temple chariot procession pictures

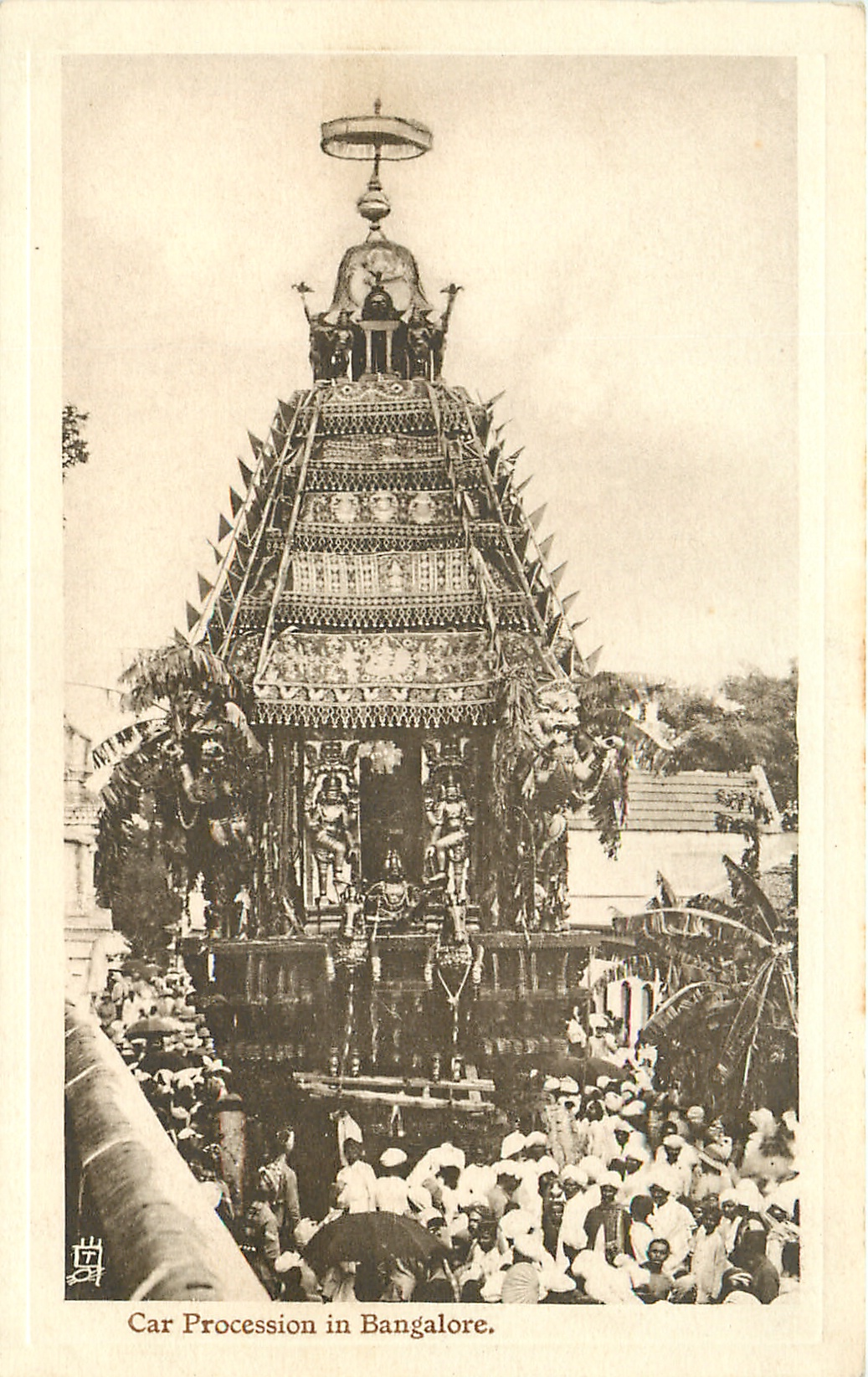
Someshwara Temple chariot in 1918.

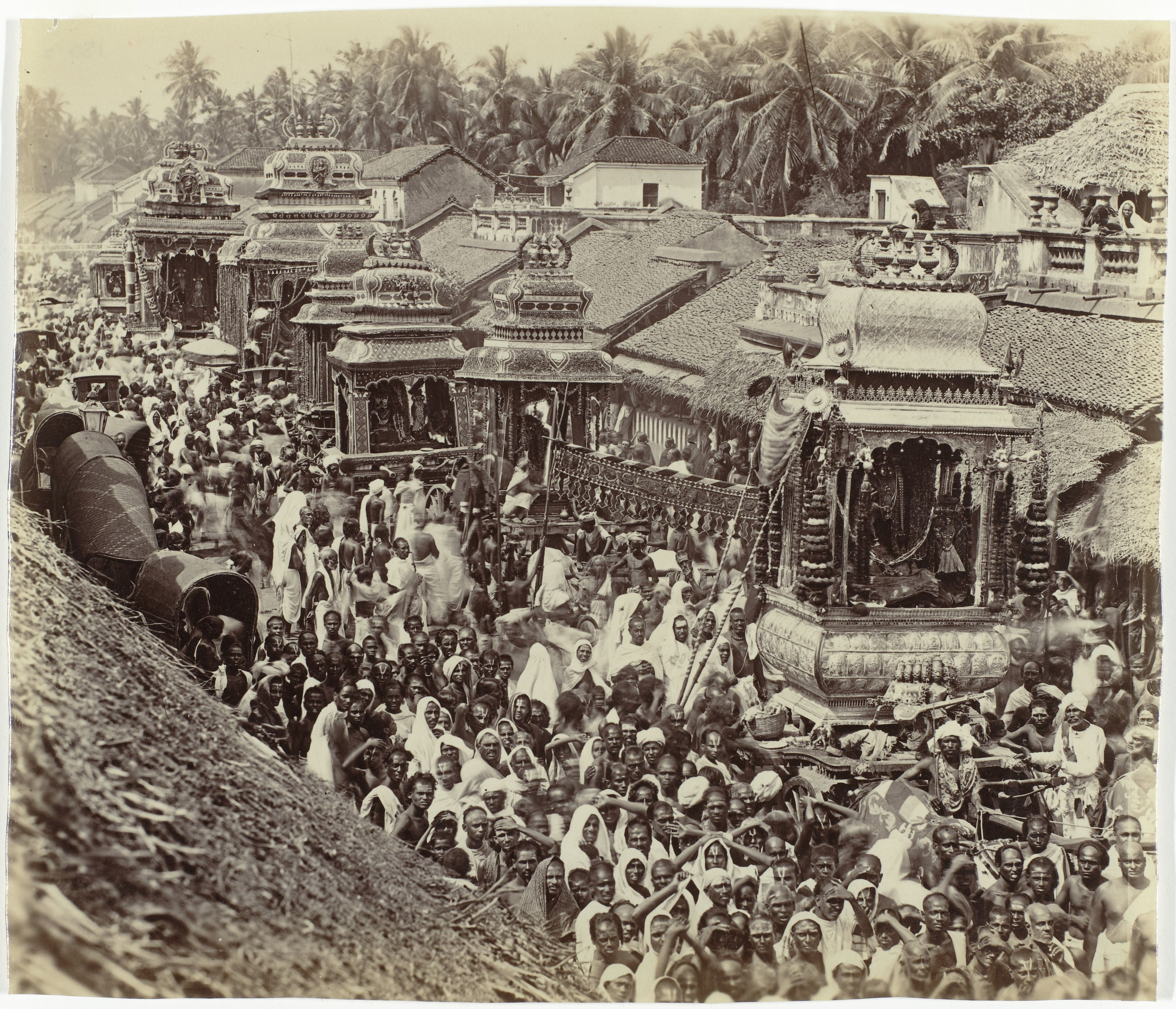
Chariot procession in Madurai in 1872.

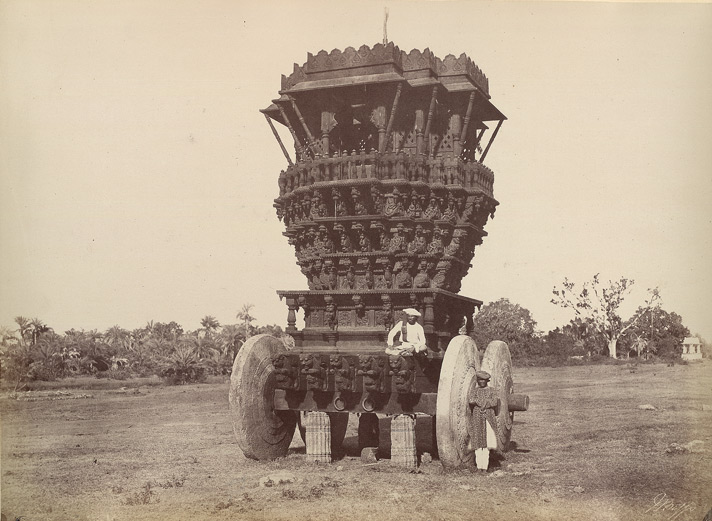
Banashankari Temple (Badami) chariot in 1855.

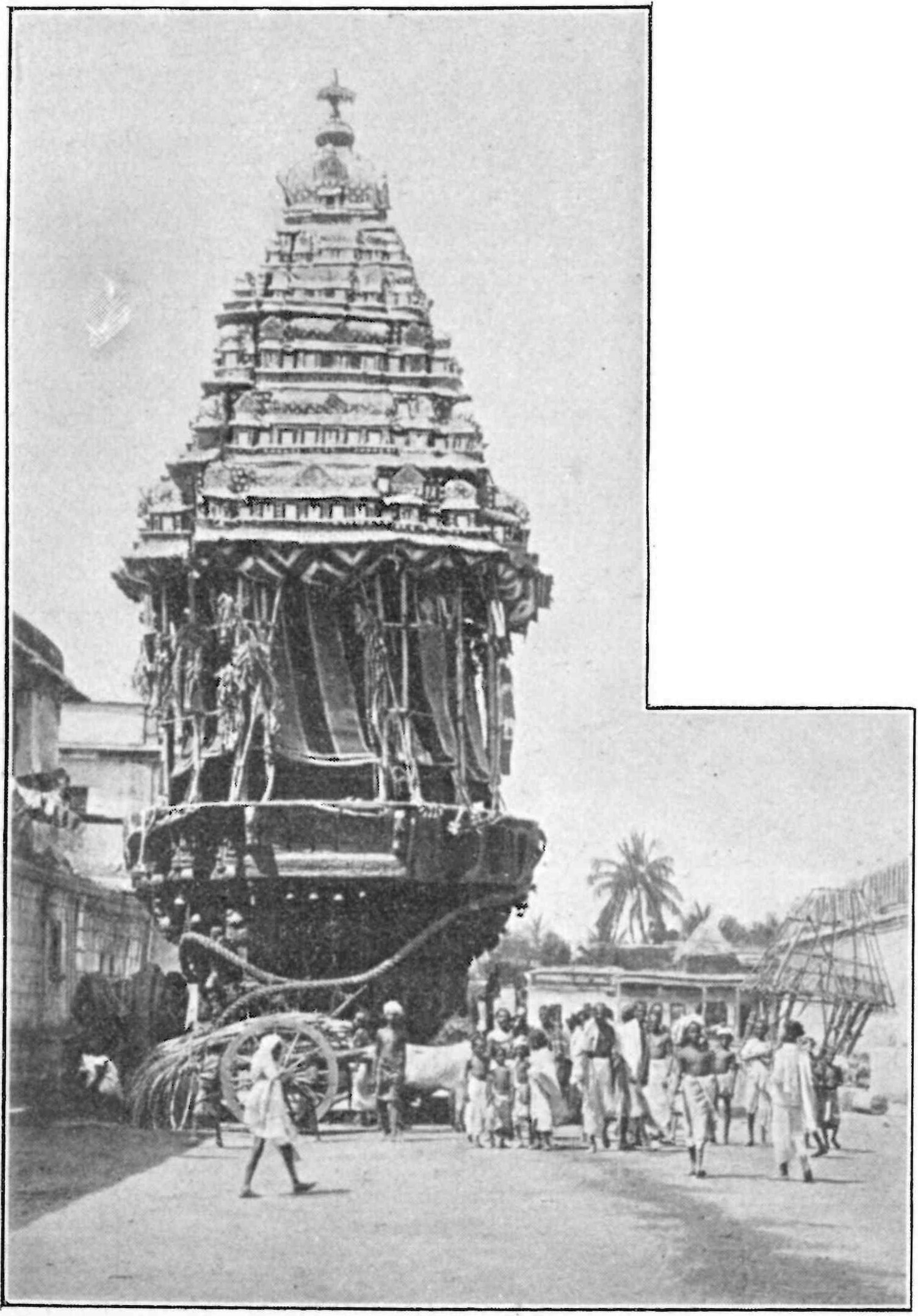
Srirangam Temple chariot in the 1890s.

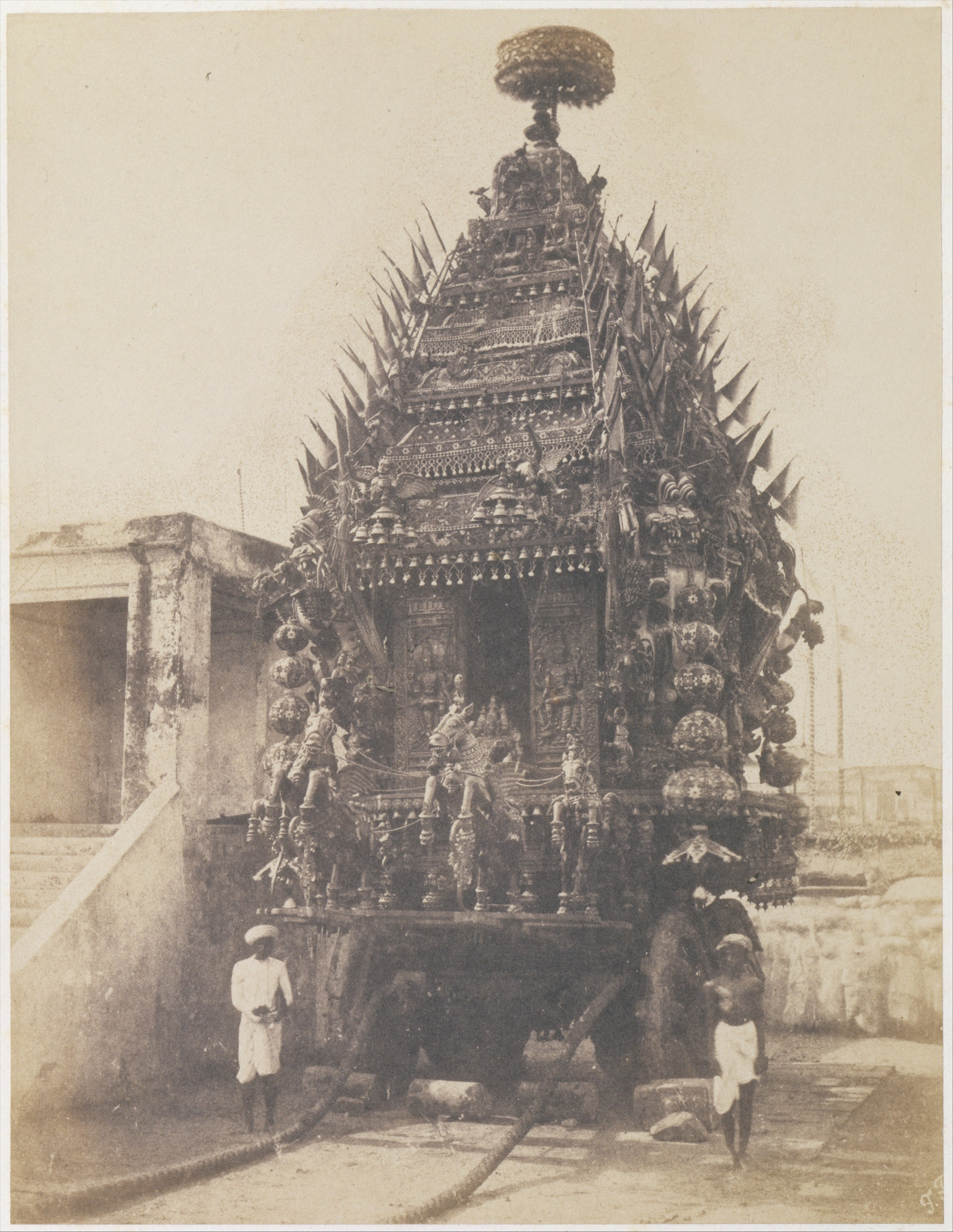
Juggernaut Car, Madras, 1850.

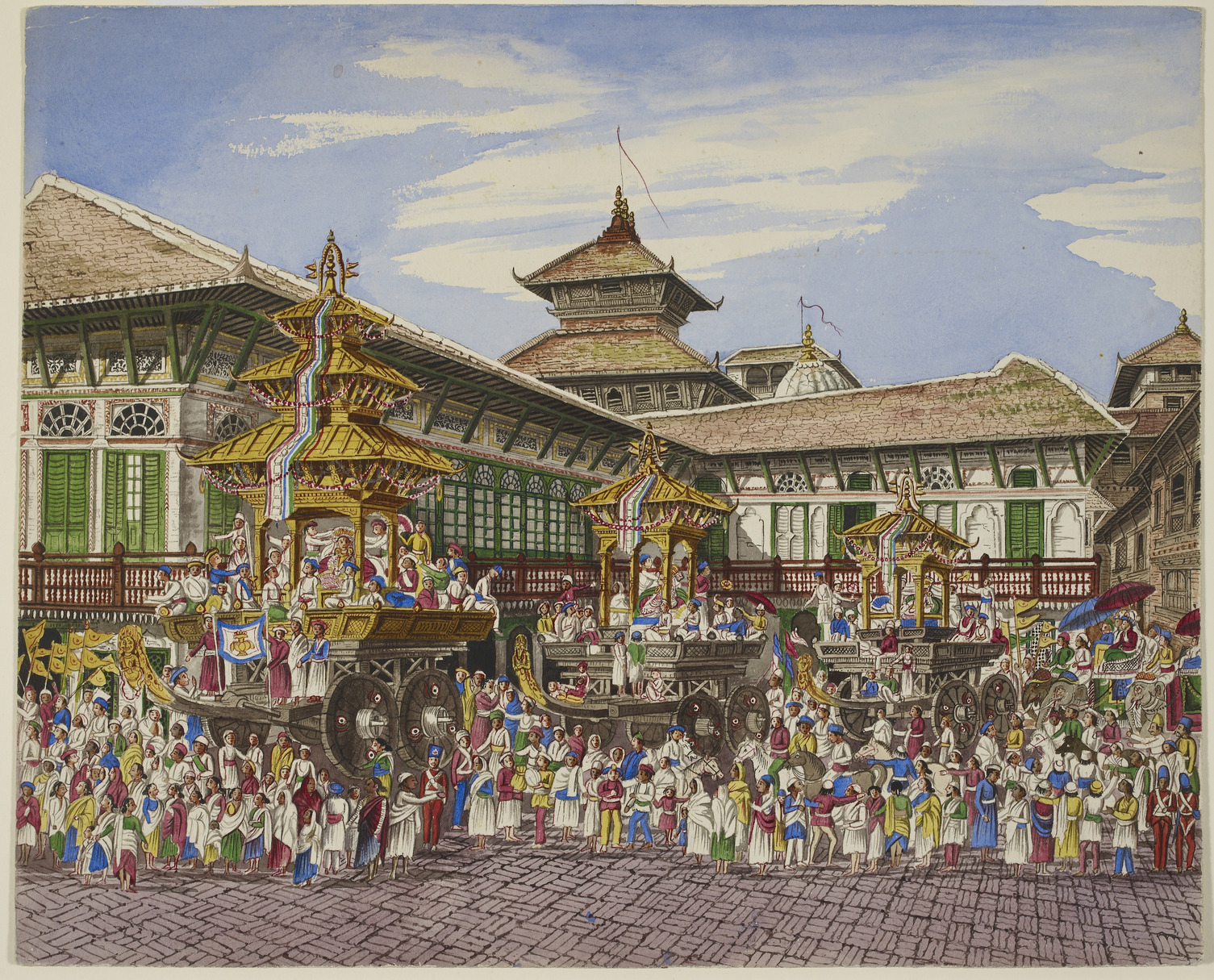
Three temple cars outside the Hanuman Dhoka, or Old Palace, Kathmandu - Oldfield collection (1850-1863)

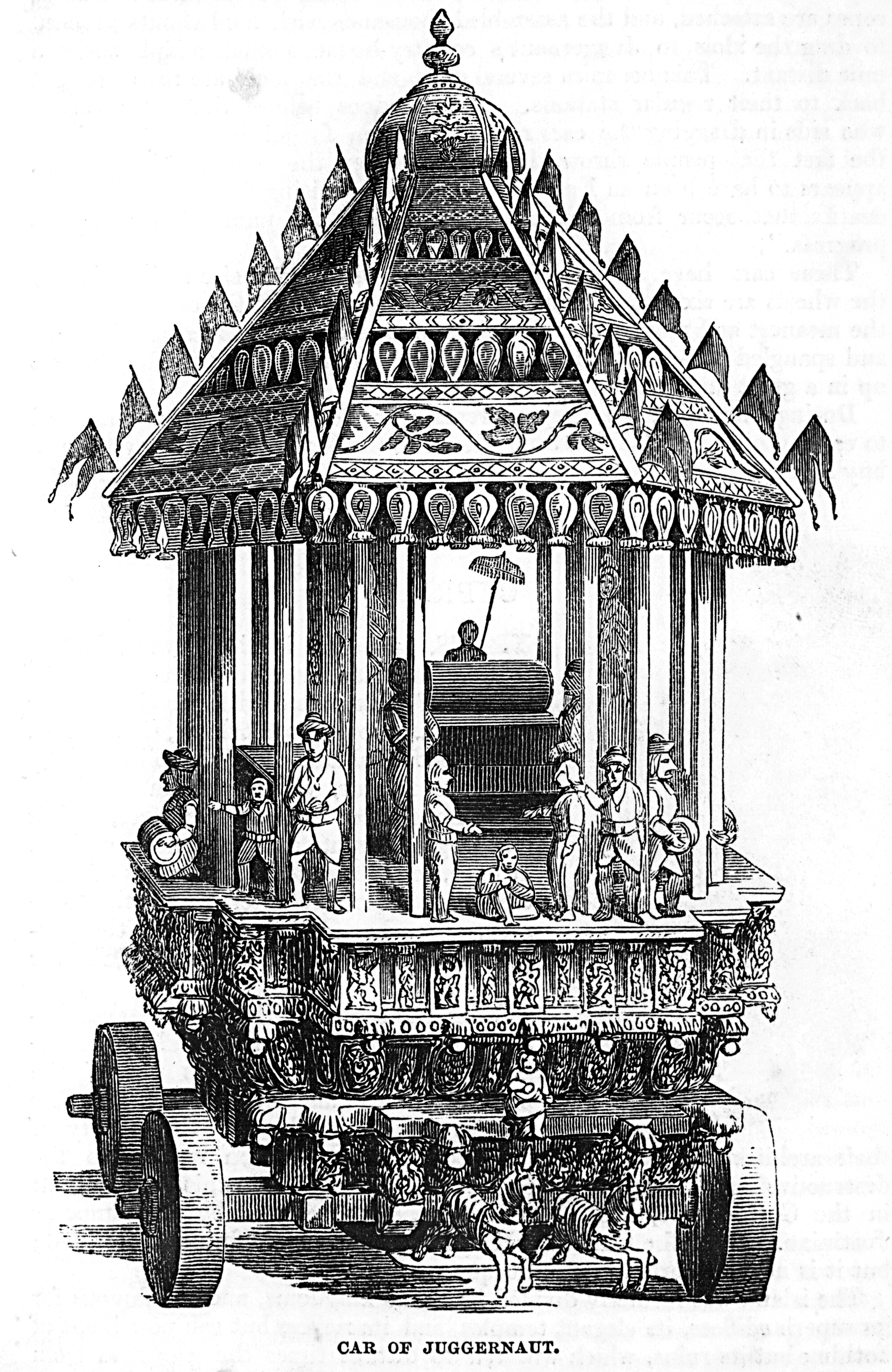
The Car of Juggernaut, as depicted in the 1851 Illustrated London Reading Book

Temple car in Bangalore, 1870

== Largest temple chariot ==
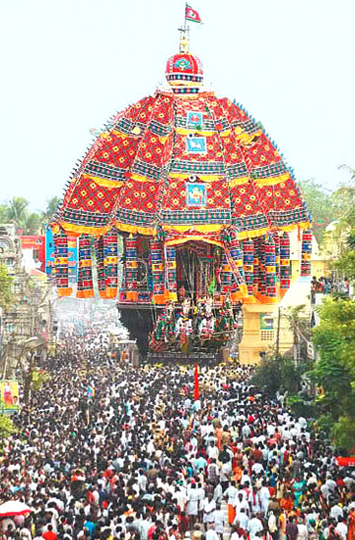
Asia's Largest Temple car "Aazhi Ther (Big Chariot)" in Thiruvarur, Tamil Nadu.

The procession of the Asia's largest and greatest temple car of Thiruvarur Thiyagarajar Temple in Tamil Nadu features prominently in an ancient festival held in the town. The annual chariot festival of the Thygarajaswamy temple is celebrated during April – May, corresponding to the Tamil month of Chitrai. The chariot is the largest of its kind in Asia and India weighing 300 tons with a height of 90 feet. The chariot comes around the four main streets surrounding the temple during the festival. The event is attended by lakhs of people from all over Tamil Nadu.

The Aazhi Ther is the biggest temple chariot in Tamil Nadu. The 30-foot tall temple car, which originally weighed 220 tons, is raised to 96 feet with bamboo sticks and decorative clothes, taking its total weight to 350 tons. Mounted on the fully decorated temple car, the presiding deity – Lord Shiva – went around the four streets with the devotees pulling it using huge ropes. Two bulldozers were engaged to provide the required thrust so that devotees could move the chariot.

== Tallest temple chariot ==
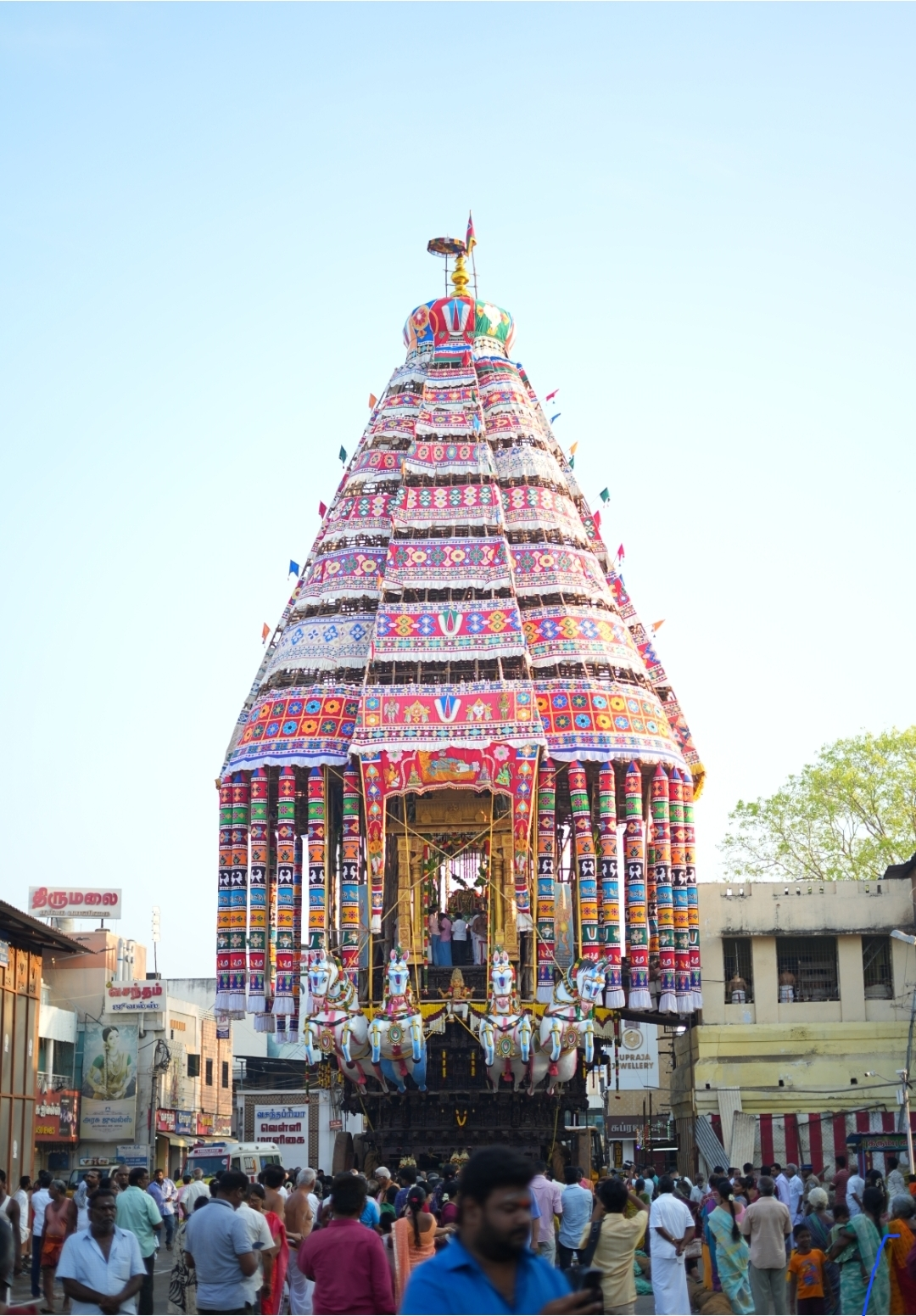
Tamil Nadu’s Tallest Temple Chariot at Sarangapani Temple, Kumbakonam, Tamil Nadu.

The grand temple chariot of Sarangapani Temple in Kumbakonam, Tamil Nadu, is regarded as the tallest temple chariot in Tamil Nadu. It stands at a height of 118 feet and weighs around 500 tons, making it one of the heaviest wooden temple chariots in India. The annual chariot festival of the temple is celebrated during the Tamil month of Chithirai, attracting devotees from across the state. Mounted on the temple car, the presiding deity – Lord Sarangapani Perumal – is taken in a procession around the four Raja Veedhis surrounding the temple. Devotees pull the chariot using ropes amidst traditional music, chanting, and celebrations. Due to the size and weight of the ther, 3 bulldozers and 1 crane are engaged to provide the required thrust, balance, and movement for the smooth procession of the temple chariot through the streets of Kumbakonam.

== Gallery ==
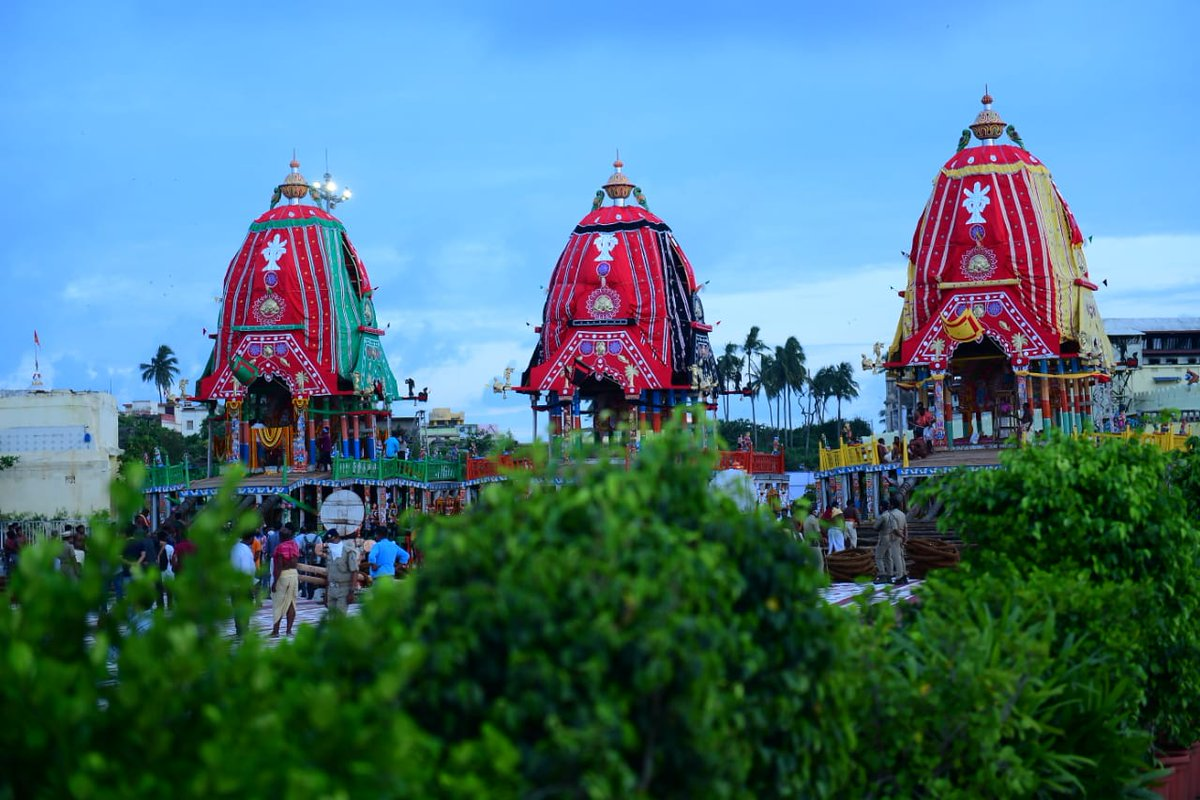
Taladhwaja, Darpadalana and Nandighosha in 2021 Ratha Jatra, Odisha, India.

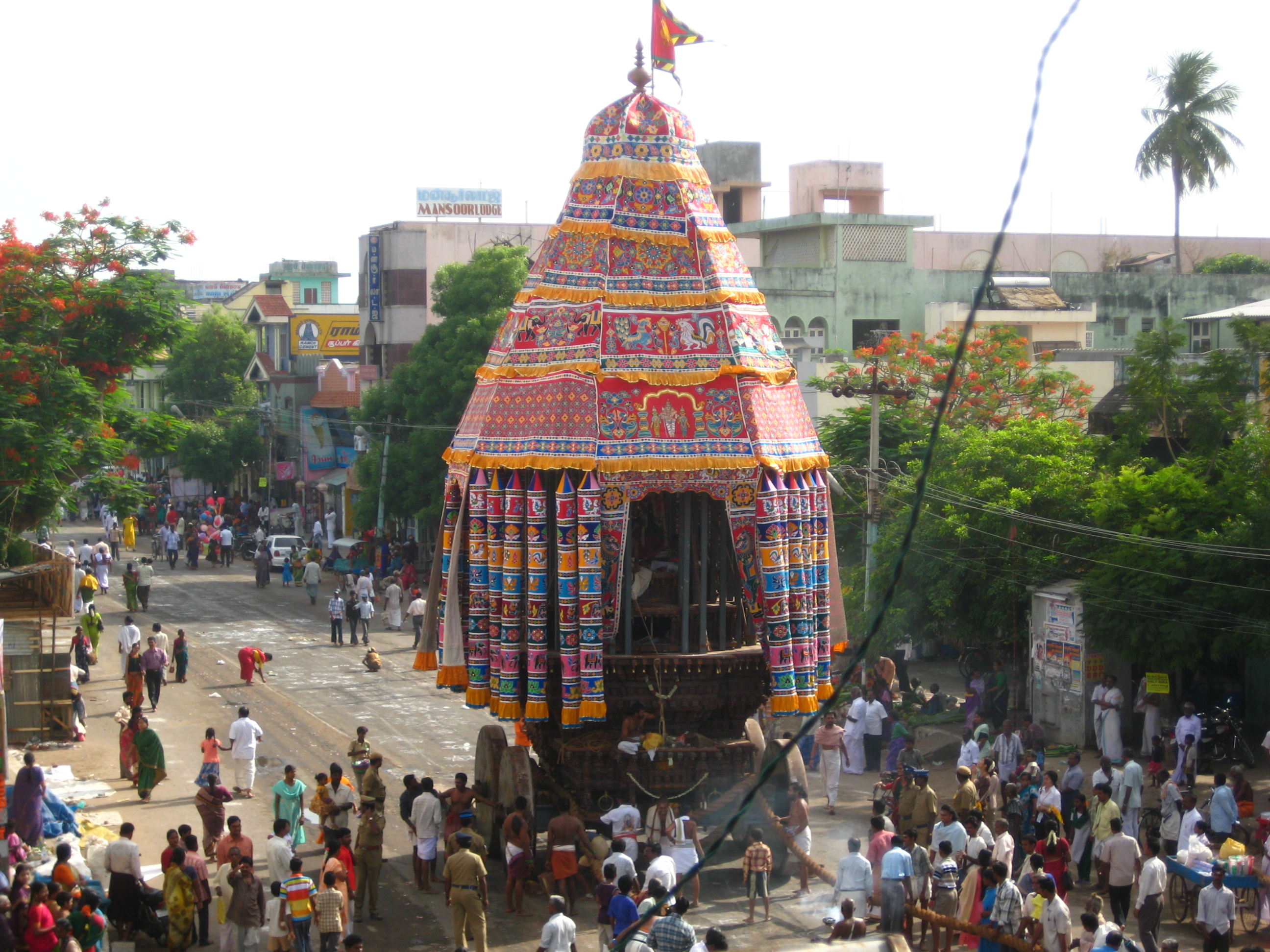
Temple festival in Chidambaram, Tamil Nadu, India.

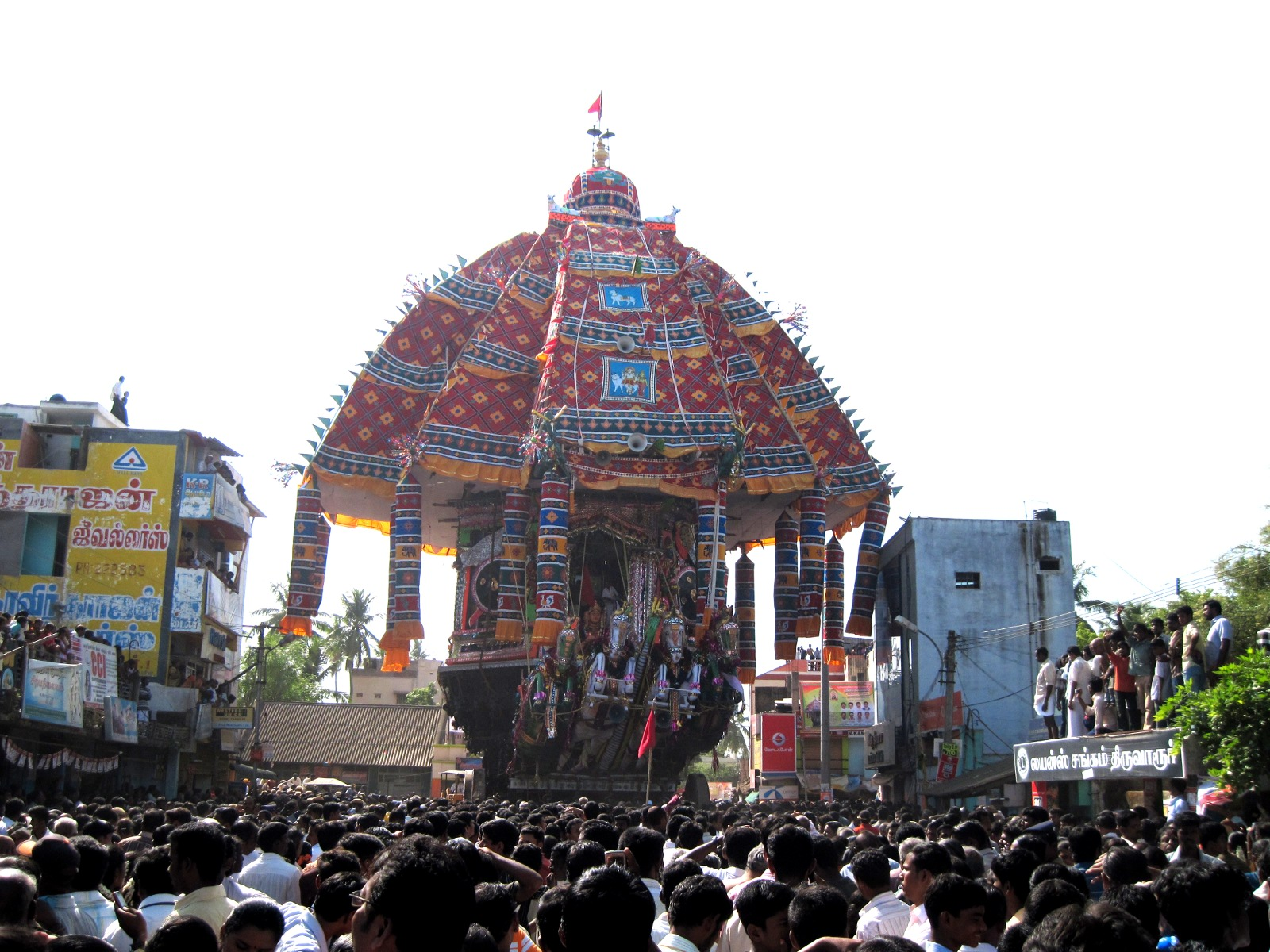
Tiruvarur temple car, the largest (chariot) temple car in the world, it weighing 300 tonnes (295 long tons; 331 short tons) with a height of 90 feet (27.43 m).

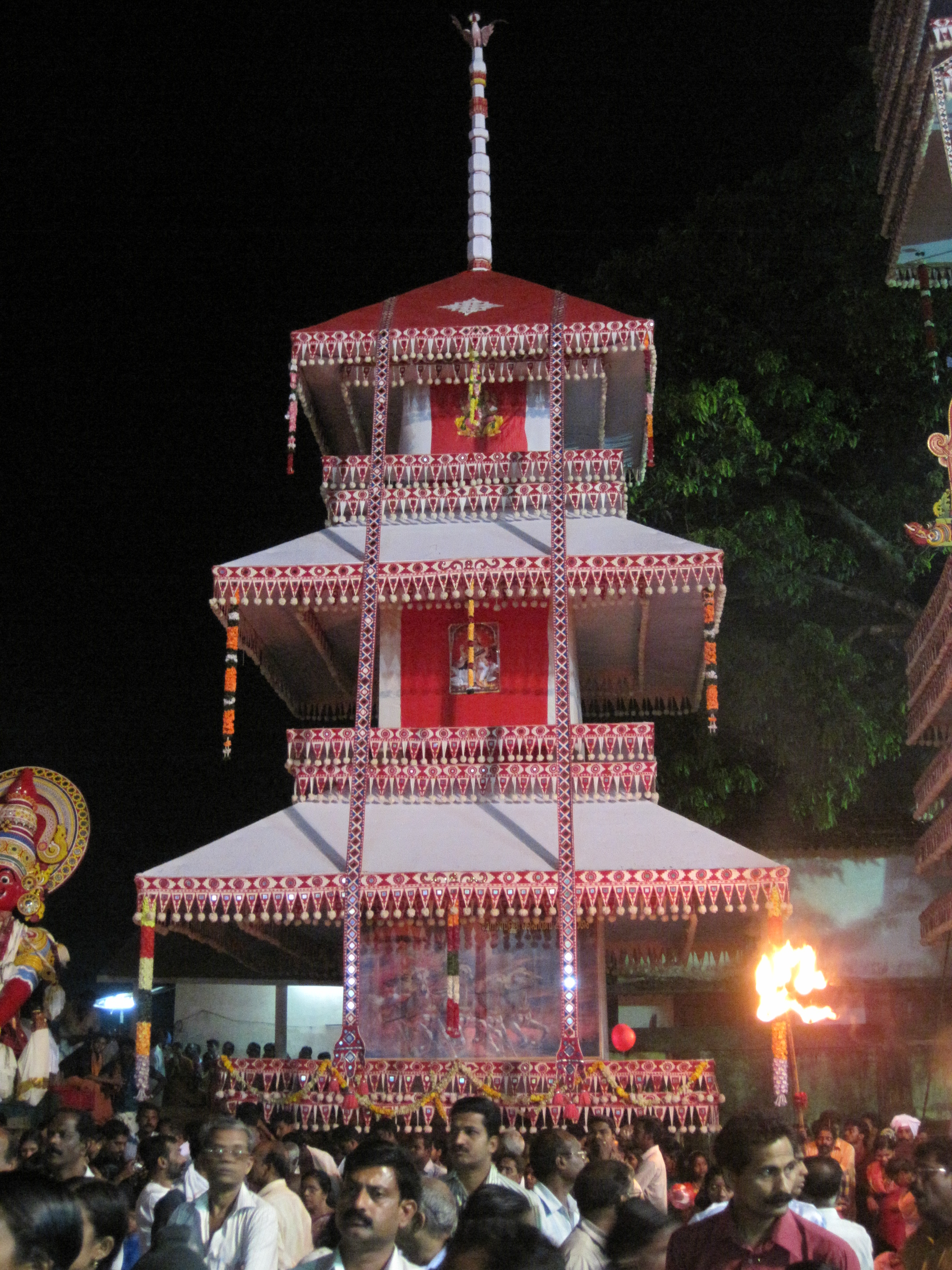
Type of temple car called Theru from the Chettikulangara Kumbha Bharani, Kerala

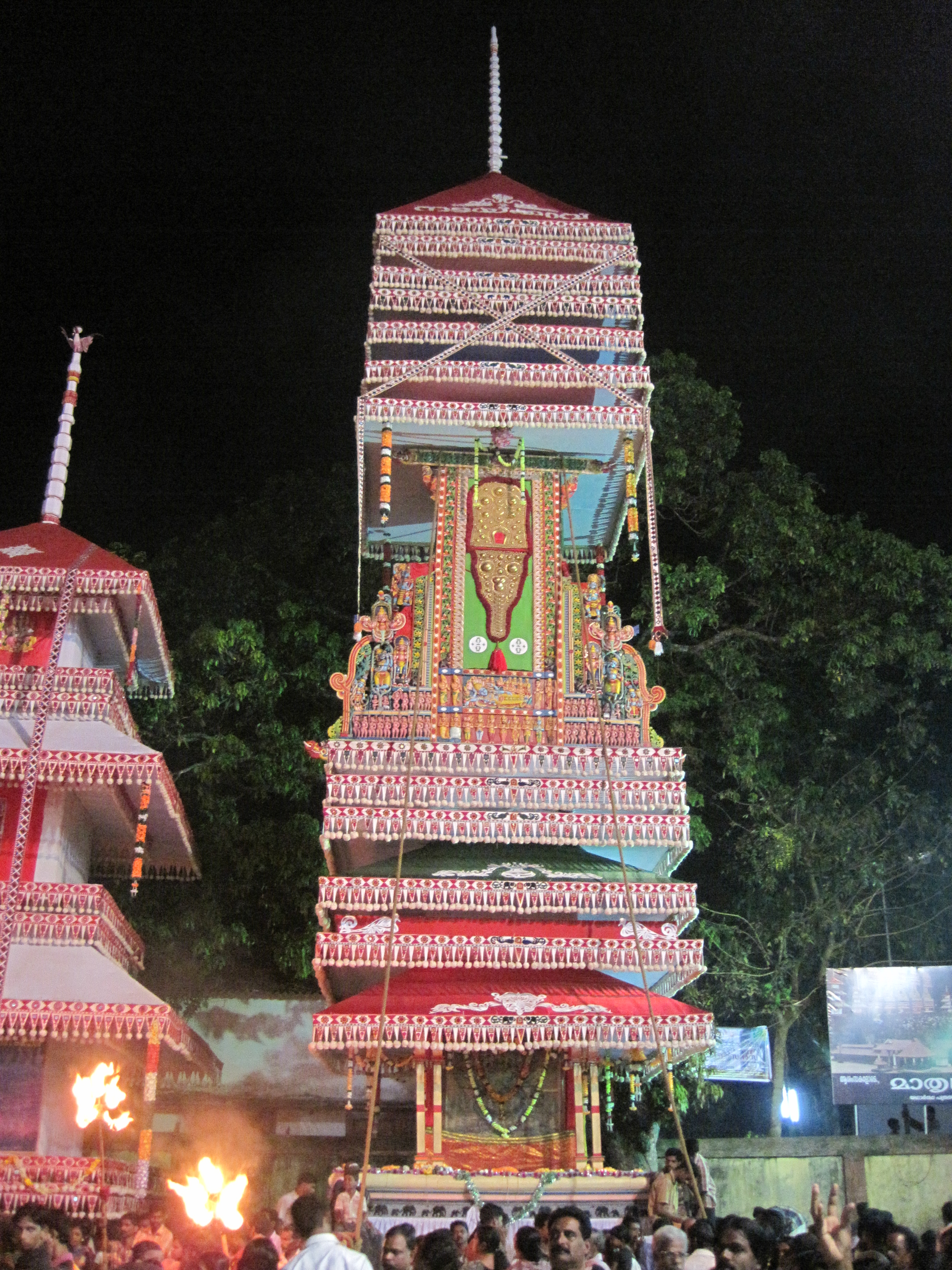
Type of temple car called Kuthira from the Chettikulangara Kumbha Bharani, Kerala

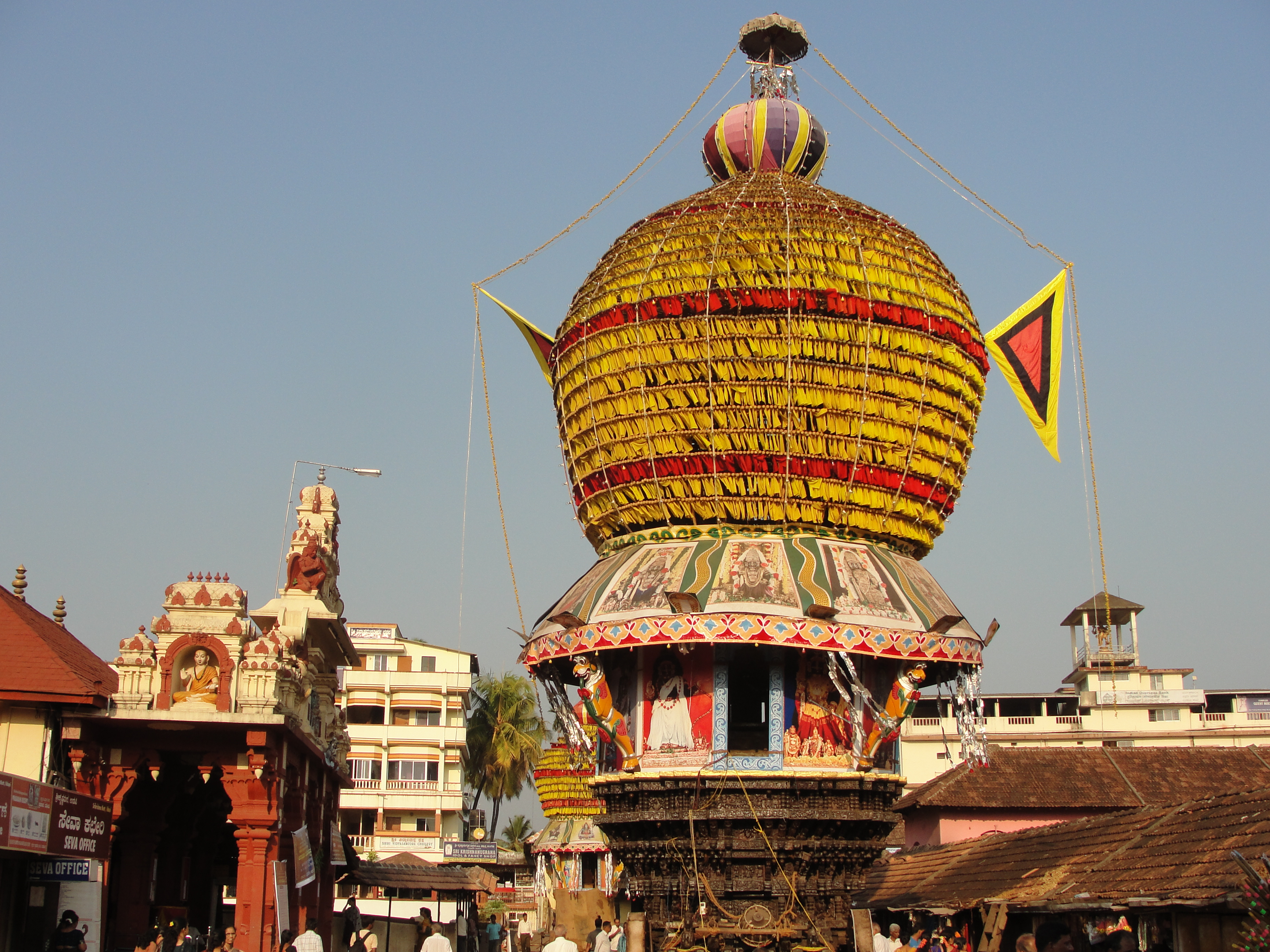
Temple car (decorated), Udupi, Karnataka, India.

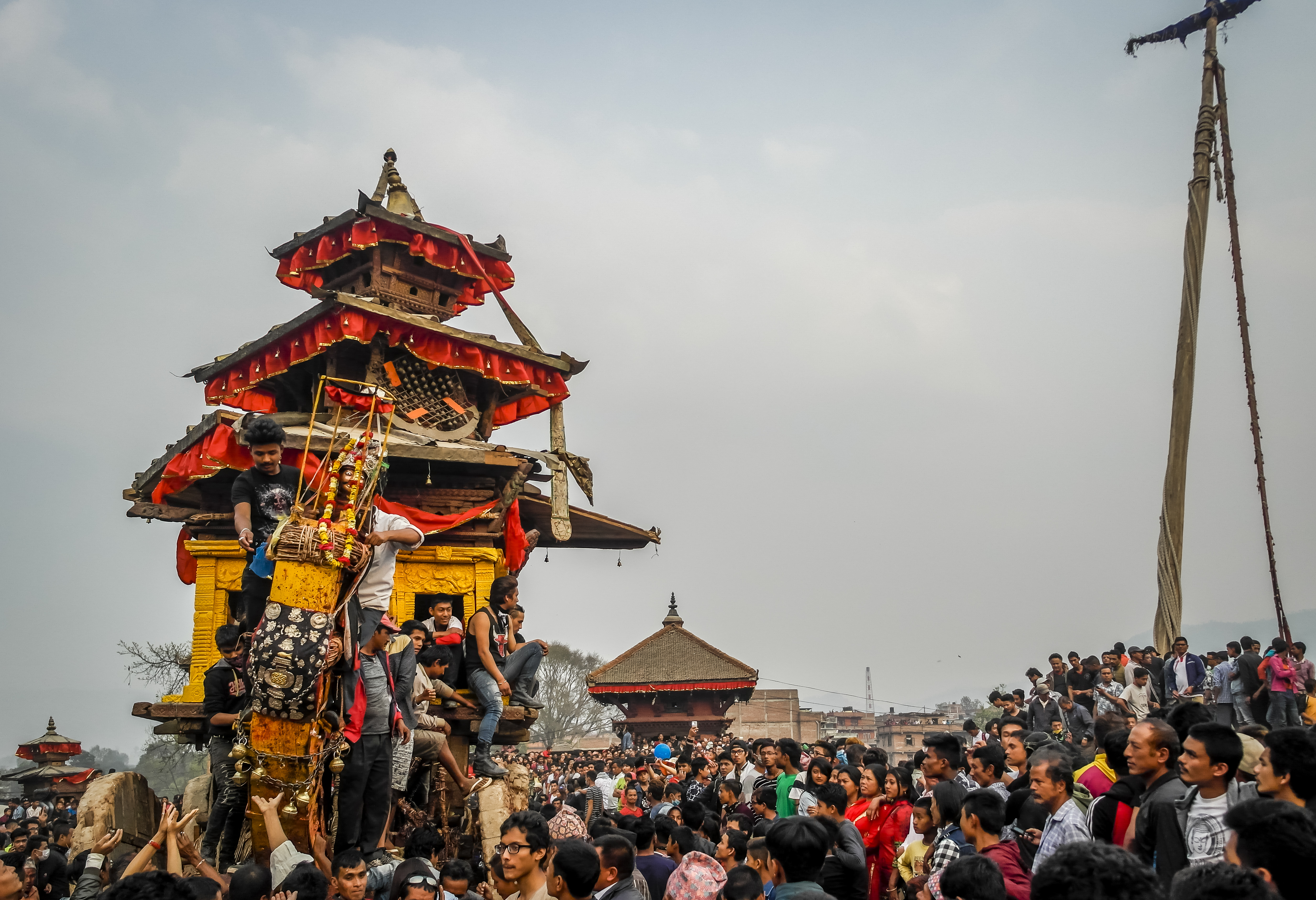
Bisket Jatra Chariot Bhaktapur, Nepal.

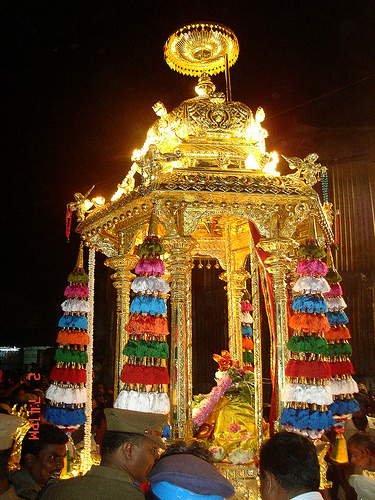
Picture of Tirunelveli Nellaiappar Temple Golden car.

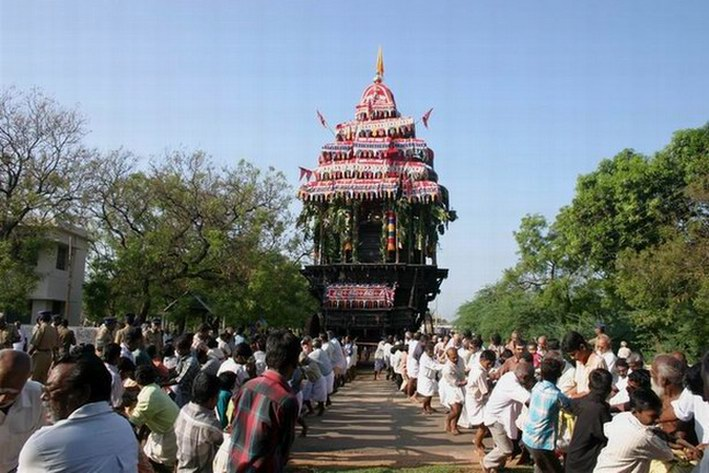
Picture of Alwarkurichi People pulling Sivasailanathaswamy Temple car.

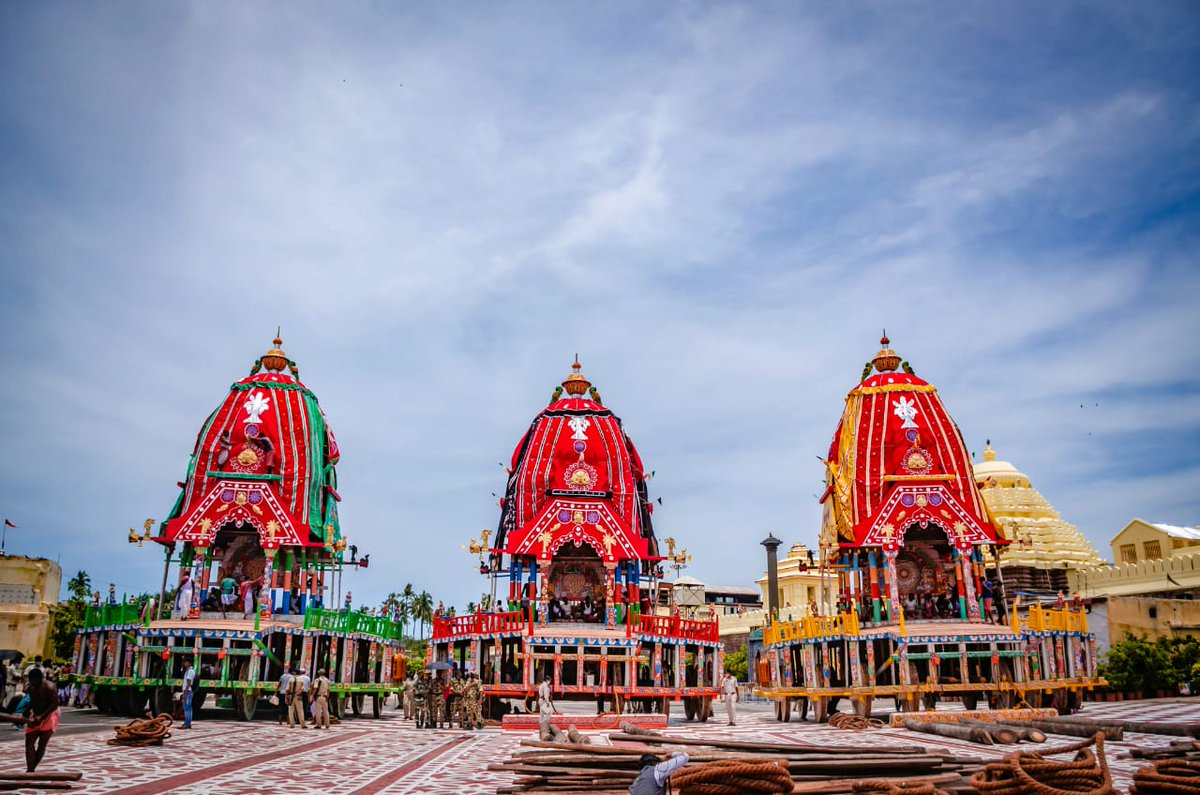
Temple cars in front of Jagananth temple, 2021

== List of places with traditional Temple cars ==
=== India ===
==== Tamil Nadu ====
- Alagar Kovil (Kallazhagar Temple)
- Alwarkurichi, Tenkasi
- Aragalur
- Avinashi (Sri Avanashiappar Temple)
- Bhavani Kooduthoorai, Tamil Nadu (4 chariots)
- Coimbatore (Koniamman Temple)
- Chidambaram (Nataraja Temple)
- Dindigul (Abiramiyamman Kovil)
- Denkanikottai (Betarayaswamy Kovil)
- Erode (Chennimalai, Sivagiri, Sivanmalai, Vijayamangalam)
- Gobichettipalayam (Sri Kondathukalaimman Temple, Sri Balamurugan Temple and others)
- Hosur (Chandra Choodeswarar Temple)
- Kadayanallur
- Kalaiyar Kovil (Swarna Kaleeswarar Temple)
- Kallal Town (Somasundareswarer Kovil)
- Kanchipuram (Varadharaja Perumal Temple, Ekambareswarar Temple and others)
- Karuvalur (Shri Mariamman Kovil)
- Karamadai (Ranganathaswamy temple)
- Kumbakonam (Sri Saarangapani Temple, Adi Kumbeswarar Temple and others)
- Lalgudi (Saptharishishwarar Temple, Lalgudi)
- Madurai (Sri Meenakshi Amman Temple and others)
- Mannargudi (Sri vidhya Rajagopalaswamy temple)
- Minjur (Sri Ekambaranathar temple)
- Mylapore, Chennai (Sri Kapaleeshwarar Temple)
- Nanguneri (Vanamamalai Perumal Temple)
- North Authoor (Sri Somanathar Somasundari Temple)
- Palani (Sri Dhandayudhapani Temple)
- Perur (Sri Patteewarar Temple)
- Pillaiyarpatti (Sri Karpaga Vinayagar Temple)
- Rameswaram (Ramanathaswamy Temple)
- Sakkottai, Karaikudi
- Samayapuram (Maariamman Temple)
- Sankarankovil (Sankara Narayanasamy Temple)
- Srivaikuntam (Srivaikuntanathan Permual Temple) – (Fourth largest temple car in Tamil Nadu)
- Suchindram (Thanumalayan Temple)
- Srivilliputtur (Srivilliputhur Andal Temple) - (Second largest temple car in Tamil Nadu)
- Salem (Elampillai, Aranagalur, Rasipuram)
- Sholinghur (Sri Lakshmi Narasimha Swamy Temple)
- Srimushnam (Bhu Varaha Swamy Temple) - Second largest temple car in Tamilnadu)
- Srirangam (Sri Ranganatha Swamy Temple)
- Tenkasi (Kasi Viswanathar Temple, Tenkasi)
- Tiruchendur (Sri Subramanya Swami temple)
- Tiruchirappalli (Thayumanavar Temple)
- Thanjavur (Brihadeeswara Temple)
- Thirukkadaiyur (Amritaghateswarar-Abirami Temple)
- Thirukkurungudi (Thirukkurungudi Vaishnava Nambi Temple)
- Thirukoshtiyur (Sri Sowmiya Narayana Perumal Temple)
- Thirunageswaram (Oppiliappan Temple)
- Thirunallar (Dharbaranyeswarar Temple)
- Thiruparankundram (Subramaniya Swamy Temple)
- Thirupathiripuliyur (Padaleeswarar temple)
- Thiruthangal (Ninra Narayana Perumal Temple)
- Thiruvanaikaval (Jambukeswarar Temple)
- Thiruvanthipuram, (Devanathaswamy temple)
- Thiruvarur (Thiyagarajar Temple) - (First largest temple car in Asia)
- Tirunelveli (Sri Nellaiappar Temple) – (Third largest temple car in Tamil Nadu)
- Tiruchengode (Sri Arthanareeswarar Temple) - (Fourth largest temple car in Tamil Nadu)
- Tiruvannamalai (Annamalaiyar Temple, 5 Chariots)
- Tirupattur (Aruilmigu Muthukumara Swamy Thirukkovil, God Shiva chariot)
- Thirthahalli
- Tiruvallur (Veeraraghava Swamy Temple)
- Tiruvidaimarudur (Mahalinga Swamy Temple) Chariots
- Triplicane, Chennai (Sri Parthasarathy Temple)
- Thungapuram (Ariyalur-Perambalur)
- Vaitheeswaran Koil (vaidyanatha Swamy Temple)
- Vedaranyam (Vedaranyeswarar Temple)
- Vickramasingapuram (Sivanthiappar Kovil)
- Virudhunagar
- Vasudevanallur (Sri Cinthamani Nathar temple (arthanathiswarar temple)

==== Karnataka ====
- Banavasi
- Bengaluru (Someshwara Temple)
- Bantwal
- Gokarna (Sri Mahabaleshwara Temple)
- Hampi (Immovable stone chariot built by Vijayanagara Kings)
- Karinjeshwara
- Kateel (Shri Durga Parameshwari Temple)
- Kollur, Udupi (Mookambika Temple)
- Mangalore (Shri Venkataraman temple)
- Nanjangud (Srikanteshwara Temple)
- Mulki (Shree Venkataramana Temple)
- Mulki (Shree Kalikamba Temple)
- Mulki (Shri Bappanadu Temple)
- Mysuru (Chamundeshwari Temple)
- Puttur, (Shri Maha Lingeshsara Temple)
- Suratkal
- Udupi
- Idagunji (Mahaganapathi Temple)

==== Odisha ====
- Bhubaneswar
- Puri

==== Kerala ====
- Chettikulangara (Chettikulangara Devi Temple)
- Cherai
- Palakkad, Kerala (Many temples in settlements of Palakkad)

==== Andhra Pradesh ====
- Kadiri (Sri Khadri Lakshmi Narasimha Swami Temple)
- Koduru
- Mangalagiri (Sri Panakaala Lakshmi Narasimha Swami Temple)
- Srikalahasti (Sri Kalahastheeswara Temple)
- Tirumala (Sri Venkateshwara Temple)
- (Sri Bala Tripura sundare sametha sangamesara swami temple sangam jagarala mudi)

==== Others ====
- Manali New Town (Aiyya Temple)
- Yanam
- Mumbai (Lalbaugcha Raja has a Rath yatra like atmosphere for the days of Ganesh chaturthi until Ganesh Visarjan)

=== Malaysia ===
- George Town (Nattukkottai Chettiar Temple)
- Kuala Lumpur (Seri Maha Mariamman Temple Devasthanam),(Batu caves for Thaipusam)
- Teluk Intan (Nagarathaar Sri Thendayuthapani
- Bukit Mertajam penang (Shri Maha Mangalanayagi Amman Devasthanam, Bukit Mertajam)

=== Sri Lanka ===
- Colombo
- Trincomalee (Koneswaram temple)

=== Germany ===
- Hamm, Germany (Sri Kamadchi Ampal Temple)

=== USA ===
- San Francisco Bay Area (Golden Gate Park Rath Yatra)
- New York City (Rath Yatra)

== List of places with golden Temple cars ==
=== Andhra Pradesh ===
- Lord Shiva temple
- Narasimhaswami temple and tirumala Sri vari ratham

=== Karnataka ===
- Gokarna (Shri Mahabaleshwar temple)
- Kateel (Shri Durga Parameshwari temple)
- Kollur (Mookambika Temple)
- Konchady, Mangalore (Mahalasa Narayani Temple)
- Udupi (Sri Krishna matha)

=== Puducherry ===
- Sri Arulmigu Manakula Vinayagar, Pondicherry, Puducherry

=== Tamil Nadu ===
- Arulmigu Maruntheeswar, Thiruvanmiyur, Chennai
- Arulmigu Devi Karumariamman, Thiruverkadu, Chennai
- Arulmigu Vadapalani Andavar, Vadapalani, Chennai
- Arulmigu Kamatchiamman, Mangadu, Chennai
- Arulmigu Kanthaswamy, Parktown, Chennai
- Arulmigu Mundakakanniamman, Mylapore, Chennai
- Arulmigu Kapaleeswarar, Mylapore, Chennai
- Maruthamalai, Coimbatore (Subramanya Swamy Temple)
- Coimbatore (Eachanari Vinayagar Temple)
- Coimbatore (Thandu Mariamman Temple)
- Arulmigu MeenakshiSundareswarar, Madurai
- Arulmigu Solaimalai Murugan, Pazhamudircholai, Alagarkovil Madurai
- Arulmigu Jambukeswarar, Thiruvanaikkaval, Trichy
- Arulmigu Nellaiappar Temple, Tirunelveli
- Arulmigu Ramanathaswamy, Rameswaram
- Arulmigu Subramaniaswamy, Thiruchendur
- Arulmigu Kamatchiamman, Kanchipuram
- Arulmigu Dandayuthapaniswamy, Palani
- Arulmigu Swaminathaswamy, Swamimalai
- Arulmigu Subramanyaswamy, Thiruttani
- Arulmigu Anjaneyaswamy, Namakkal
- Arulmigu Pachaimalai Murugan, Gobichettipalayam
- Arulmigu Pariyur Kondathu Kaliamman, Gobichettipalayam
- Arulmigu Mariamman, Bannari, Erode
- Arulmigu Velayuthaswamy, Thindalmalai, Erode
- Arulmigu Arthanareeswarar, Tiruchengode
- Arulmigu Subramaniyaswamy, Sivanmalai, Tirupur
- Arulmigu Kottaimariamman, Dindigul
- Arulmigu Arunachaleswarar, Thiruvannamalai
- Arulmigu Vaidhyanathaswamy, Vaitheeswaran Kovil
- Arulmigu Mahalinga Swamy Temple, Thiruvidaimarudur (SILVER CHARIOT)
- Arulmigu SankaraNarayanaswamy, Sankarankovil
- Nanguneri (Arulmigu Vanamamalai Perumal)
- Arulmigu Balamurugan, Raththinagiri
- Arulmigu Mariamman, Samayapuram
- Arulmigu Masaniamman, Anamalai
- Arulmigu Mathurakaliyamman, Siruvachur, Perambalur District
- Arulmigu Angalaparameshwari Amman, Melmalayanur, Villupuram District
- Arulmigu Natarajar Temple, Chidambaram, Cuddalore District - the chariot for Pichandavar on the eighth day of 10-day long festival
- Arulmigu Yoga Lakshmi Narasimar temple, Sholinghur, Ranipet district.
- Arulmigu Vijayapuri Amman temple, Vijayamangalam, Erode

== See also ==
- Ratha
- Carroccio
- Carriage
