= Dakshina Mookambika =

Dakshina Mookambika may refer to Saraswati temples in Kerala, India:

- Dakshina Mookambika Temple North Paravur, a temple in the town of North Paravur, Ernakulam district
- Panachikkadu Temple, a temple in the village Panachikkad, Kottayam district
- Sri Dhakshina Mookambika Temple, a temple located at Kulangarakkonam, Machel P.O, Thiruvananthapuram district
