= Oru Odai Nadhiyagirathu =

- DVD cover
- Directed by: C. V. Sridhar
- Written by: C. V. Sridhar
- Produced by: C. V. Sridhar
- Starring: Raghuvaran; Sumalatha; Manochitra; Prathapachandran
- Cinematography: Tiwari
- Edited by: M. Umanath; M. Mani
- Music by: Ilaiyaraaja
- Production company: Chithralaya
- Release date: 2 December 1983
- Running time: 130 minutes
- Country: India
- Language: Tamil

Oru Odai Nadhiyagirathu (transl. A stream becomes a river) is a 1983 Indian Tamil-language film, written, produced and directed by C. V. Sridhar and starring Raghuvaran. The female leads were Sumalatha and Manochitra (daughter of T. S. Balaiah). The film was released on 2 December 1983.

== Plot ==
Raghuvaran visits his friend's place on a tour and one night he happens to see a woman while returning from a party. On that rainy night, he rapes her and leaves. He speaks about this incident to his friend and his friend advises him not to search for that girl, as she would have forgotten it. Haunted by guilty feelings, Raghuvaran searches for her later, but is unable to find her.

Meanwhile, the woman becomes pregnant and, unable to come to terms with this incident, leaves that place with her father. In the new place, she gives birth to a boy, and she tries to search for Raghuvaran, even though she never recalls his face from that dreaded rainy night.

Later, Raghuvaran marries Manochitra as everyone forces him, even though he is still fond of Sumalatha, the woman he raped. Whether Sumalatha finds Raghuvaran and what happens to Manochitra, or whether Raghuvaran identifies his son forms the climax.

== Cast ==
- Raghuvaran
- Sumalatha as Divya
- Manochithra as Vasanthi
- Prathapachandran
- Kathadi Ramamurthy
- M. R. Krishnamurthy
- Typist Gopu
- Anuradha

== Soundtrack ==
The soundtrack was composed by Ilaiyaraaja. The song "Thendral Ennai Muththam Ittadhu" is set in Malayamarutam raga, "Kanavu Ondru" is in Revati, and "Thalaiyai Kuniyum" is in Reetigowla.

Track	Singers	Lyrics
"En Thegam Amudham"	S. Janaki	Vairamuthu
"Thalaiyai Kuniyum Thaamaraiye"	S. P. Balasubrahmanyam, S. Rajeswari	Vairamuthu
"Thendral Ennai Muththam"	Krishnachandran, B. S. Sasirekha	Vairamuthu
"Kanavu Ondru"	S. Janaki	Vairamuthu
"Raaththiri Pozhuthu"	P. Jayachandran, S. P. Sailaja	Gangai Amaran

== Critical reception ==
Jayamanmadhan of Kalki said the actors underacted, praised the film's opening scenes but criticised the abundance of songs and inclusion of item number. Balumani of Anna praised the acting, music, cinematography and also praised Sridhar's talent for opening scenes, sharp dialogues.

== Bibliography ==
- Sundararaman (2007) [2005]. Raga Chintamani: A Guide to Carnatic Ragas Through Tamil Film Music (2nd ed.). Pichhamal Chintamani. OCLC 295034757.
