= Dakshina Mookambika Temple, North Paravur =

Hindu temple in Kerala, India

Dakshina Mookambika Temple North Paravur
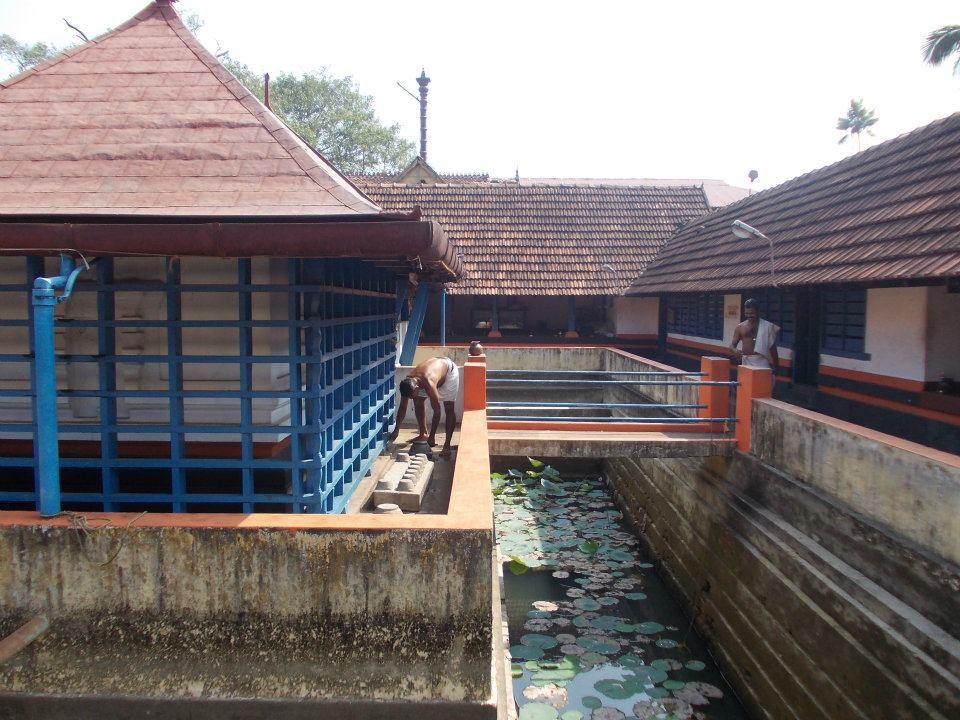
- Lotus pool inside the temple

- Dakshina Mookambika Temple, North Paravur, Ernakulam, Kerala

Religion
- Affiliation: Hinduism
- Deity: Mookambika

Location
- Location: North Paravur, Ernakulam, Kerala, India
- Interactive map of Dakshina Mookambika Temple North Paravur
- Coordinates: 10.146703°N 76.232116°E

Architecture
- Type: Architecture of Kerala

Specifications
- Temple: One
- Elevation: 25.82 m (85 ft)

Website
- www.dakshinamookambika.org

The Dakshina Mookambika Temple is a famous Mookambika temple in the town of North Paravur in the Ernakulam district of Kerala. The presiding deity in this temple is Mookambika and sub-deities include Ganapathy, Kartikeya, Mahavishnu, Yakshi, Hanuman and Veerabhadran. A shrine devoted to Yakshi is at the southwest corner. The sanctum sanctorum is in the midst of a lotus pool.

According to legends, Thampuran (ruler) of Paravur was a great devotee of Goddess Mookambika. He used to visit the Kollur temple in Mangalore every year to pay homage to the goddess. When he became old, his health worsened and he could no longer undertake the long journey to Kollur. The goddess appeared to the sad devotee in a dream and ordered him to build her idol near his palace so that he can have daily darshan of her. Thampuran followed her instructions, built a temple at Paravur and installed the Goddess.

== Festivals ==
The famous Navaratri festival is celebrated here with great fervor. Thousands of people participate in the Navaratri music festival. On Durgashtami, books are arranged before the image of Goddess Saraswathy and on Vijayadashami morning, Ezhuthinirithu or Vidyāraṃbhaṃ ceremony takes place at a special mandapam which goes from 4 am to 11 am. Thousands of little children are initiated into the world of letters by making them write the word harisree on rice, their tongues or sand with a golden ring.

Apart from the Navratri festival, the "ten-day annual festival" is celebrated in the month of Makaram (January–February). The music festival and Vidyāraṃbhaṃ ceremony are the main features of this festival.

== See also ==
- Temples of Kerala
