= Maranakatte =

Village near Kundapra, India

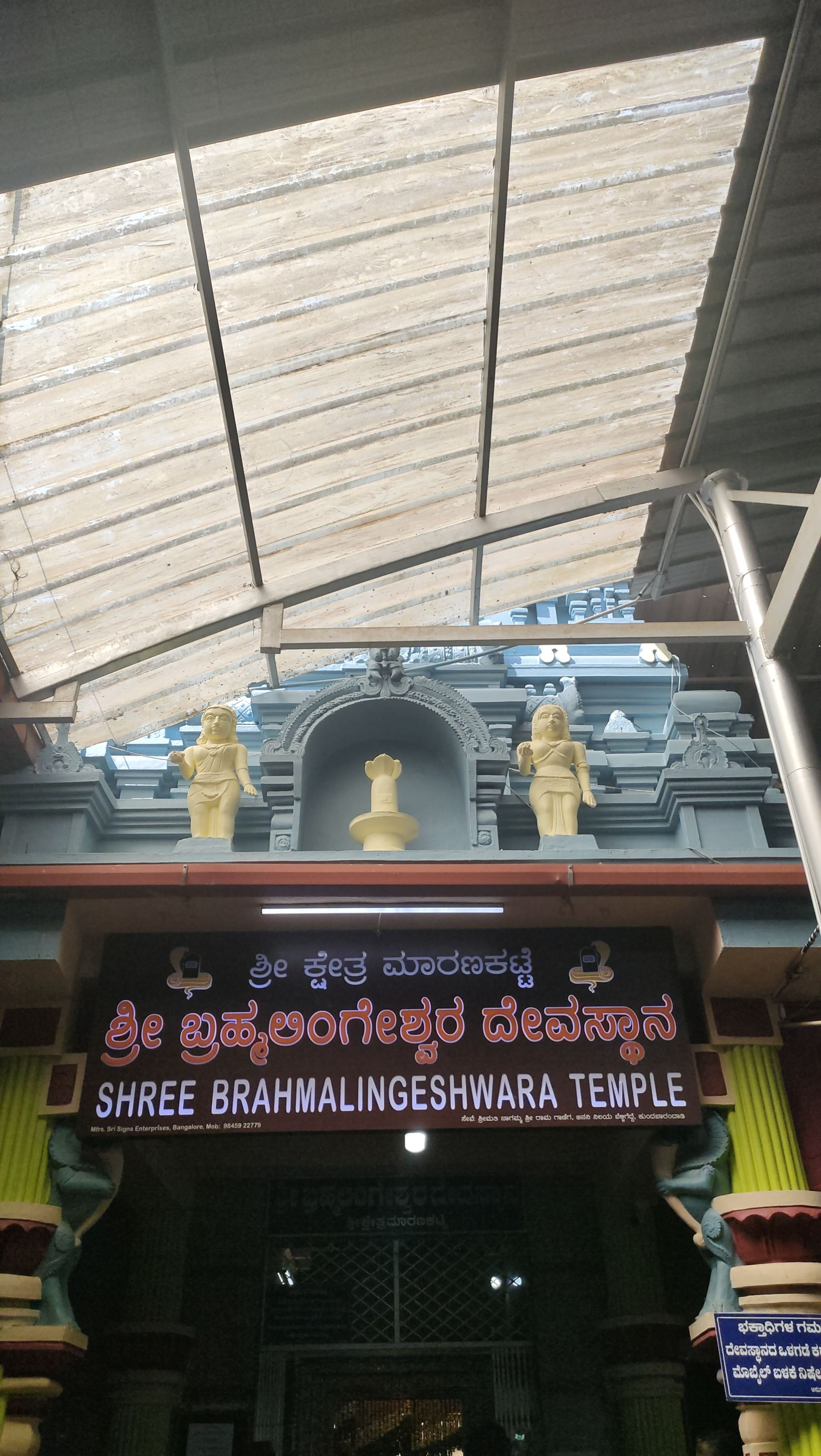
Shri Brahmalingeshwara temple

Maranakatte is located at a distance of 21 km from Kundapura on the way to Kollur and the village is also called Kanchinakodlu. There is a Brahmalingeshwara Temple which is located on the banks of river Brahmakunda in the northside which then takes a steep turn towards east which increases the beauty of the spot.

== Mythology ==
Kamhasura, an asura, performed Bhairavi Yaga and pleased the divine mother and took a boon that he shouldn't be killed by any male being or entity. The asura having received the boon started wreaking havoc in the three worlds, disturbing peace and good people. The Trimurtis and all the devas prayed to the divine mother to save them from his misdeeds. The goddess sends a messenger to warn him to mend his ways but he does not relent due to his arrogance. To further gain powers, he performs severe penance to please Lord Shiva or Shankara, he suddenly loses his power of speech i.e. he becomes 'mooka' or dumb. In the battlefield he sees the divine mother and at once realizes his follies and misdeeds, but he is unable to beg forgiveness due to his state of being dumb. Jaganmata realizes this and grants him the power of speech; Mookasura (Kamhasura) repents and begs for moksha and asks of his name to stay forever. The divine mother agrees and says after slaying him, she shall be called Mookambika after him.

According to Skanda Purana, Goddess Mookambika performed a Marana Homa here after killing Mookasura. After slaying the demon, the divine mother granted divinity to the demon's soul and blessed him to be known as Brahmalingeshwara. The Temple faces east side & the sanctorum faces the north. By the sides of the Sanctorum, the main lord Brahmalingeshwara there is Malayali Yakshi & vata Yakshi & also two Dwarapalakas. To the right of the Sanctorum there is a katte (colloquial Kannada) in which Sri Chakra yantra is established by Adi Shankara. Beside the "Brahmalingeshwara Gudi" there is a 'Daivadha mane' of Hashaiguli (who came from Kashi or Varanasi), Haiguli, Chikku and other parivara daivas.

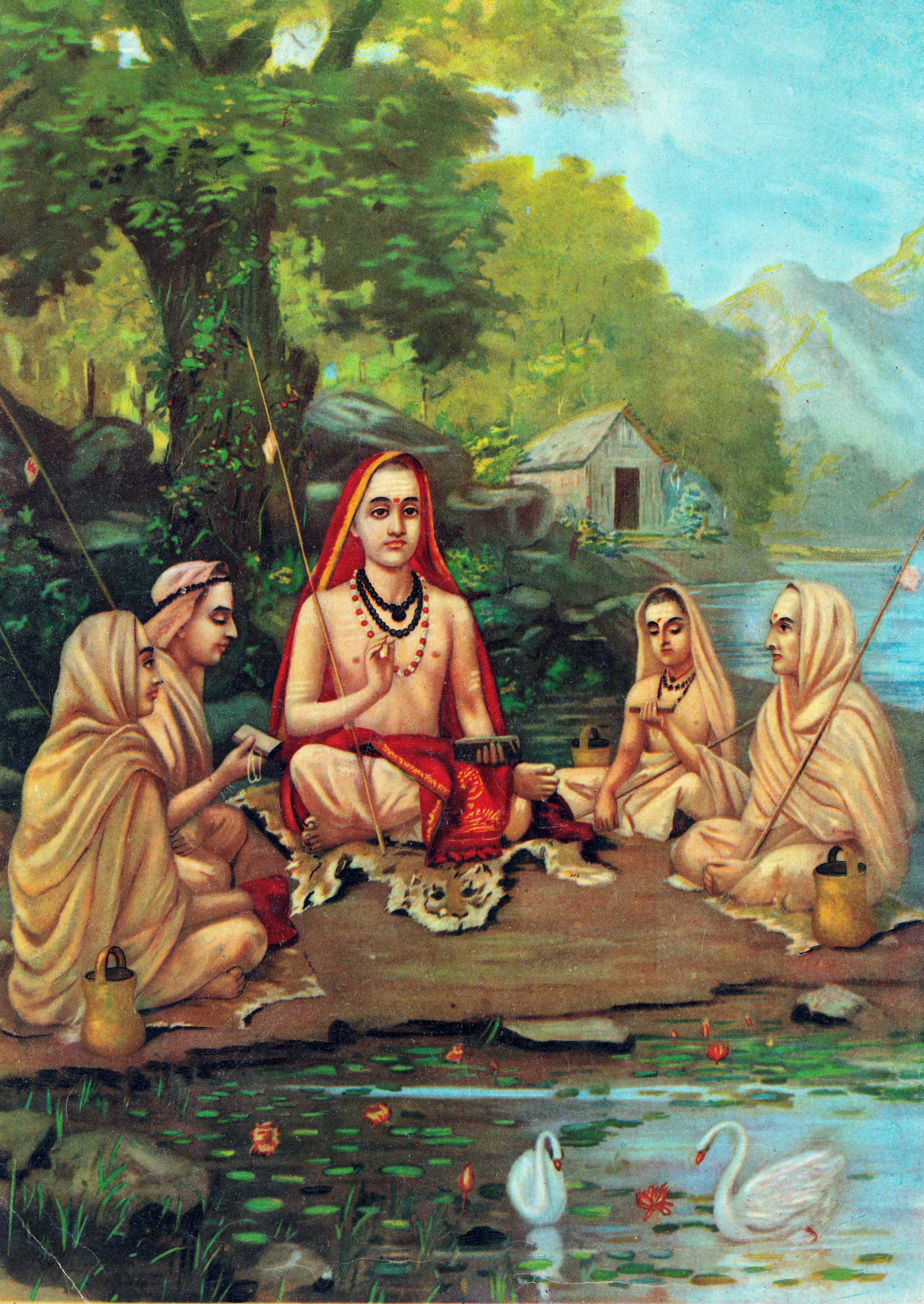
Adi Shankara with disciples, by Raja Ravivarma,1904

There is a mother-son relationship between Goddess Mookambika and Shri Brahmalingeshwara.

The temple organises an annual "Fair" which the locals rejoice and remember it by the famous phrase "Maranakatte Habba" on the day of Makara Sankranthi.

== Influenced by Adi Shankara ==
The temple is also influenced by sage Adi Shankaracharya, who established the Sri Chakra at this temple. Therefore, it is called Adi Shankara sthapana.

== Fair ( Maranakatte Habba) ==
On Makara Sankranthi, like many other temples in Dakshina Kannada, a temple fair is arranged here which attracts a multitude of people from all over the Udupi district and neighbouring districts. The specialty of the place is settling of disputes & promises uttered in the name of God (vaakya teermana) which have a deep influence in the mind of the devotees. People who are possessed by spirits can get cured of the possession by the grace of the lord. People especially troubled by Brahmarakshasa (spirit of a deceased Brahmana who has done misdeeds in life) can get definitive solutions to this kind of problem.

== See also ==
- Kollur
- Udupi
- Anegudde
- Kundapura
- Saligrama
- Maravanthe
