= Kollur Mookambika Temple =

Hindu temple in Karnataka, India

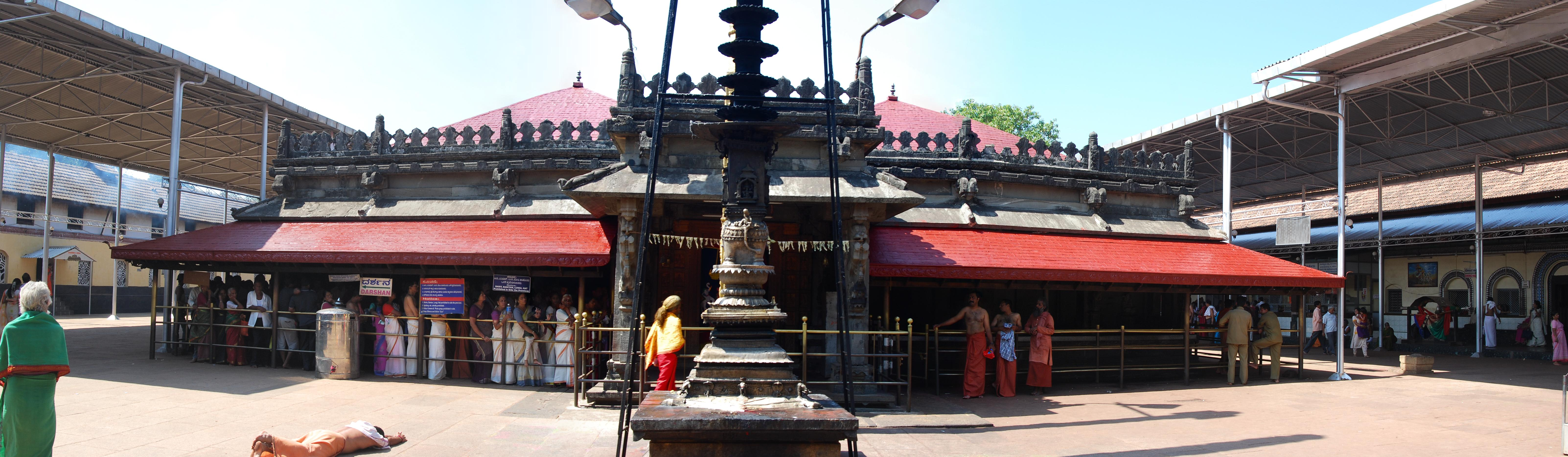
- Inside view of the Kollur Mookambika temple

- Location in Karnataka

Religion
- Affiliation: Hinduism
- District: Udupi
- Deity: Mookambika
- Festivals: Rathotsava, Navaratri, Vijaya Dashami

Location
- Location: Byndoor
- State: Karnataka
- Country: India
- Coordinates: 13.8638°N 74.8145°E

Architecture
- Type: A mix of different styles, such as Dravidian, Vijayanagara, and Hoysala
- Creator: King Halugallu Veera Sangayya
- Completed: ~800 CE

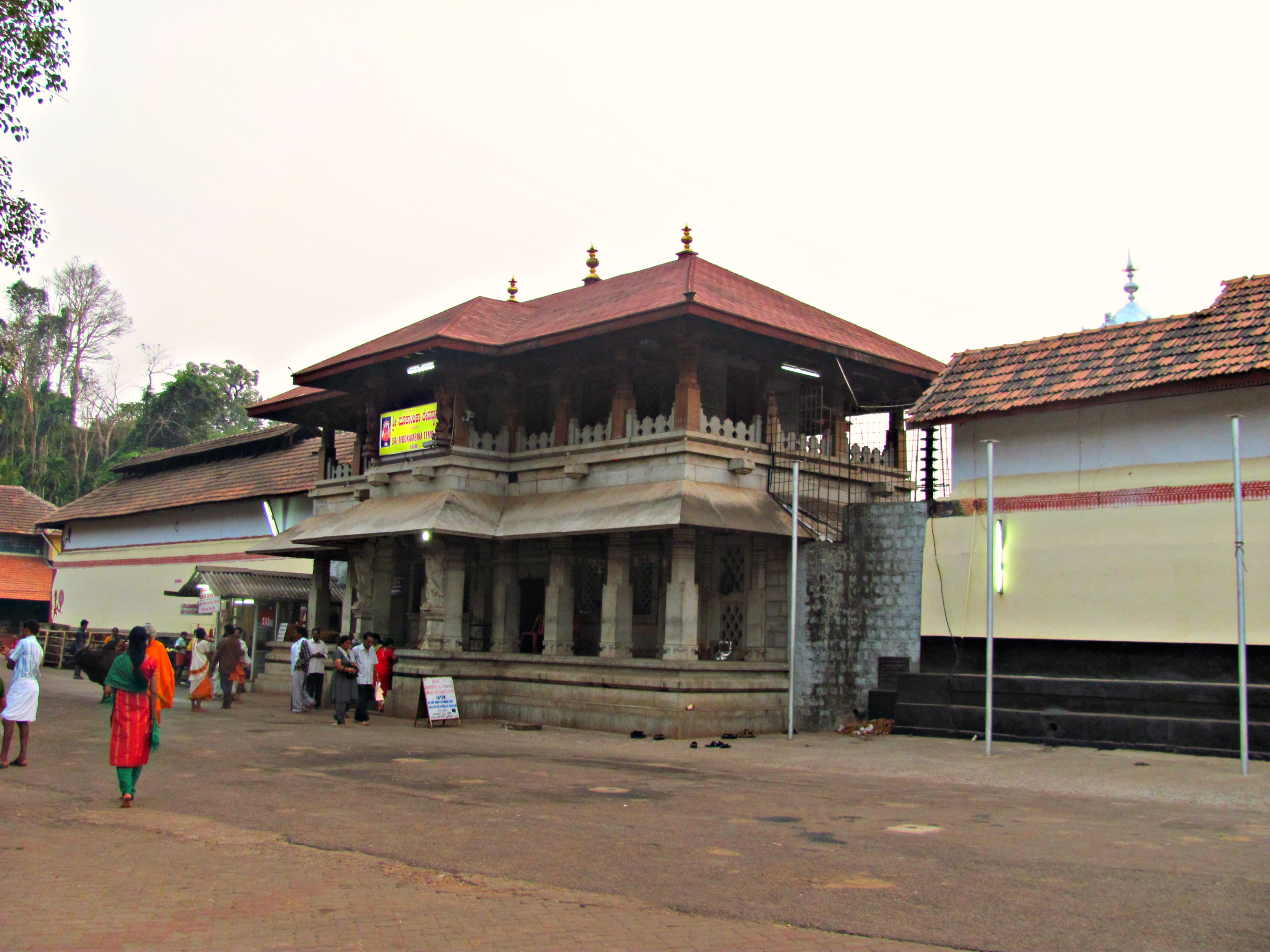
The entrance

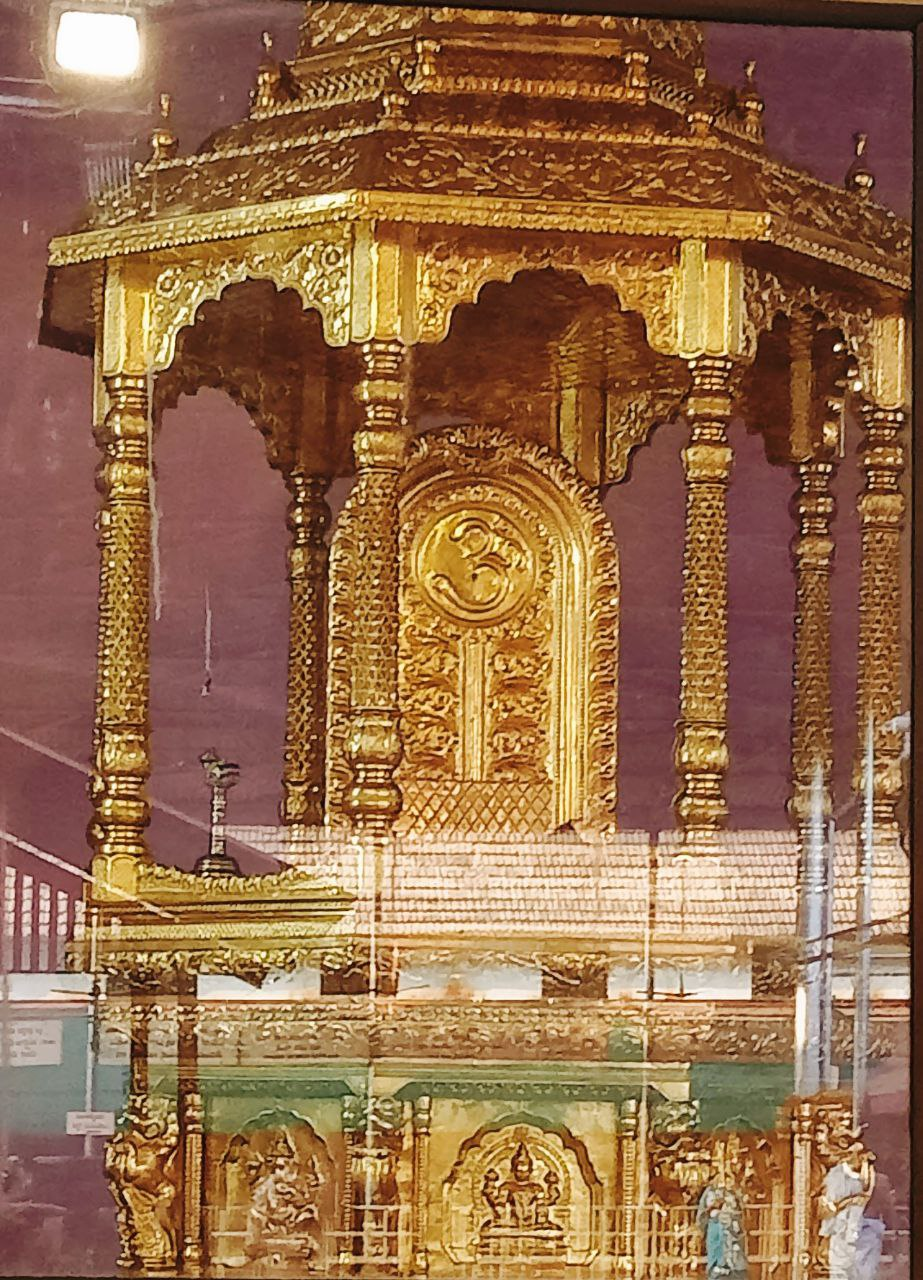
The Golden Chariot of Sree Mookambika Devi

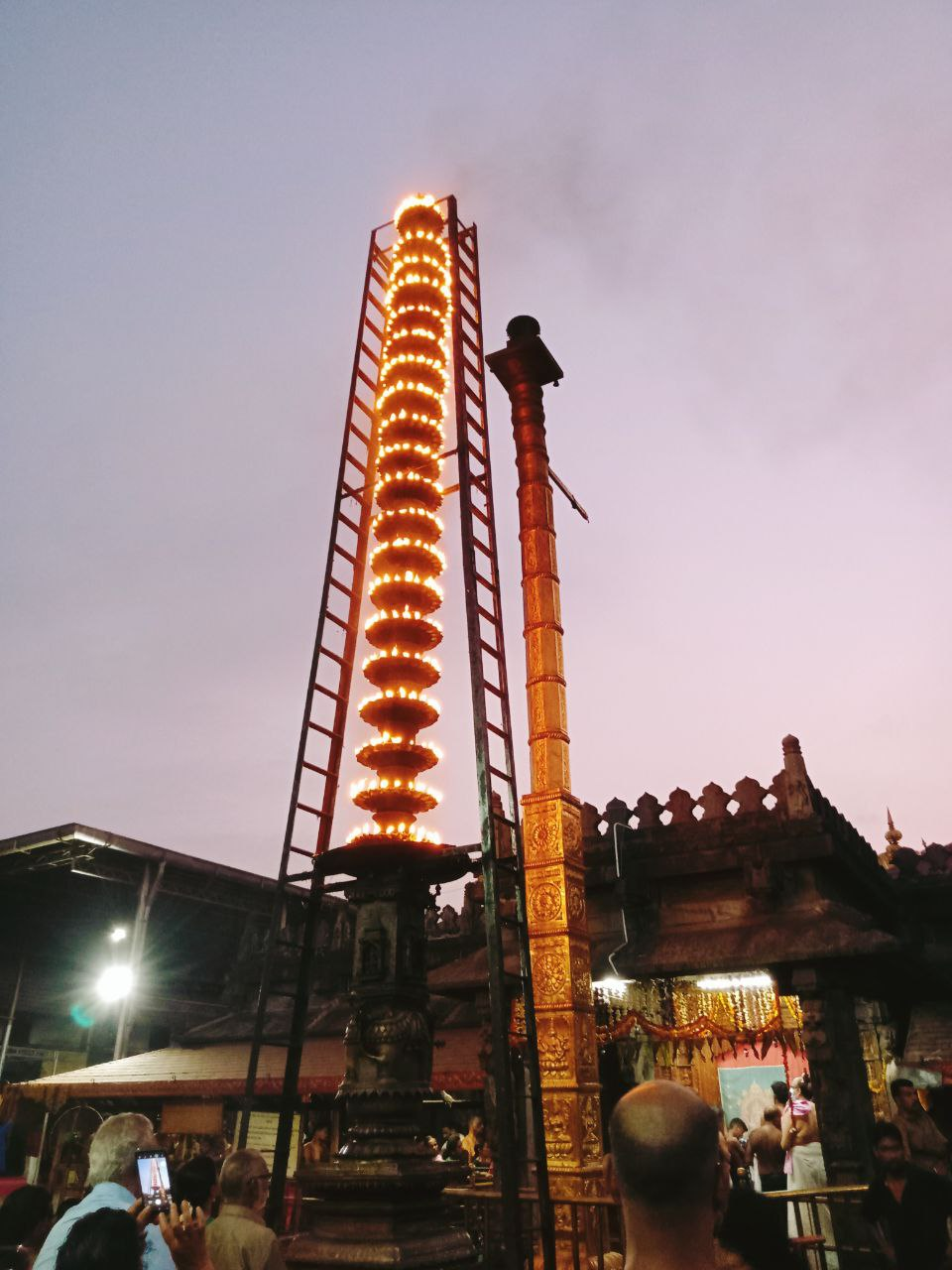
Lamp and the Kodimaram (Dvajastambha)

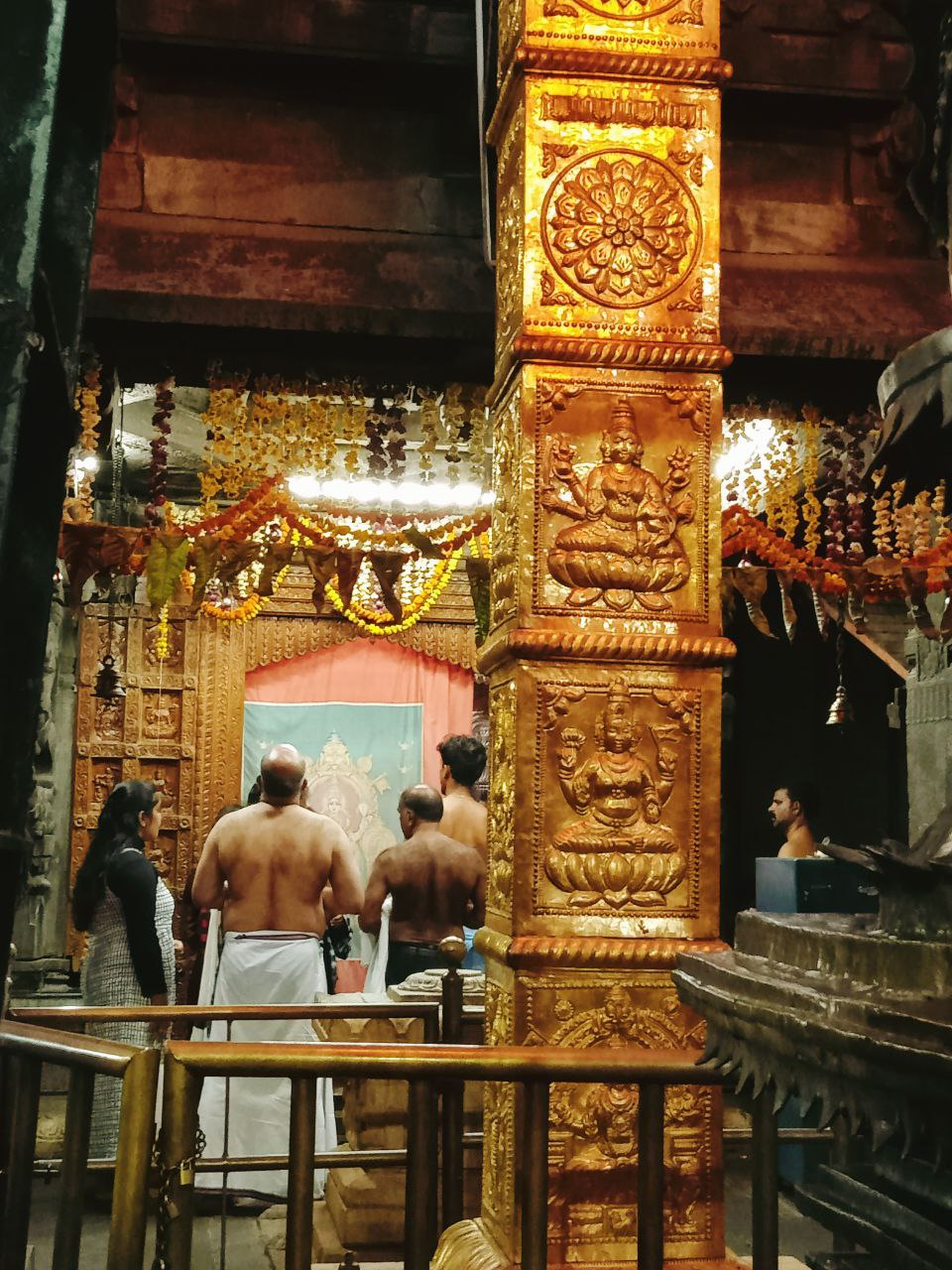
view of the entrance

Kollur Mookambika Temple is located at Kollur in Byndoor Taluk of Udupi District in the region of Tulunadu ,state of Karnataka, near Kundapur India. It is a Hindu temple dedicated to the mother goddess Mookambika.

Mookambika is the union of Adi Parashakti and Parabramha as the Linga has integrated on its left side "Maha Kali, Maha Lakshmi and Maha Saraswathi". The temple is very special because it is part of the 108 Durgalayas and 108 Shivalayas. It is situated in the foothills of Kodachadri hills, on the southern bank of Souparnika River. Being situated in the land between Gokarna and Kanyakumari, believed to be created by sage Parashurama.

== Idols, Sub- Shrines and Festivals ==
The main deity of the temple is a swayambhu (self-born) linga with a golden line cutting it into half, in which the left half represents the goddess triad - the Tridevis, and the right half represents their consorts - the male triad - the Trimurtis.

A four-handed panchaloha idol of the goddess Mookambika is also installed. Mookambika is seen seated in the Padmasana position with four arms, with two arms holding a Shankha (conch) and Chakra (divine discus). The other two arms hold the Abhaya mudra and the Abheestha mudra (Varada mudra).

There are sub-shrines for Ganapathi, Shiva, Vishnu, Hanuman, Subrahmanya, Virabhadra and Snake gods (Naga Devathas) in the temple.

Rathotsava (Chariot festival) in the month of Phalguna and Navaratri in the month of Ashwin are the main festivals in this temple. Goddess Mookambika is said to be the name given to Goddess Tridevi after she killed the demon Mookasura (also known as Kaumasura).

Though the temple is located in Karnataka, most number of devotees coming here are from the neighbouring state of Kerala. It is also one among the most popular shrines visited by Malayalis (People of Kerala) irrespective of religion and caste.

== Mythology ==
The present deity in form of a devi was established by Adi Shankara. The linga is worshipped as Moola Devi and the representation of devi as a four armed goddess was installed by Adi Shankara. Once, Sage Kola Maharishi was performing Tapas here when he was persistently troubled by a demon. This Demon had also been praying to Lord Shiva to get powers that would make him invincible and let him do whatever he wanted. Knowing the evil mind of this demon, Shakthi made him Mooka (Dumb). So, when Lord Shiva appeared before him, he was unable to ask for any boon. Enraged by this, the Demon began to harass Kola Maharishi, who was also praying to the Lord. Kola Maharishi appealed to the Divine Mother for help. So, Devi Shakthi came down and vanquished the Demon, Mookasura.

Henceforth, in this region, she came to be known as Mookambika. Lord Shiva also appeared before the sage. Maharishi Kola asked that the Lord with His Consort should remain here forever. To grant his wish, a Jyotirlinga appeared, with a Swarnarekha (golden line) in the middle. Thus, one half of this Linga stands for the conscious principle as embodied by Shiva, Vishnu and Brahma, while the other stood for the Creative Principle in the form of Parvati, Lakshmi and Saraswathi.

Goddess Uma appeared here with Lord Shankara and slayed Mukasura. The Goddess Mookambika is in the form of Jyotir-Linga incorporating both Shiva and Shakthi. Thus the temple forms a part in both 108 Shivalayas and 108 Durgalayas of ancient Kerala'.

=== Relationship with Brahmalingeshwara ===
According to Skanda Purana, Goddess Mookambika performed a Marana Homa here after killing Mookasura. After slaying the demon, the divine mother granted divinity to the demon's soul and blessed him to be known as Brahmalingeshwara, to which his temple is located in Maranakatte, 20 kms away from the Goddess. In Maranakatte, the main lord is Shri Brahmalingeshwara, besides him there is Malayali Yakshi & vata Yakshi & also two Dwarapalakas. To the right of the Sanctorum there is a katte (colloquial Kannada) in which Sri Chakra yantra is established by Adi Shankara. Beside the "Brahmalingeshwara Gudi" there is a 'Daivadha mane' of Hashaiguli (who came from Kashi or Varanasi), Haiguli, Chikku and other parivara daivas.

== See also ==
- Mookambika Wildlife Sanctuary
- Marikamba Temple, Sirsi
- Chamundeshwari Temple, Mysore
- Annapurneshwari Temple, Cherukunnu
- Yellamma Temple, Saundatti
- Maranakatte
