= Mookambika =

Hindu goddess

- Goddess of Knowledge; Mother Goddess
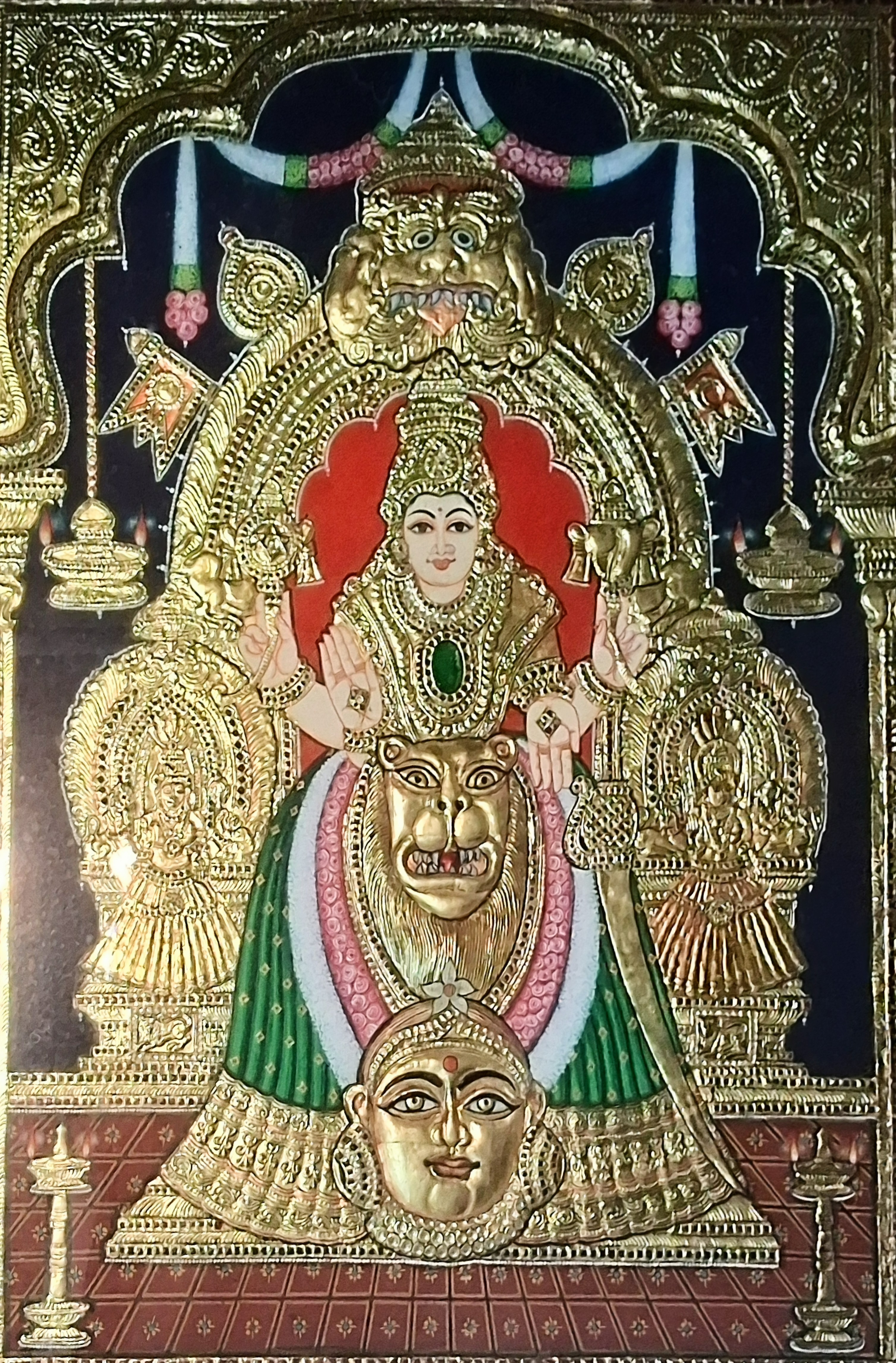
- Painting of Mookambika at Kollur
- Affiliation: Saraswati; Lakshmi; Parvati; Mahadevi
- Abode: Kollur
- Weapon: Chakram
- Symbol: Shankha
- Day: Friday
- Mount: Asiatic lion
- Gender: Female
- Temple: Kollur Mookambika Temple
- Festivals: Navaratri; Temple car festival

Mookambika (Sanskrit: मूकाम्बिका, Tamil: மூகாம்பிகை, Kannada: ಮೂಕಾಂಬಿಕೆ,Tulu ಅಪ್ಪೆ ಮೂಕಂಬಿಕೆ, Telugu మూకాంబికా,Malayalam: മൂകാംബിക ) is a Hindu goddess, an aspect of Adi Parashakti, the supreme goddess of Hinduism. She is regarded to be the form of Shakti, the divine feminine energy, that represents creativity and ingenuity. She is widely worshipped in the states of Karnataka, Kerala and Tamil Nadu. Her most important abode is the Mookambika Temple located in Kollur village in Udupi district of Kundapura, Karnataka.

== Legend ==
Once, an asura named Kaumasura attempted to appease the deity Shiva through penance to become invincible. He had previously received a boon to be killed by only a woman, but because of the death of Mahishasura, Kaumasura was alarmed. In order to prevent this, the goddess Saraswati thwarted his speech at the request of the devas, causing him to be incapable of requesting a boon from Shiva. This made Kaumasura (now named Mookasura, mooka meaning dumb) livid with rage. He defeated Indra took over his kingdom, and subjected the three worlds to chaos. In order to restore the cosmic balance, the Trimurti (Brahma, Vishnu, and Shiva) called on their wives, the Tridevi (Saraswati, Lakshmi, and Parvati) to create a form to defeat the asura. Their combined energies culminated into a goddess, who rode on a lion and slew Mookasura, acquiring the name, Mookambika.

== Veneration ==
According to popular tradition, during the period Mookambika had slain Kamasura, a sage from Kollur performed penance to both the Trimurti and Tridevi and requested for a murti (idol) of all these deities to be established on the spot that he performed the penance. They granted this wish, and became a linga with a golden line, a rekha, splitting in the middle, so that one side represented the Trimurti and the other, the Tridevi. Over time, Adi Shankara is regarded to have found a vigraham, or an idol, which replicated Mookambika, and established it behind the linga, to form the sanctum sanctorum of the Mookambika temple, in Kollur, Karnataka. The goddess is venerated as Saraswati in the morning, Lakshmi at noon, and Parvati during the evening.

Another popular legend associated with Mookambika and Adi Shankara states that Adi Shankara wanted to build a temple for the goddess Saraswati in Kerala and thus performed penance to please the deity. Saraswati agreed to Adi Shankara's request, provided he led her to Kerala without looking back at her. He agreed to this condition but soon realized that the Goddess's anklets no longer jingled and so, curiosity overtook him, and he looked behind. Because he broke her condition, Saraswati stayed at the spot (Kollur) where he had turned. But because Adi Shankara had performed austerities for her, the goddess agreed that she would be part of the Chottanikkara Temple in Kerala as well as in the Mookambika temple. Thus, the doors of the Chottanikkara Temple are opened right after those of the Mookambika Temple. The main mantra used to venerate Mookambika devi mantra is the Mahalakshmi Astakam Stotram written by Indra.

== See also ==
- Kamala
- Ishvari
- Jaganmata
