= S. Rajeswari =

Indian Carnatic musician

- Born: Subramanian Rajeswari; 1946 (age 78–79); Pollachi, Tamil Nadu, India
- Occupation(s): Carnatic musician, music teacher
- Known for: Vocal accompaniment for Bharatanatyam, Carnatic music
- Awards: Sangeet Natak Akademi Award (2010); Kalaimamani (2020); M.S. Subbulakshmi Award (2020); Sahana Fine Arts Award

S. Rajeswari (born 1946) is an Indian Carnatic musician and music teacher from Tamil Nadu, known for her contributions to Carnatic music and vocal accompaniment for Bharatanatyam performances, particularly with dancer Kumari Kamala.

== Early life and education ==
Rajeswari was born in 1946 in Pollachi, Tamil Nadu. She trained in Carnatic music under musicians such as Tanjai Balasubramaniam, Ramnad Krishnan, and T. Muktha.

== Career ==
Rajeswari has specialized in vocal accompaniment for Bharatanatyam, notably collaborating with dancer Kumari Kamala for several decades. She has also performed as a Carnatic music vocalist and taught music, contributing to the preservation of traditional styles. Her work integrates Carnatic music with dance, focusing on rhythmic and melodic support for choreography.

== Awards and recognition ==
- In 2010, Rajeswari received the Sangeet Natak Akademi Award for her contributions to vocal accompaniment for Bharatanatyam.
- In 2020, she was awarded the Kalaimamani by the Government of Tamil Nadu for her contributions to music.
- In 2020, she received the M.S. Subbulakshmi Award for her contributions to Carnatic music and dance accompaniment.
- She was honored by Sahana Fine Arts, Chennai, for her musical contributions.
