= Tridevi =

Trinity of chief goddesses in Hinduism

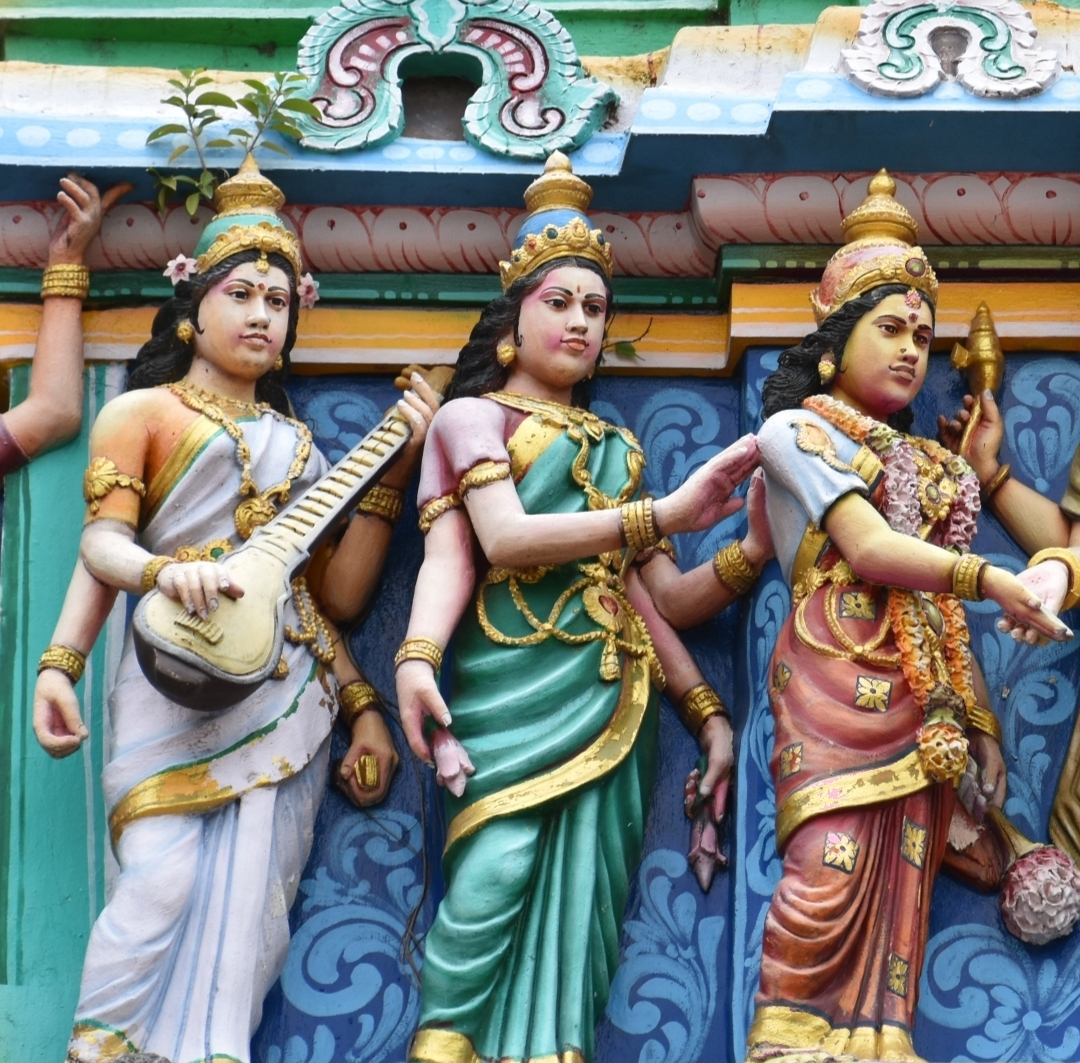
Sarasvati (left), Lakshmi (middle) and Parvati (right)

The Tridevi (Note: Sanskrit: त्रिदेवी, lit. 'three goddesses', IAST: Tridevī) form a trinity of supreme divinity in Hinduism, combining a triad of eminent goddesses either as a feminine version of the Trimurti, or as consorts of a masculine Trimurti, depending on the denomination. This triad is typically personified by the Hindu goddesses Saraswati, Lakshmi, and Parvati. In Shaktism, these triune goddesses are the manifestations of Mula-Prakriti or Mahadevi.

In the traditional androcentric (masculine-centered) denominations of Hinduism, the feminine Tridevi goddesses are relegated as consorts and auxiliary deities to the masculine Trimurti gods. In Shaktism, the feminine Tridevi goddesses are given the eminent roles of creator (Mahasaraswati), preserver (Mahalakshmi), and destroyer (Mahakali), with the masculine Trimurti gods being relegated as the auxiliary deities as agents of the feminine Tridevi.

== Consorts of the Trimurti ==
Saraswati is the goddess of learning, arts, and music, as well as the consort of Brahma, the creator.

Lakshmi is the goddess of fortune, wealth, fertility, auspiciousness, light, and material and spiritual fulfillment, as well as the consort of Vishnu, the maintainer or preserver. However, Lakshmi does not signify mere material wealth, but also abstract prosperity, such as glory, magnificence, joy, exaltation, and greatness, and spiritual fulfillment, which translates to moksha.

Parvati is the goddess of power, war, beauty, and love. She is the consort of Shiva, the destroyer of evil, or transformer.

== Feminine Trimurti ==
Mahasarasvati represents the guna of sattva (quality of knowledge/purity) of Mahadevi in the Devi Mahatmya.

Mahalakshmi represents the guna of rajas (dynamic energy) of Mahadevi. According to the Devi Bhagavata Purana, she emerged from the left side of Mahadevi. She subsequently divided herself into Lakshmi and Radha—among various other forms—to become consorts of Vishnu's avatars. In some sectarian accounts, Mahalakshmi is portrayed as having courted kings, which may have led to the development of her aspects of the fickle Rajya Lakshmi and the virtuous Vishnupriya Lakshmi.

Mahakali represents the guna of tamas (quality of darkness) of Mahadevi. She is stated to be a powerful cosmic aspect (vyaṣṭi) of Devi, and personifies the concepts of transformation and time.

=== Outside India ===
Via Buddhism and syncretism with Japanese Shinto deities, the Tridevi entered Japanese mythology as the goddesses Benzaitennyo 弁財天女 (Sarasvati), Kisshoutennyo 吉祥天女 (Laxmi), and Daikokutennyo 大黒天女 (Mahakali or Parvati).

== See also ==
- Adi Shakti
- Ammavaru
- Buddhist Tenbu (天部) deities
- Devi
- Durga
- Harishankari
- Kali
- Lakshmi
- Mookambika
- Parvati
- Radha
- Saraswati
- Sita
- Trimurti
- Trinity
- Triple deities
- Vaishno Devi
