= Kollur, Udupi district =

Kollur
- village
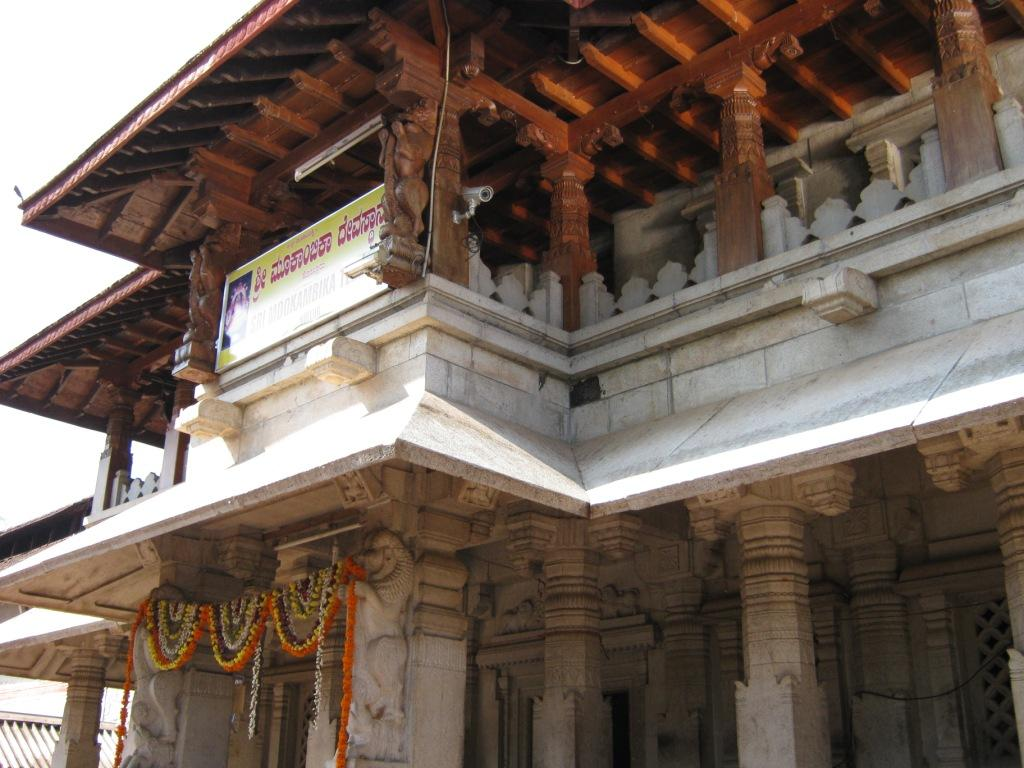
- Interactive map of Kollur
- Coordinates: 13°51′50″N 74°48′50″E
- Country: India
- State: Karnataka
- District: Udupi
- Taluk: Byndoor

Government
  - Body: Gram panchayat

Population (2001)
  - Total: 5,496

Languages
  - Official: Kannada
- Time zone: UTC+5:30 (IST)
- Postal code: 576220
- ISO 3166 code: IN-KA
- Vehicle registration: KA
- Website: udupi.nic.in

Kollur (Kannada: [kolːuːru]) is a Temple town and well developed village in Byndoor taluk of Udupi District in the southern Indian state of Karnataka.

As of the 2001 India census Kolluru had a population of 3863 with 1900 males and 1962 females.

Mookambika Road Byndoor railway station (Station code: BYNR) is a railway station in Byndoor,Udupi district ,Karnataka state, India under the jurisdiction of the Konkan Railway Corporation Limited.The station primarily serves pilgrims visiting the famous Kollur Mookambika Temple and is the nearest railway station to reach the temple. It falls under the Karwar region of the Konkan Railway.

== See also ==
- Byndoor
- Kundapura
- Udupi
- Districts of Karnataka
- Kollur
