= Koonthalur =

Village

Coordinates: 10°55′46″N 79°31′12″E

Koonthalur is a small riverside village situated 20 km from Kumbakonam on the way to Karaikal in the route of Koothanur Saraswathi Temple. Koonthalur keeps traditional, natural originality by the way of Green Coconut Trees and Paddy forms.

Koonthalur is famous for Koonthalur Murugan Temple believed by Hindu Lord Murugan devotees is the place to cure from Saturn Transition troubles.

Koonthalur Murugan Temple 1600 years old ancient temple which is built by the ancient rulers of pallavas and chola kings.

Temple Lord Siva worshipped by thirugnanasambandar and appar. Saint roma rishi worshipped the lord siva and attain holy blessings by lord siva.

In Thirupugazh saint Arunagiri Nathar wrote a song and worshipped Temple Lord Murugan.
