= Ottakoothar =

12th century Tamil poet

Kavichakravarthi Ottakoothar
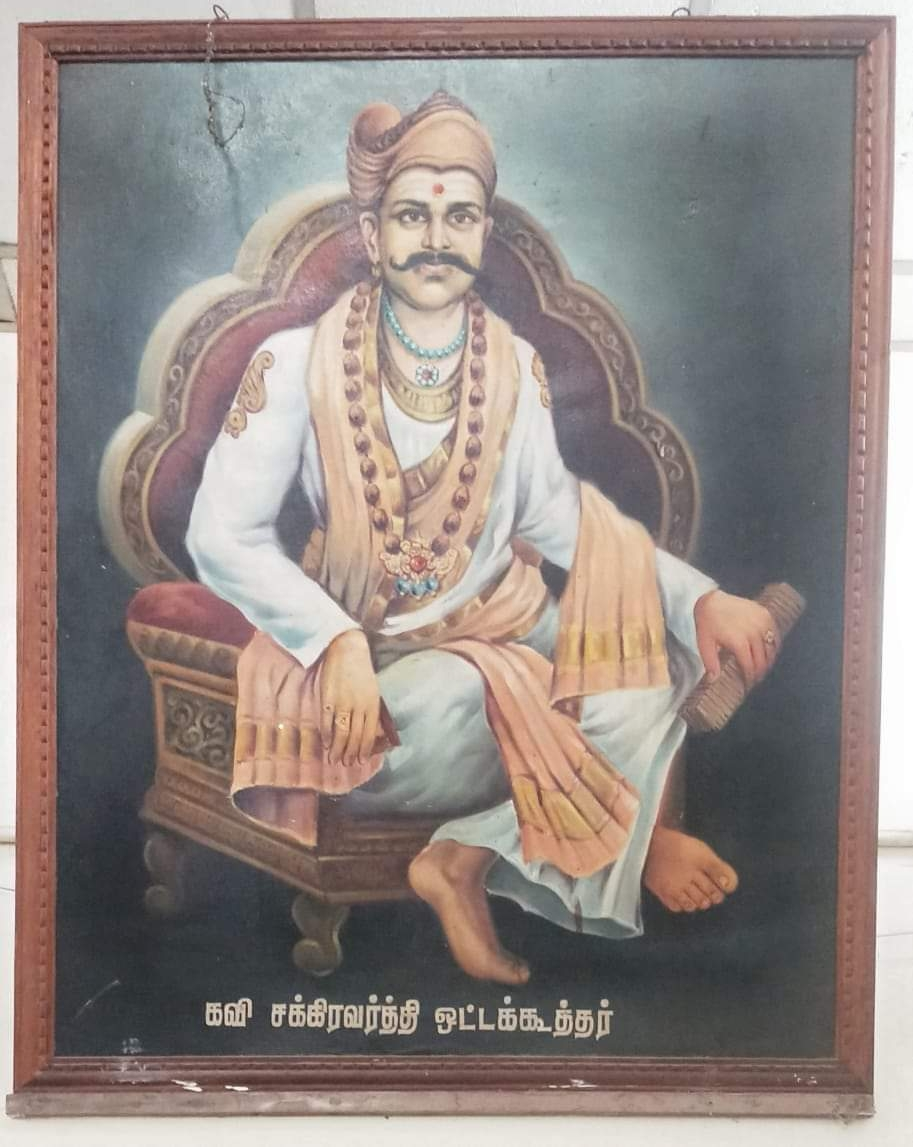
- A portrait of Ottakoothar in the wall of Tiruchengode Sengunthar Nattanmaikarar sabai
- Born: Ponnambala koothar, Koothan; Thiruverumbur, Tiruchirapalli
- Occupations: Court poet, Minister
- Relatives: Sengunthar
- Writing career
- Language: Tamil
- Period: 12th century CE
- Notable works: Vikrama Cholan Ula; Kulottunga Cholan Ula; Rajarajan Cholan Ula; Uttara Kaandam of Raamaayanam; Kulothunga Cholan pillai tamil; Takka-yaaka-parani; Eeti-elupattu

Ottakoothar (c. 12th century CE) was a Tamil court poet and minister to three Later Chola kings, namely Vikrama Chola, Kulotunga II and Rajaraja II. He wrote poems in praise of these three kings.

The poet's memorial is believed to be still in a place known as Darasuram in Kumbakonam, just opposite the famous Airavatesvara Temple. According to legend, the goddess Saraswati blessed him in Koothanur, then he became a famous poet.

== Family ==
According to a legend, there was once a Chola king called Muchukundan who had his capital at Karur. He is said to have won the favor of God Murugan after deep penances and the latter is said to have bestowed upon him his personal bodyguards to aid him in his wars. Muchukundan Chola then married Chitravalli, daughter of the warrior chief and Murugan's bodyguard called Virabahu and spawned a new line. The poet Ottakoothar is presented as the scion of the family of this Sengunthar chief in his work Eeti-elupattu. It is worth mentioning that this Muchukunda Chola figures in the ancestry of Rajendra I as detailed in his Tiruvalangadu copper plates.

== Literary works ==
Ottakoothar (Tamil: ஒட்டக்கூத்தர்) is renowned for his Ula poems on the three successive kings, Vikrama Chola, Kulothunga II and Rajaraja II. The Ula poems are generally written in honor of the king and describe the triumphant procession of the king amidst the people and his subjects. He also authored a work dealing with the Kulottunga II's childhood called Kulottunga Cholan Pillai Tamil. Ottakoothar wrote Uttara Kandam, the seventh (last chapter) kandam of the Tamil epic Ramayanam. Ottakoothar's works can be found at the open access Tamil literature repository Project Madurai.

During this period when he was very popular, the Sengunthar community, the one to which he belonged, asked him to compose a work in their honor. He initially refused but then later agreed provided they brought him 1008 heads of their first-born sons. Accordingly, 1008 members of the community sacrificed their lives so that he could write about their history. The poet then wrote Eeti-elupattu, a poem consisting of seventy verses in honor of the spear and extolled the glorious past of the Sengunthar chiefs and soldiers. He later wrote another poem called Elupp-elupattu in order to bring back the 1008 dead members to life. When he sang it the heads are said to have miraculously attached to their bodies and the dead became alive once again. The poet Koothar thus came to be known as Otta Koothar for he attached the heads to the bodies and revived them.

== Popular culture ==
In the 1957 Tamil film Ambikapathy, the character of Ottakoothar was portrayed and was performed by M. N. Nambiar. The character was also played by Rajesh in Mahasakthi Mariamman, a 1986 Tamil film.

== See also ==
- Koothanur Maha Saraswathi Temple
