= Koothanur Maha Saraswathi Temple =

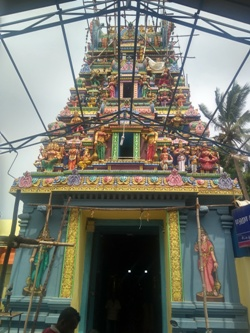
- The entrance of the temple

- Location within Tamil Nadu

Religion
- Affiliation: Hinduism
- District: Tiruvarur
- Deity: Mahasaraswati

Location
- Location: Koothanur, Tiruvarur district
- State: Tamil Nadu
- Country: India
- Coordinates: 10.933186°N 79.645662°E

Architecture
- Type: Dravidian architecture

Koothanur Maha Saraswathi Temple is a Hindu temple located in the town of Koothanur in the Tiruvarur district of Tamil Nadu, India. It is dedicated to Saraswathi, the Hindu goddess of learning.

== Significance ==
Temples dedicated to Saraswati are very rare in India. The temple is Tamil Nadu's only Hindu temple with Saraswathi as main deity. Praises of the temple were sung by Tamil poets Ottakoothar and Kambar. Vijayadasami is the most popular festival celebrated in the temple.
