= Koothanur =

Town in Tamil Nadu, India

Koothanur is a town situated in the Tiruvarur district of Tamil Nadu, India (10.9315° N, 79.6474° E). The town is located at a distance of 25 kilometres from Tiruvarur. A temple for Saraswati, the Hindu goddess of learning is situated in this place. Koothanur is the only temple in Tamil Nadu for the goddess Saraswati. Saraswati is considered as the goddess of knowledge so people believe that if they worship this deity they will become good in knowledge.

== History of Koothanur ==
Koothanur is the birthplace of the Tamil poet Ottakoothar. Legend has it that the Chola emperor Rajaraja Chola II named this village in honour of Ottakoothar, hence the name Koothanur. Koothanur has become an important tourist spot since.Vijayadasami festival is celebrated in Koothanur which is one of the most important festivals in this temple.

== See also ==
- Koothanur Maha Saraswathi Temple
