= Saraswati =

Principal Hindu goddess; goddess of knowledge, music, and speech

- Mother Goddess; Goddess of knowledge, education, learning, speech, arts, music, poetry, sciences, purification, language and culture Personification of the Saraswati River
- Member of Tridevi and Pancha Prakriti
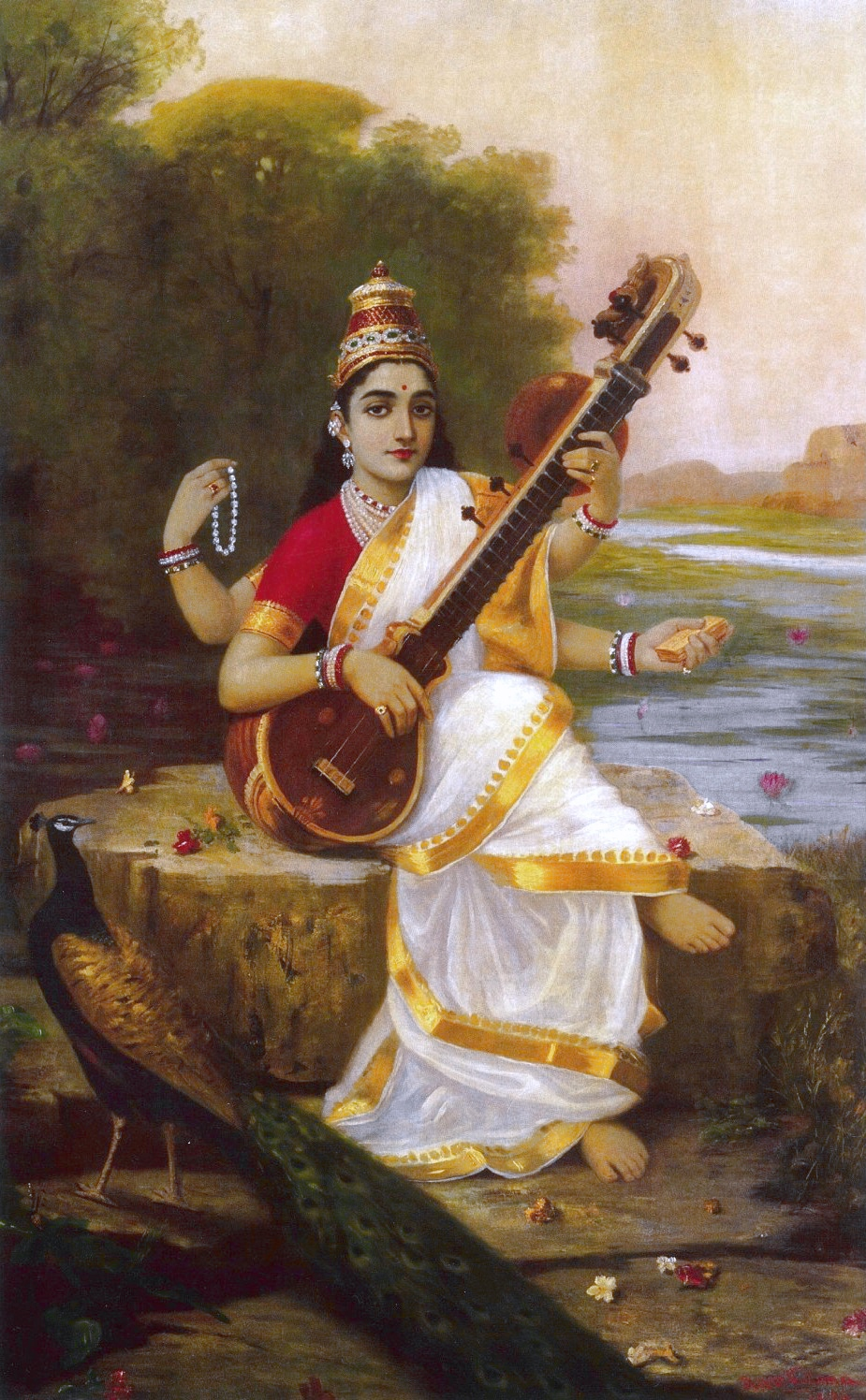
- Painting of Sarasvati by Raja Ravi Varma
- Other names: Bharati; Brahmani; Savitri; Sharada; Trayi; Vagdevi; Vani; Vidya; Kalaivani
- Sanskrit transliteration: Sarasvatī
- Devanagari: सरस्वती
- Affiliation: Devi; Tridevi; Shakti; Mahadevi; Vach; Gayatri
- Abode: Satyaloka; Manidvipa
- Mantra: om̐ aim mahāsarasvatyaya namaḥ; Sarasvatī Vandanā (Note: The hymn comprises the following four verses: yā kundendutuṣārahāradhavalā yā śubhravastrāvṛtā yā vīṇāvaradaṇḍamaṇḍitakarā yā śvetapadmāsanā yā brahmācyuta śaṃkaraprabhṛtibhirdevaiḥ sadā pūjitā sā māṃ pātu sarasvati bhagavatī niḥśeṣajāḍyāpahā)
- Symbols: Veena; books; rosary; white lotus
- Day: Friday
- Colour: White; yellow
- Mount: Hamsa (white goose or swan); peacock
- Festivals: Vasant Panchami; Sarasvati Puja; Navaratri (7th, 8th & 9th days); Ayudha Puja
- Consort: Brahma

Equivalents
- Persian: Anahita

Saraswati (Sanskrit: सरस्वती, IAST: Sarasvatī), also spelled as Sarasvati, is one of the principal goddesses in Hinduism, revered as the goddess of knowledge, education, learning, speech, arts, poetry, music, creativity, sciences, purification, language and culture. Together with the goddesses Lakshmi and Parvati, she forms the trinity of chief goddesses, known as the Tridevi. Saraswati is a pan-Indian deity, venerated not only in Hinduism but also in Jainism and Buddhism.

She is one of the prominent goddesses in the Vedic tradition who retains her significance in later Hinduism. In the Vedas, her characteristics and attributes are closely connected with the Saraswati River, making her one of the earliest examples of a river goddess in Indian tradition. As a deity associated with a river, Saraswati is revered for her dual abilities to purify and to nurture fertility. In later Vedic literature, particularly the Brahmanas, Saraswati is increasingly identified with the Vedic goddess of speech, Vac, and eventually, the two merge into the singular goddess known in later tradition. Over time, her connection to the river diminishes, while her association with speech, poetry, music, and culture becomes more prominent. In classical and medieval Hinduism, Saraswati is primarily recognized as the goddess of learning, arts and poetic inspiration, and as the inventor of the Sanskrit language. She is linked to the creator god Brahma, either as his creation or consort. In the latter role, she represents his creative power (Shakti), giving reality a unique and distinctly human quality. She becomes linked with the dimension of reality characterized by clarity and intellectual order. Within the goddess-oriented Shaktism tradition, Saraswati is a key figure and venerated as the creative aspect of the Supreme Goddess. She is also significant in certain Vaishnava traditions, where she serves as one of Vishnu's consorts and assists him in his divine functions. Despite her associations with these male deities, Saraswati also stands apart as an independent goddess in the pantheon, widely worshipped as a celibate goddess, without a consort.

She is portrayed as a serene woman with a radiant white complexion, dressed in white attire, representing the quality of sattva (goodness). She has four arms, each holding a symbolic object: a book, a rosary, a water pot, and a musical instrument known as the veena. Beside her is her mount, either a hamsa (white goose or swan) or a peacock. Hindu temples dedicated to Saraswati can be found worldwide, with one of the earliest known shrines being Sharada Peeth (6th–12th centuries CE) in Kashmir. Saraswati continues to be widely worshipped across India, particularly on her designated festival day, Vasant Panchami (the fifth day of spring, and also known as Saraswati Puja and Saraswati Jayanti in many regions of India), when students honor her as the patron goddess of knowledge and education. Traditionally, the day is marked by helping young children learn how to write the letters of the alphabet.

In Buddhism, she is venerated in many forms, including the East Asian Benzaiten (辯才天, "Eloquence Talent Deity"). In Jainism, Saraswati is revered as the deity responsible for the dissemination of the Tirthankaras' teachings and sermons.

== Etymology ==
Saraswati is a Sanskrit fusion word of saras (सरस्) meaning "pooling water", but also sometimes translated as "speech"; and vati (वती), meaning "she who possesses". Originally associated with the river or rivers known as Saraswati, this combination, therefore, means "she who has ponds, lakes, and pooling water" or occasionally "she who possesses speech". It is also a Sanskrit composite word of sarasu-ati (सरसु+अति) which means "one with plenty of water".

The word Saraswati appears both as a reference to a river and as a significant deity in the Rigveda. In initial passages, the word refers to the Saraswati River and is mentioned as one among several northwestern Indian rivers such as the Drishadvati. Saraswati, then, connotes a river deity. In Book 2, the Rigveda describes Saraswati as the best of mothers, of rivers, of goddesses.

Her importance grows in the later Vedas composed after the Rigveda as well as in the later Brahmana texts, and the word evolves in its meaning from "waters that purify", to "that which purifies", to "vach (speech) that purifies", to "knowledge that purifies", and ultimately into a spiritual concept of a goddess that embodies knowledge, arts, music, melody, muse, language, rhetoric, eloquence, creative work and anything whose flow purifies the essence and self of a person.

=== Names and epithets ===
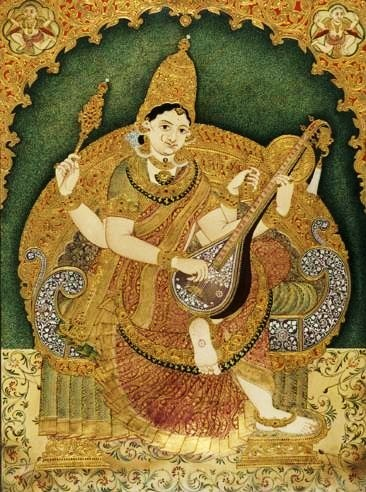
19th Century Mysore Painting of Saraswati.

Saraswati (Sanskrit: Sarasvatī) is known by many names. Some examples of synonyms for Saraswati include Sharada (bestower of essence or knowledge), Brahmani (power of Brahma), Brahmi (goddess of sciences), Bharadi (goddess of history), Vani and Vachi (both referring to the flow of music/song, melodious speech, eloquent speaking respectively), Varnesvari (goddess of letters), Kavijihvagravasini (one who dwells on the tongue of poets).

Other names include: Ambika, Bharati, Chandrika, Devi, Gomati, Hamsasana, Saudamini, Shvetambara, Subhadra, Vaishnavi, Vasudha, Vidya, Vidyarupa, and Vindhyavasini.

In the Tiruvalluva Maalai, a collection of fifty-five Tamil verses praising the Kural literature and its author Valluvar, she is referred to as Nāmagal and is believed to have composed the second verse.

Outside Nepal and India, she is known in Burmese as Thurathadi (သူရဿတီ, pronounced [θùja̰ðədì] or [θùɹa̰ðədì]) or Tipitaka Medaw (တိပိဋကမယ်တော်, pronounced [tḭpḭtəka̰ mɛ̀dɔ̀]), in Chinese as Biàncáitiān (辯才天), in Japanese as Benzaiten (弁才天/弁財天) and in Thai as Suratsawadi (สุรัสวดี) or Saratsawadi (สรัสวดี).

== Historical development and textual attestations ==
In Hinduism, Saraswati has retained her significance as an important goddess, from the Vedic age up to the present day. She is praised in the Vedas as a water goddess of purification, while in the Dharmashastras, Saraswati is invoked to remind the reader to meditate on virtue, and on the meaning (artha) of one's actions (karma).

=== Vedic texts ===
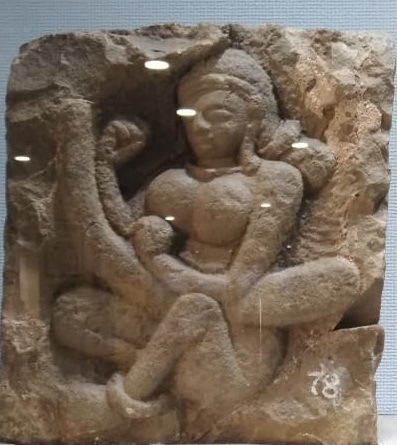
Saraswati, 3rd century CE with veena, Manasa-Mandsaur area.

The earliest references to Saraswati occur in the Vedic Samhitas, the most ancient source of the Vedic religion. In the Rigveda (c. 1500 – 1000 BCE), Saraswati is primarily a deified river embodying abundance, power and fertility. She is invoked in numerous verses, with Hymn 6.61 dedicated entirely to her, while Hymns 7.95–96 are shared with her male counterpart, Sarasvant. According to scholar Catherine Ludwik, Sarasvant is a relatively obscure male river deity who corresponds to Saraswati and is also associated with the waters. The later Vedic literature frequently presents Saraswati and Sarasvant as a divine pair. In the Rigveda, Saraswati is also closely associated with the Waters (Apas) and the storm deities known as the Maruts. Together with Ila and Bharati, she forms a triad of sacrificial goddesses invoked in Vedic rituals. Although originally celebrated as a mighty river, scholars note the foundations of her later development as a goddess of speech, wisdom, and inspiration can already be seen in the Rigveda through her association with inspired thought (dhi), which is linked to Vedic sacrifice performed along the banks of the sacred Saraswati River.

Saraswati is described as a loud and powerful flood who roars like a bull and cannot be controlled. She was associated with the Milky Way, indicating that she was seen as descending from heaven to earth.

The goddess is mentioned in many Rigvedic hymns, and has three hymns dedicated to her (6:61 exclusively, and 7:95–96 which she shares with her male counterpart, Sarasvant). In Rigveda 2.41.16 she is called: "Best of mothers, the best of rivers, best of goddesses".

As part of the Apas (water deities), Saraswati is associated with wealth, abundance, health, purity and healing. In Book 10 (10.17) of the Rigveda, Saraswati is celebrated as a deity of healing and purifying water. In the Atharva Veda, her role as a healer and giver of life is also emphasized. In various sources, including the Yajur Veda, she is described as having healed Indra after he drank too much Soma.

Saraswati also governs dhī (Rigveda 1:3:12c.). Dhī is the inspired thought (especially that of the rishis), it is intuition or intelligence – especially that associated with poetry and religion. Saraswati is seen as a deity that can grant dhī (Rigveda 6:49:7c.) if prayed to. Since speech requires inspired thought, she is also inextricably linked with speech and with the goddess of speech, Vāc, as well as with cows and motherhood. Vedic seers compare her to a cow and a mother, and saw themselves as children sucking the milk of dhī from her. In Book 10 of the Rigveda, she is declared to be the "possessor of knowledge". In later sources, like the Yajur Veda, Saraswati is directly identified with Vāc, becoming a deity called Saraswatī-Vāc.

In the Brahmanas, Saraswati-Vac's role expands, becoming clearly identified with knowledge (which is what is communicated through speech) and as such, she is "the mother of the Vedas" as well as the Vedas themselves. The Shatapatha Brahmana states that "as all waters meet in the ocean...so all sciences (vidya) unite (ekayanam) in Vāc" (14:5:4:11). The Shatapatha Brahmana also presents Vāc as a secondary creator deity, having been the first deity created by the creator god Prajapati. She is the very instrument by which he created the world, flowing forth from him "like a continuous stream of water" according to the scripture. This is the basis for the Puranic stories about the relationship between Brahma (identified with Prajapati) and Saraswati (identified with Vāc).

In other Rigvedic passages, Saraswati is praised as a mighty and unconquerable protector deity. She is offered praises and compared to a sheltering tree in Rigveda 7.95.5, while in 6:49:7 cd she is said to provide "protection which is difficult to assail." In some passages she even takes a fiercesome appearance and is called a "slayer of strangers" who is called on to "guard her devotees against slander". Her association with the combative storm gods called Maruts is related to her fierce fighting aspect and they are said to be her companions (at Rigveda 7:96:2c.).

Like Indra, Saraswati is also called a slayer of Vritra, the snake like demon of drought who blocks rivers and as such is associated with destruction of enemies and removal of obstacles. The Yajur Veda sees her as being both the mother of Indra (having granted him rebirth through healing) and also as his consort.

In Book 2 of Taittiriya Brahmana, Saraswati is called "the mother of eloquent speech and melodious music".

=== Mahabharata ===
Saraswati in the Mahabharata, one of the two great epics of Hindu literature composed between 400 BCE and 400 CE, undergoes a transformation, marking her evolution from a river to a fully developed goddess of speech and knowledge.

==== As a River ====
As a river, Saraswati in the Mahabharata appears in a more subdued form compared to her powerful and overflowing depiction in the Vedic hymns. She emerges at Plaksha (Prasravana), disappears into the sands at Vinasana, and then reemerges in several places, ultimately reaching the ocean at Prabhasa. This representation reflects an attempt to reconcile the historical drying up of the river with its continued importance in religious thought. The Mahabharata preserves the grandeur of the Saraswati River by presenting a mythologised geography that both recalls her past and reinterprets her course in accordance with Dharma. Her flow is depicted as being guided by divine will, avoiding the unrighteous and serving the pious. The epic also universalizes her identity by attributing her name to multiple rivers, reinforcing her Rig Vedic epithet saptasvasar and declaring, "all rivers are Saraswati-s."

Religiously, Saraswati's banks become lined with numerous tirthas, which are sites of pilgrimage and sacrifice. While the Panchavimsha Brahmana describes sacrificial rituals along her course, the Mahabharata expands upon this, transforming her river into a vast pilgrimage route filled with sacred sites. This shift marks a broader transition in religious practice—from complex Vedic sacrifices performed exclusively by Brahmins to more accessible devotional practices open to a wider public, including women. The act of visiting Saraswati's tirthas is often equated with the merit of Vedic sacrifices, thus preserving Vedic authority while adapting to new religious contexts.

==== As a Goddess ====
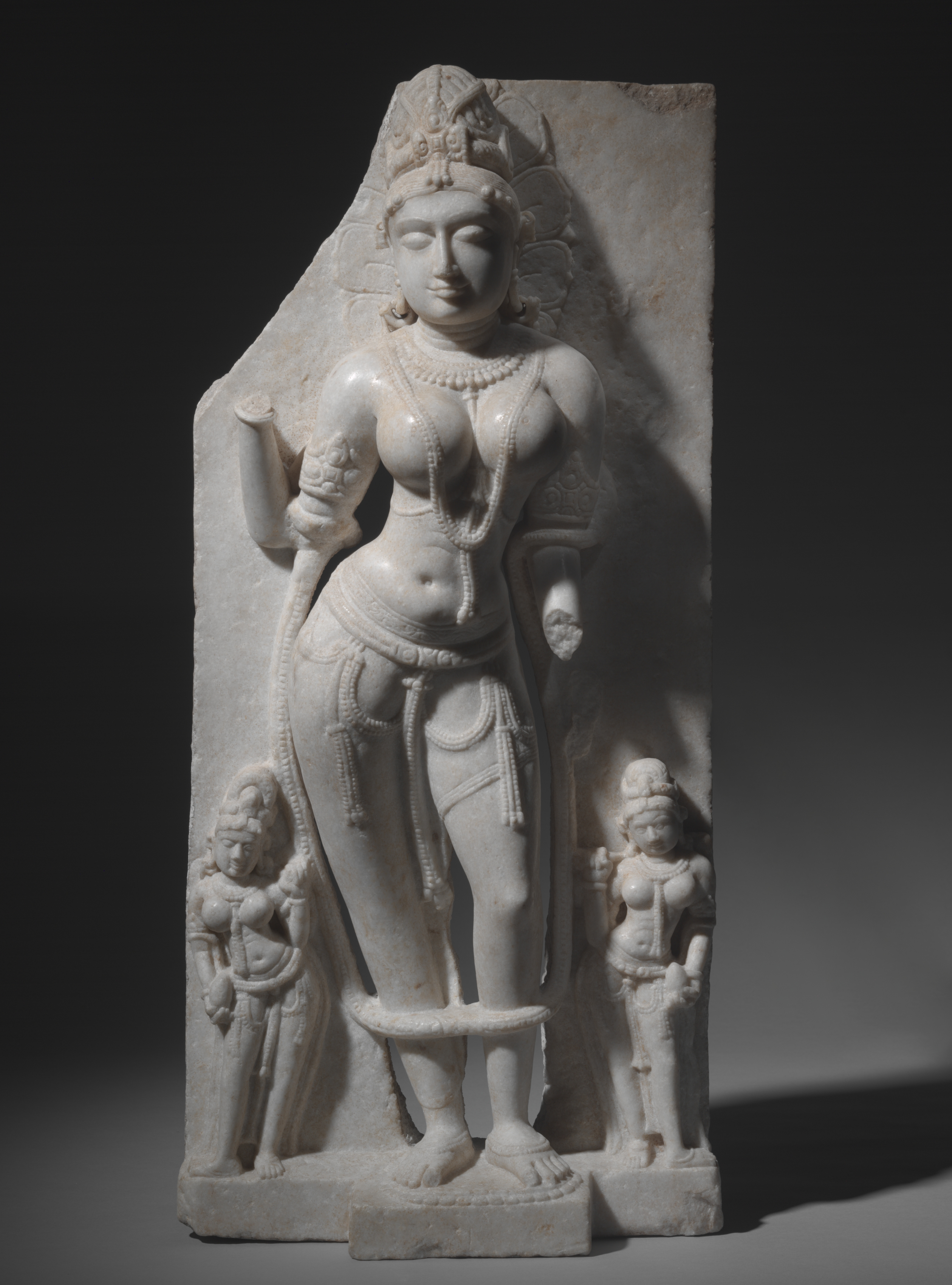
Saraswati with attendants, marble sculpture, c. 900 CE

As a goddess, Saraswati takes on a more humanized form in the Mahabharata for the first time. While the Rigveda and Brahmanas occasionally depicted Vac in human-like terms, Saraswati in the epics appears as a woman of great celestial beauty and merit. The first verse of each book of the Mahabharata invokes the divine, including Saraswati, as part of its traditional opening salutation:

nārāyaṇaṃ namaskṛtya naraṃ caiva narottamam
devīṃ sarasvatīṃ caiva tato jayam udīrayet

Translation:

Having bowed down to Narayana and Nara, the most exalted male being, and also to the goddess Saraswati, must the word success be uttered.

Her role also changes in the Mahabharata, as she fully merges with Vac, becoming the embodiment of speech itself. While still occasionally called Vac (12.306.6) and Vani (3.132.2), Vac as a distinct entity fades, with Saraswati taking its place. Saraswati is called the mother of the Vedas in the Shanti Parva Book of the epic. Narayana tells Narada (12.326.5), "Behold goddess Saraswati, the mother of the Vedas, established in me," affirming her as the source of divine knowledge. She is said to enter the body (12.306.6), dwell on the tongue (12.231.8), and is even called Vishnu's tongue (6.61.56). Saraswati is deeply revered by sages. When appearing to Yajnavalkya, she is adorned with vowels and consonants, resonating with the sacred Om (12.306.14). She also manifests before sage Tarkshya, who praises her celestial form and seeks her guidance. Here Saraswati rises from the Agnihotra to resolve priests' doubts and describes the rewards of offerings, purity through Vedic knowledge, the origins of beauty, Moksha (salvation), study, gifts, vows and yoga as well as the celestial realms and the cosmic tree of paradise.

Saraswati also gains divine relationships that further integrate her into the Hindu pantheon. In the Mahabharata, her familial roles and origin vary across different chapters. She is described as the daughter of Brahma, (ṛtā brahmasutā sā me satyā devī saraswatī, 12.330.10) a connection echoing Vac's relationship with Prajapati in the Brahmanas. Another account states that she originated from the Grandfather's (Pitamaha's) Lake, (pitāmahasya sarasaḥ pravṛttāsi saraswatī, 9.41.29) reinforcing her link to Brahma, who is referred to as the Grandfather. In another passage, she is described as the celestial creative symphony who appeared when Brahma created the universe. Her husband varies in different chapters—she is said to be the wife of Manu (5.115.14) and also of the king Matinara of Lunar dynasty, whom she chooses after his twelve-year sacrifice on her banks (1.90.25–26), bearing him a son, Tamsu, from whom the Kurus descended. Additionally, she acts as a surrogate mother to Sarasvata, a son of sage Dadhichi (9.50.9-11).

The Mahabharata also contains several stories featuring Saraswati. In the Sthanu Tirtha myth (9.42), Saraswati, caught between two rival sages—Vishvamitra and Vasishtha—favours Vasishtha and is ultimately cursed by Vishvamitra to flow with blood. This myth aims to glorify her tirthas, as later, sages purify her waters, depriving demons who had drunk from them. In compassion, Saraswati transforms into Aruna ("reddish"), allowing the demons to bathe in her and attain heaven. In the Sarasvata Tirtha myth (9.50.9-11), Saraswati plays a maternal role, raising Sarasvata. During a twelve-year drought, when sages had forgotten the Vedas, Saraswati sustained her son by feeding him fish. After the famine, Sarasvata restored the lost scriptures by teaching them anew, reaffirming Saraswati's role as a nurturer of wisdom.

=== Ramayana ===
In contrast to the Mahabharata, the epic Ramayana has lesser mentions of Saraswati and the term appears primarily in passages that are generally regarded by scholar as later redaction rather than part of the earliest stratum of the Ramayana. Saraswati as the name of a river occurs only once in the Kishkindha Kanda (Critical Edition 4.39.2), where it appears among the eastern regions to be searched for the heroine Sita. As a goddess, she is mentioned in the Bala, Yuddha and Uttara Kandas. In the Bala Kanda (1.2), Brahma declares that the poet Valmiki's speech (Saraswati) has arisen through his divine will. In the Yuddha Kanda (6.105.63), the goddess Saraswati is said to dwell upon the hero Rama's tongue, although this chapter is widely recognised as a later interpolation. The most major appearance is in the Uttara Kanda (7.10)—the latest among the Kandas composed c. 500 CE—where Saraswati appears as Brahma's consort and is described as deluding the rakshasa (demon) Kumbhakarna into requesting the boon of prolonged sleep instead of invincibility.

=== Puranic literature ===
Saraswati remains an important figure in the later medieval Puranic literature, where she appears in various myths and stories. Many Puranas relate the myth of her creation by the creator god Brahma and then describe how she became his consort. Sources which describe this myth include Markandeya Purana, Matsya Purana (which contains the most extensive account), Vayu Purana and Brahmanda Purana. Other Puranas give her slightly different roles and see her as the consort of other gods, such as Vishnu. In various Puranas, rites for her worship are given, and she is mainly worshiped for her command over speech, knowledge, and music.

Puranas like the Matsya also contain iconographic descriptions of Saraswati, which provide the basis for her classic four armed form holding a book (representing the Vedas), mala, veena, and a water pot while being mounted on a swan (hamsa).

==== Origin myths ====
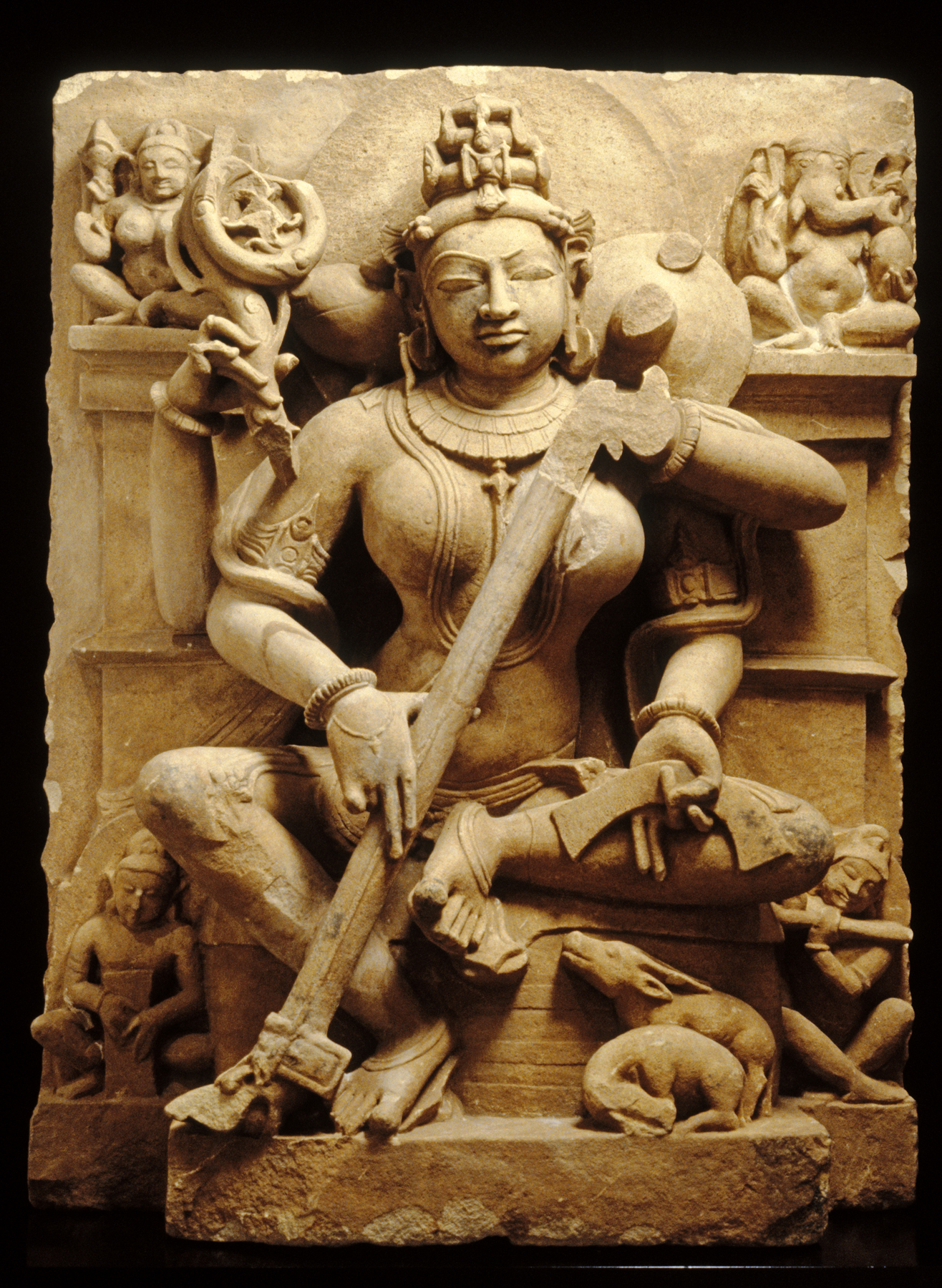
Saraswati playing veena, stone sculpture, 10th century CE

Saraswati is described as ayonija, meaning that she was not born from any womb and was divinely manifested. The Puranas present various accounts of the origin (samudbhava) of Saraswati.

According to the Brahma Vaivarta Purana and Devi Bhagavata Purana, Saraswati is one of five primary manifestations of Mula Prakrti (Primordial Nature) or the Shakti of Brahman, each serving a distinct role in creation. At the onset of creation, the Atman divided into two—its right half became the Male principle, and the left half became Prakrti. Through the divine will of Sri Krishna (Para-Brahman in this context, not an avatara of Vishnu), Prakrti assumed five forms: Durga, Radha, Lakshmi, Saraswati, and Savitri. Saraswati, associated with the mythological Saraswati River, became the goddess of speech (Vach) and knowledge. Another version within the same Puranas describes Saraswati emerging from the tip of Sri Krishna's Shakti during creation. She appeared as a luminous maiden (Kanya), adorned in yellow garments, bearing a veena and a sacred scripture. She is thus revered as Vani, the presiding deity of all shastras. This account also depicts Shakti manifesting as Lakshmi and Radha.

The Vayu Purana offers a different perspective, stating that from Brahma's concentrated anger, a being (Purusha) was born with a half-male, half-female body. This being, Samkara, was commanded to divide itself. The Male aspect further divided into eleven Rudras, while the Female aspect split into a white and black form. Saraswati is identified as a manifestation of the white half, also known as Gauri. Another account in the Vayu Purana describes Saraswati's emergence during the Visvarupa Kalpa, when Brahma meditated and Saraswati, encompassing all forms, appeared as a divine gau (cow) with four mouths, four horns, four eyes, four hands, and four teeth—symbolizing Prakrti, the primordial source of the universe (jagadyonih).

The Brahmanda Purana, in its Lalitopakhyana section, narrates that Goddess Tripura Sundari created three cosmic eggs. From one egg emerged Saraswati (Gira) along with Shiva, while the others birthed two divine pairs: Ambika and Vishnu from one, and Sri (Lakshmi) and Brahma from the other. Tripura Sundari then paired Saraswati with Brahma, Ambika with Shiva, and Sri with Vishnu, forming divine consorts. A similar account appears in the Pradhanika Rahasya of the Devi Mahatmya (part of the Markandeya Purana). Here, Mahalaksmi embodies the three gunas (cosmic qualities), manifesting as Mahakali (tamasika), Mahasaraswati (sattvika), and herself (rajasika). Each created a divine pair: Mahalaksmi created Brahma and Sri (Lakshmi), Mahakali created Rudra and Trayi (Saraswati), and Mahasaraswati created Vishnu and Uma (Parvatirasvati was then given to Brahma, Gauri to Rudra, and Sri to Vishnu.

The Matsya Purana (Adhyaya 3) describes Saraswati as the manasa putri (mind-born daughter) of Brahma. When Brahma sought to create the universe, he meditated, causing his body to split into a male and female half. The female half materialized as Saraswati, whom Brahma regarded as his svatmaja (daughter born from his own self). Other Puranas, including the Bhagavata Purana, Brahmanda Purana, Brahma Purana, Padma Purana, and Skanda Purana, also mention Saraswati in this capacity.

==== Association with Brahma ====
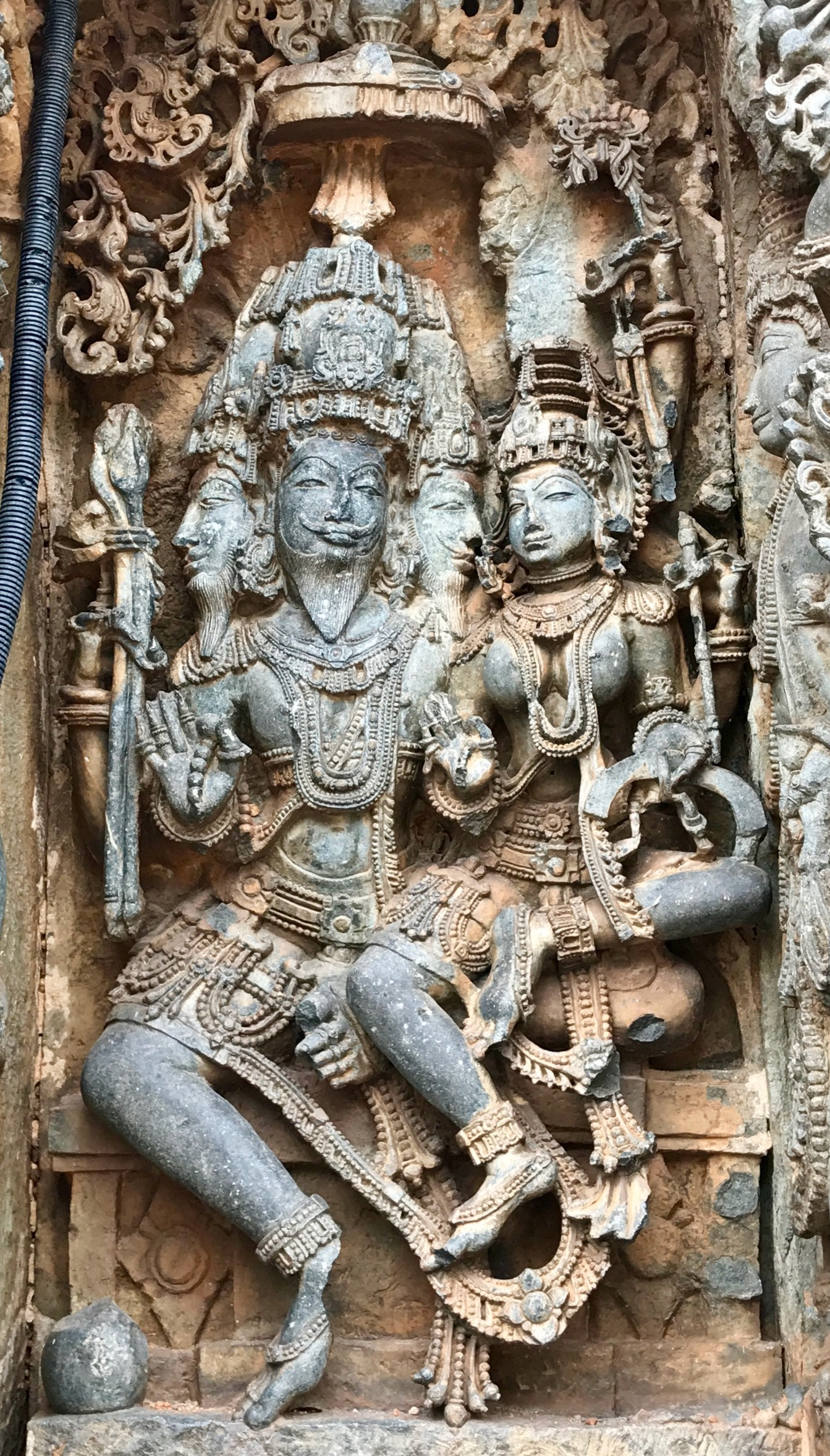
12th-century Brahma and Saraswati as a couple at Hoysaleswara Temple, Halebidu, Karnataka, India.

Saraswati and Brahma share a complex and multifaceted relationship in the Puranic tradition, with different texts presenting varying perspectives. The Puranas describe three primary associations between them:

- Saraswati solely as the mind-born daughter of Brahma, attested in the Brahma Purana, Padma Purana, Brahmanda Purana and few chapters of Skanda Purana
- Saraswati as solely the consort of Brahma, attested in the Brahma Vaivarta Purana, Devi Bhagavata Purana, Lalitopakhyana, Pradhana Rahasya and few chapters of Skanda Purana
- Saraswati as both the daughter and spouse of Brahma, found in two text—the Matsya Purana and Bhagavata Purana

As the mind-born daughter of Brahma, Saraswati, in the Brahma Purana, Padma Purana, and Skanda Purana, is regarded as a virgin goddess, without any spouse. The birth of Saraswati from the mind of Brahma is also described in the Brahmanda Purana (chapter 43), in which after her creation Saraswati is tasked to reside on tip of the tongue of all beings, a river on the earth and as a part of Brahma. The Brahmanda Purana acknowledges her solely as Brahma's daughter but, in the Lalitopakhyana section of the text, a different origin is given to Saraswati in which Goddess Tripurasundari created and gave Saraswati to Brahma as his consort.

The accounts where Saraswati is solely considered Brahma's consort, found in the Brahma Vaivarta Purana, states that Saraswati was originally created from the tip of the tongue of the Shakti (Yosit) of Sri Krishna (Supreme God in this context, not an avatara of Vishnu). Krishna gave her to Vishnu as his wife, but after a quarrel with her co-wife Ganga, Vishnu transferred Saraswati to Brahma and Ganga to Shiva. The Devi Bhagavata Purana contains similar story. The Lalitopakhyana and Pradhana Rahasya mention that Saraswati was created by Tripura Sundari and given to Brahma as his wife.

In narratives where Saraswati is depicted as both the daughter and spouse, the portrayal varies. The Matsya Purana narrates that Saraswati emerged from the left side of his body for the purpose of creation. Brahma, upon seeing Saraswati, was captivated by her beauty and developed multiple heads to gaze her. Despite her initial reluctance, she consented and he made her his spouse, and they remained together in the lotus temple for a hundred divine years. From their union, Svayambhuva Manu—the first mortal human—was born. After that, Brahma felt shame, curses the love-god Kama and his sons are left to create the world. In the Matsya Purana, while Brahma is criticised for his actions, the union is also justified, as human logic cannot be directly applied to divine beings, particularly when creation is at stake. In the Bhagavata Purana, the marriage of Brahma and Saraswati is explained in a way that avoids direct filial relations. According to the text, Brahma creates Saraswati and develops desire for her. However, feeling ashamed for desiring her, he gives up his life. Brahma then manifested in a different body, and he marries Saraswati, who was created by the previous Brahma.

The motif of Brahma desiring his own daughter is a recurrent theme in the Puranic tradition, potentially derived from the Brahmanical myth of Prajapati's desire for Ushas. However, the identity of the daughter in these narratives is not consistently Saraswati and varies. This desire is generally depicted as transient, with Brahma either overcoming it himself out of shame, by cursing Kama, being restrained by Shiva—paralleling the Vedic account of Rudra restraining Prajapati—or facing the daughter's outright refusal, resulting in no union. A notable instance occurs in the Shiva Purana, where Saraswati rejects Brahma's advances, curses him, and subsequently departs.

Another symbolic representation of Saraswati's association with Brahma is the belief that she resides in his mouth. This concept appears in several Puranas, including the Padma Purana, where Vishnu praises Saraswati as residing in Brahma's mouth. A similar reference is found in the Matsya Purana, where Gauri is praised in the same manner. A direct reference to this belief appears in the Saraswati Rahasya Upanishad, which describes Sarawati as a divine swan residing in the lotus-mouth of the four-faced Brahma.

==== Saraswati, Savitri and Gayatri ====
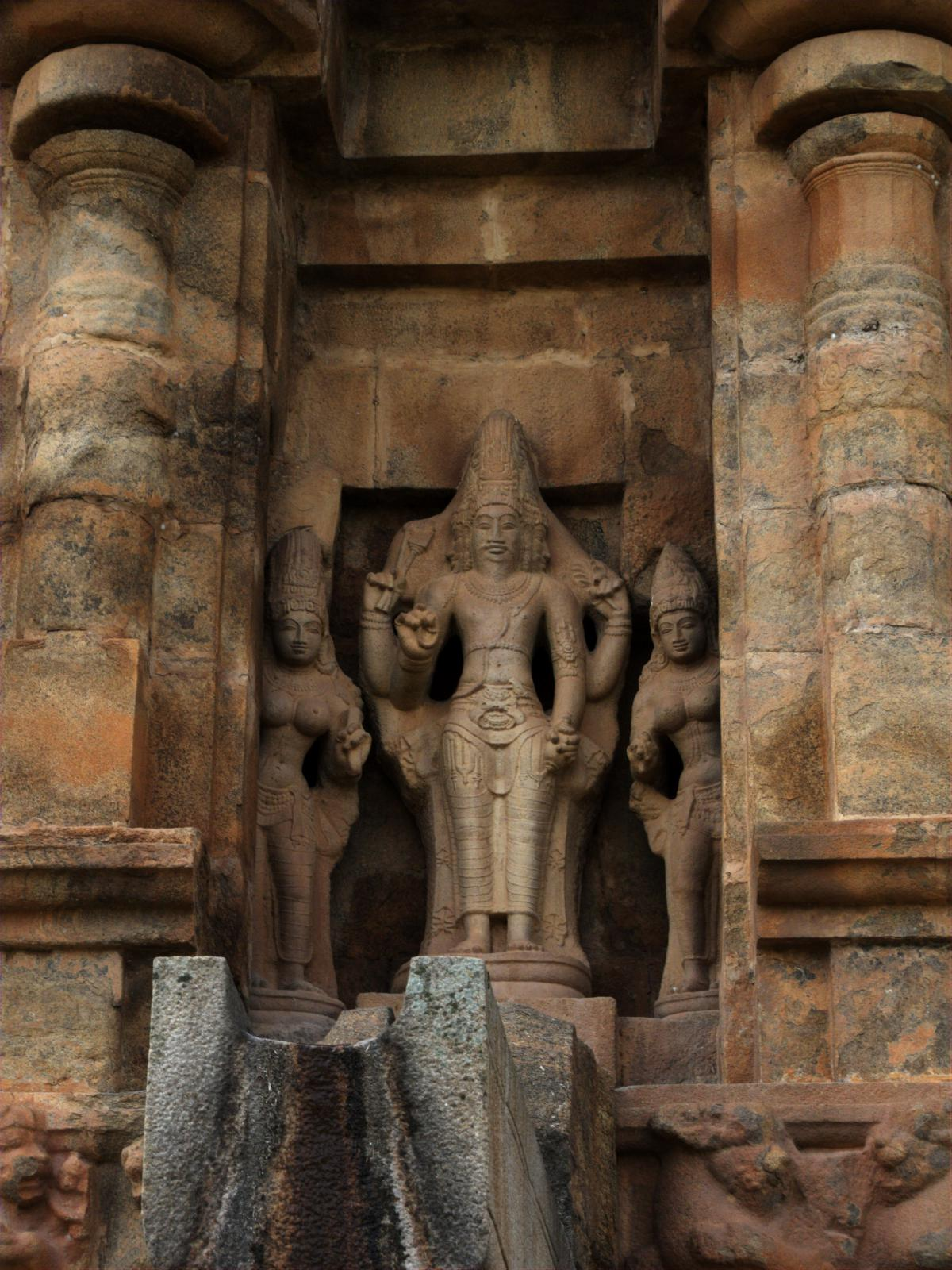
Sculpture of Brahma with Savitri (Gayatri) and Saraswati

The goddesses Saraswati, Savitri, and Gayatri are closely associated with Brahma and one another in the Puranas, but their connection is very inconsistent. Some texts consider these three goddesses to be identical. According to the Matsya Purana (Adhyayas 3, 4), Saraswati, Savitri, Gayatri, Brahmani and Shatarupa are different names of the same deity. The Matsya Purana (Adhyaya 66) and Padma Purana (V.22.176–194) state that Saraswati and Gayatri are interchangeable names for the same goddess. Similarly, in the Skanda Purana (VI.46), both Gayatri and Savitri are listed as synonyms of Saraswati, although the same text also mention Savitri and Gayatri as distinct individual. The Varaha Purana also considers Saraswati, Savitri and Gayatri to be the same.

Other Puranic texts treat Saraswati, Savitri, and Gayatri as three separate deities:

- The Brahma Purana lists them among the five daughters of Brahma.
- In the Padma Purana and Skanda Purana, Gayatri and Savitri are described as female companions of Saraswati.
- The Padma Purana also describes Saraswati as Brahma's virgin daughter, while Savitri and Gayatri are mentioned as his wives. According to this narrative, Brahma had two consorts—Savitri and Gayatri. When Savitri failed to arrive for a ritual at Pushkara, Brahma wed Gayatri in her absence to complete the ritual. In response, Savitri, feeling aggrieved, pronounced a curse restricting his worship to Pushkara, though she later reconciled with Gayatri, establishing a harmonious relationship. Similar account is found in the Skanda Purana, where the two wives are Savitri and Gayatri and are not connected to Saraswati.

In certain texts, Gayatri is called the "Mother of the Vedas" (Taittiriya Pratishakhya 17.308d–309a), while Savitri is also described as "the mother of the four Vedas" (Brahma Purana II.1.39c). Saraswati, in turn, is regarded as "the presiding deity of knowledge" (ibid. 31b) and "the embodiment of all branches of learning" (ibid. 31c). Thus, similar to the Vedic goddesses Bharati and Ila, Saraswati, Savitri, and Gayatri are all connected to the domain of knowledge (vidya, jnana, Veda).

In a third category of accounts, Savitri is identified with one of the two while remaining distinct from the other. In certain traditions, Savitri is identified with Gayatri, as seen in the Devi Bhagavata Purana, where Saraswati and Savitri are enumerated among the five Prakritis. Conversely, select chapters of the Skanda Purana equate Savitri with Saraswati, thereby positioning Gayatri as her co-wife. A chapter in the Skanda Purana also recounts a myth featuring both Saraswati and Gayatri. It narrates about Brahma's infatuation with his daughter Vac (a rare instance where Vac is distinguished from Saraswati in the Puranic corpus). As a consequence of this transgression, Brahma was slain by Shiva, only to be later revived through the penance of Saraswati and Gayatri.

==== Association with Vishnu ====
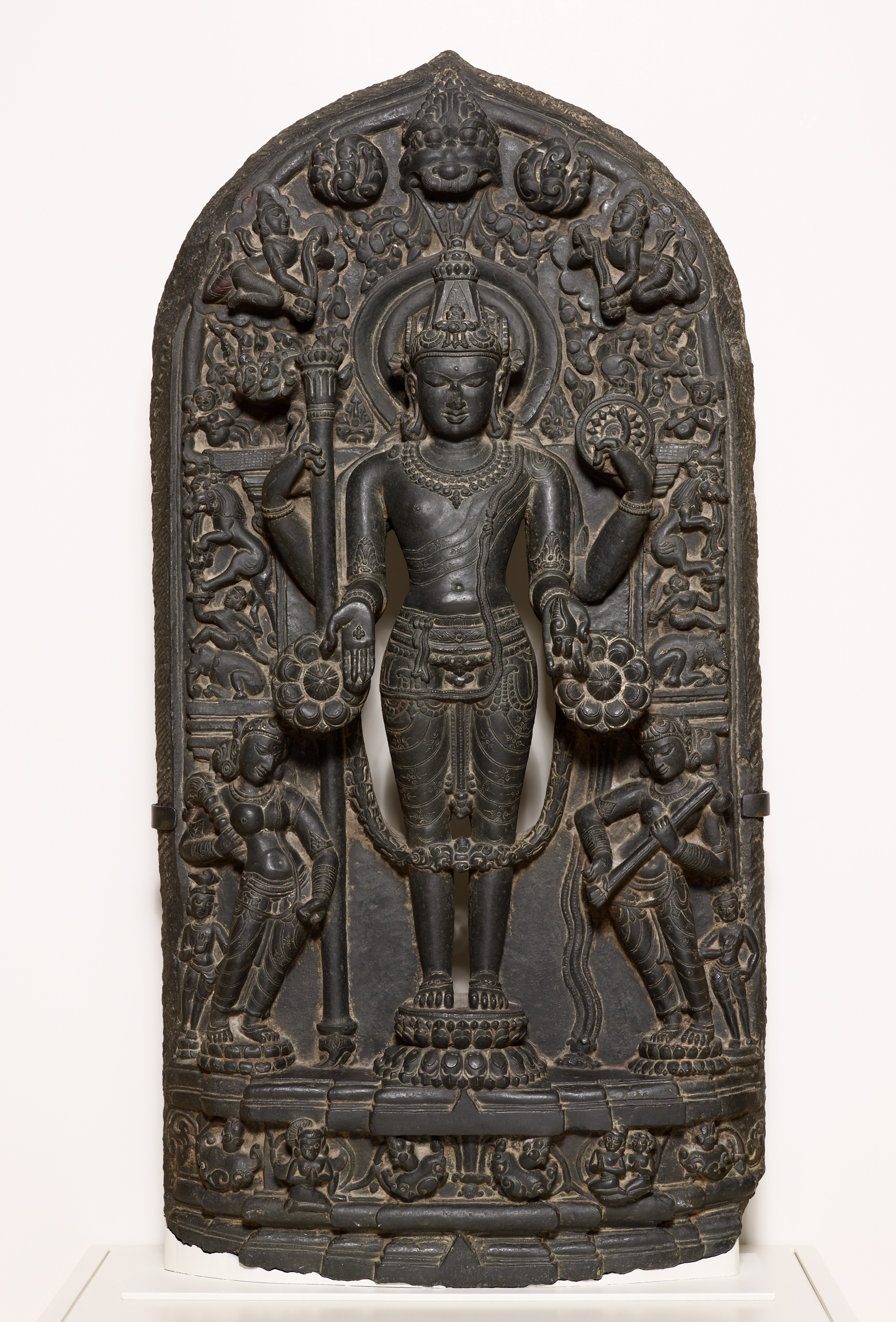
A sculpture of Vishnu with goddesses Lakshmi (left) and Saraswati (right), from current-day Bangladesh at the Chicago Art Institute.

Other than Brahma, Saraswati has also been associated with the preserver god Vishnu, a connection which might stem established connection of Saraswati and Indra from the Rigveda (VI.49.7). In many sculpture of Vishnu common during mediaeval era, particularly in the region of Bengal, Saraswati replaces Bhumi as his second wife, making Saraswati the co-wife of the goddess Lakshmi. Both of these goddesses flank Vishnu and assist him his role.

However, conjugal relationship between Saraswati and Vishnu is rarely found elsewhere in the Puranas—barring two. According to the Brahma Vaivarta Purana (II.6) and Devi Bhagavata Purana (IX.6), Saraswati was initially the wife of Narayana or Vishnu. In the Devi Bhagavata Purana, Saraswati is described as one of Vishnu's three wives, alongside Lakshmi and Ganga. A conflict arose when Saraswati, angered by Ganga's playful glances at Vishnu, accused her of stealing his affection. Vishnu remained neutral, while Lakshmi attempted to mediate. In her jealousy, Saraswati cursed Lakshmi to be born as the Tulasi plant. In retaliation, Ganga cursed Saraswati to become a river, and Saraswati reciprocated with the same curse, declaring that sinners would cleanse their sins in Ganga's waters. Vishnu then decreed that Saraswati would exist in three forms: one part with him, another as a river on earth, and the third as Brahma's consort.

If Saraswati is not associated with Vishnu as his wife, then concept of Saraswati as "the tongue of Vishnu" gained prominence in the Puranas. The Matsya Purana states that when Vamana assumed his cosmic form, Satya became his speech, and Saraswati became his tongue (Matsya Purana 246.57). The Vamana Purana also refers to Saraswati as "the tongue of Vishnu" (Vamana Purana 32.23). The Brahma Purana describes Vishnu as "holding Saraswati in his mouth" (Brahma Purana 122.71c).

==== Puranic Narratives of Saraswati's River Aspect ====
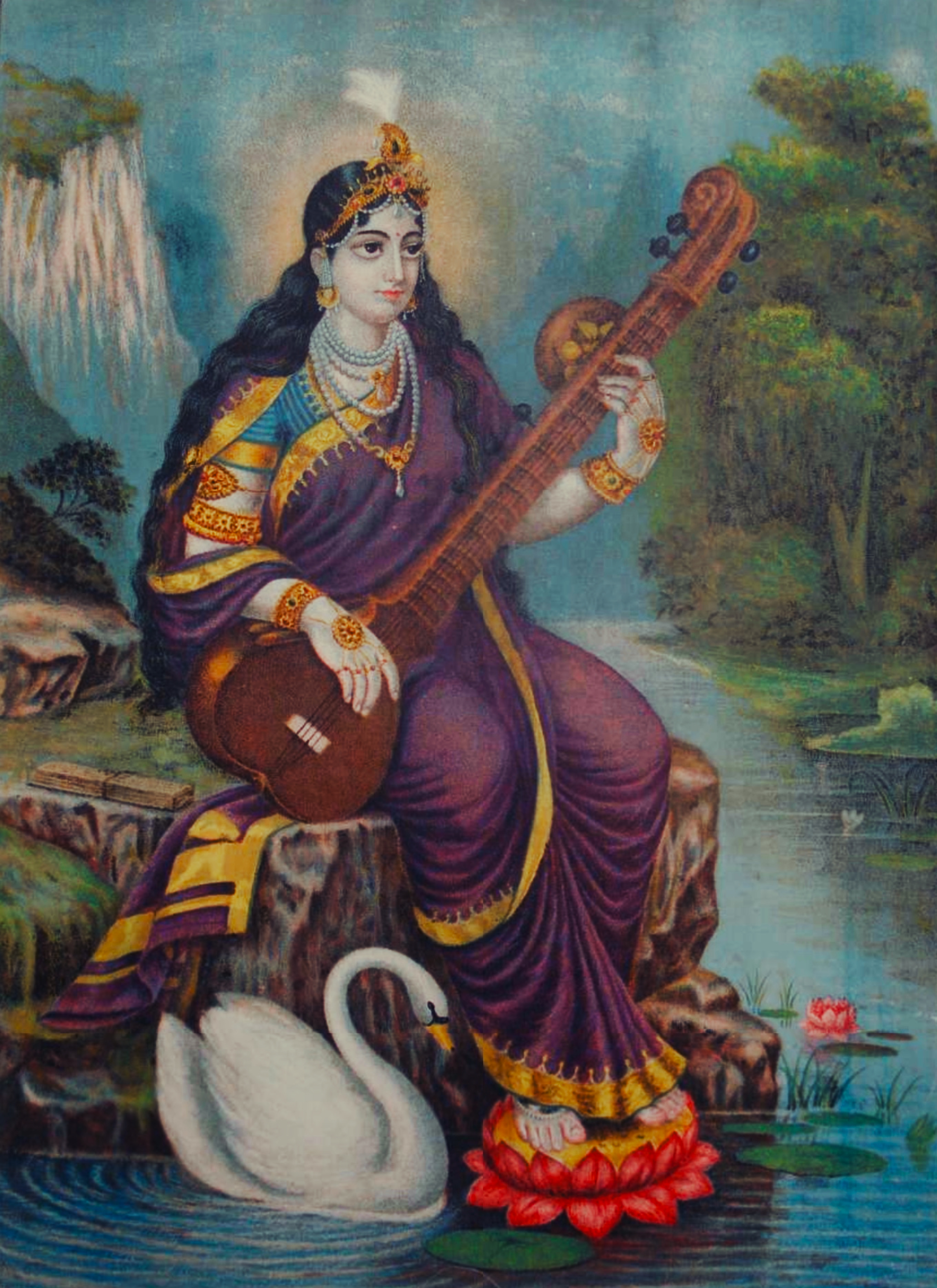
Depiction of Saraswati from a market in Bengal (19th century, pre-1895 CE). The British Library curator's summary states, "Saraswati, the goddess of learning and knowledge, is seated on the banks of a river. Her feet rest on a lotus flower, a palm leaf manuscript to represent the vedas is next to her and she holds a vina. Her mount, a swan, is positioned nearby."

In the Rigveda, Saraswati is primarily depicted as a river goddess, embodying fertility and purity, and is revered as the personification of the Saraswati River. Her role as the nurturing, life-giving force of the river is celebrated in hymns, where she is described as "the best of mothers, of rivers, and of goddesses." A Rigvedic prayer also describes her as 'the best of mothers, of rivers and of goddesses'. However, as Saraswati's association with knowledge, speech, and culture grew in prominence through the later Hindu texts, her direct connection with the physical river diminished. Despite this, the Puranas sustain Saraswati's riverine character by incorporating new narratives that preserve her role as a cosmic river in addition to her expanded identity.

The story of Saraswati becoming a river is introduced in the Srishti Khanda of Padma Purana as well as in Skanda Purana. In the Skanda Purana, after the events of the Tarakamaya War, the devas deposited their arsenal of weapons at the hermitage of Dadhichi. When they sought the return of these weapons, the sage informed them that he had imbibed all of their power with his penance, and offered his own bones instead, which could serve as the source of new weapons. Despite the objections of the deities, the sage sacrificed himself, and his bones were employed in the manufacture of new arms by Vishvakarma. The sage's son, Pippalada, upon hearing these events, sought to wreak his vengeance on the devas by performing a penance. A mare emerged from his right thigh, which in turn gave birth to a fiery man, Vadava, who threatened to be the doom of all of creation. Vishnu convinced Vadava that his best course of action would be to swallow the devas one by one, and that he should begin by consuming the primordial water of creation, which was the foremost of both the devas and the asuras. Vadava wished to be accompanied to the source of these waters by a virgin, and so Saraswati was dispatched for his purpose, despite her reluctance. She took him to Varuna, the god of the ocean, who then consumed the being. For good measure, Saraswati transformed into a divine river, flowing with five channels into the sea, making the waters sacred.

In the Padma Purana, it is stated that there was a terrible battle between the Bhargavas (a group of Brahmanas) and the Hehayas (a group of Kshatriyas). From this, an all-consuming fire called Vadavagni was born, which threatened to destroy the whole world. In some versions, a sage named Auva created it. Indra, Vishnu, and the devas visited Saraswati, requesting her to deposit the fire in the western ocean, to protect the universe. Saraswati told Vishnu that she would only agree to assist them if her consort, Brahma, told her to do so. Brahma ordered her to deposit the Vadavagni in the western ocean. Saraswati agreed, and accompanied by Ganga, she left Brahmaloka, and arrived at Sage Uttanka's ashrama. There, she met Shiva, who had decided to carry Ganga. He gave the Vadavagni in a pot to Saraswati, and told her to originate from the plaksha tree. Saraswati merged with the tree, and transformed into a river. From there, she flowed towards Pushkara. Saraswati continued her journey towards the ocean, and stopped once at Pushkarini, where she redeemed humans from their sins. At last, she reached the end of her journey, and immersed the fire into the ocean.

=== Shakta texts ===
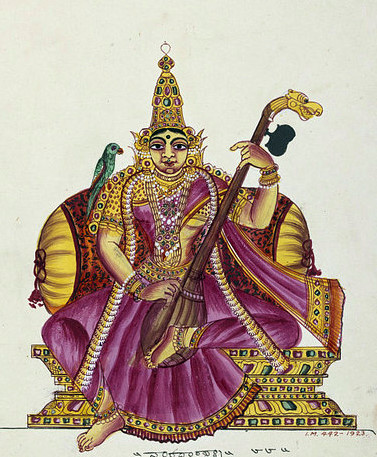
19th century South Indian painting of Raja-Matangi with veena and parrot

Saraswati is a key figure in the Indian goddess centered traditions which are today known as Shaktism. Saraswati appears in the Puranic Devi Mahatmya (Glory of the Goddess), a central text for Shaktism which was appended to the Markandeya Purana during the 6th century CE. In this text, she is part of the "triple goddess" (Tridevi) along with Mahakali, and Mahalakshmi. In Shaktism, this trinity (the Shakta response to the male trimurti of the other Hindu sects) is a manifestation of Mahadevi, the supreme goddess (and the highest deity out of which all deities, male or female, are born), which is also known by other names like Adi Parashakti ("Primordial Supreme Power").

According to the Devi Mahatmya, this supreme goddess is the primordial creator which is supreme formless (nirguna) consciousness (i.e. parabrahman, absolute reality) and the tridevi are her main saguna ("with form", manifest, incarnated) emanations. MahaSaraswati is said to be creative and active principle (which is Rajasic, energetic and active), while Mahalakshmi is the sustainer (sattvic, "goodness") and Mahakali is the destroyer (tamasic, "darkness").

In other influential Shakta texts, such as the Devi Bhagavata Purana and the Devi Upanishad, Saraswati (along with all Hindu goddesses) is also said to be a manifestation of the supreme Mahadevi.

In Tantric Shakta sources, Saraswati takes many forms. A key tantric form is Matangi, a deity considered to be the "Tantric Saraswati". Mātaṅgī retains many attributes of Saraswati, like music and learning, but is also associated with defeating enemies, disease, pollution/impurity, and outcasts (chandalas). She is often offered half eaten or leftover food and is green in color. Matangi is also part of the Shakta set of goddesses known as the ten Mahavidyas.

Matangi is important in Shri Vidya Shaktism, where she is also known as the dark blue Shyamala ("dark in complexion") and is a manifestation of Lalita Tripurasundari's Jñana Shakti (wisdom power), having arisen out of Lalita's sugarcane bow. She is celebrated in the holiday Syamala Navaratri and is seen as Lalita's prime minister. There are various chants and odes (stotras) to this deity, perhaps the most important being the Śrī Śyāmalā Daṇḍakam by the great Indian Sanskrit poet Kalidasa.

== Symbolism and iconography ==
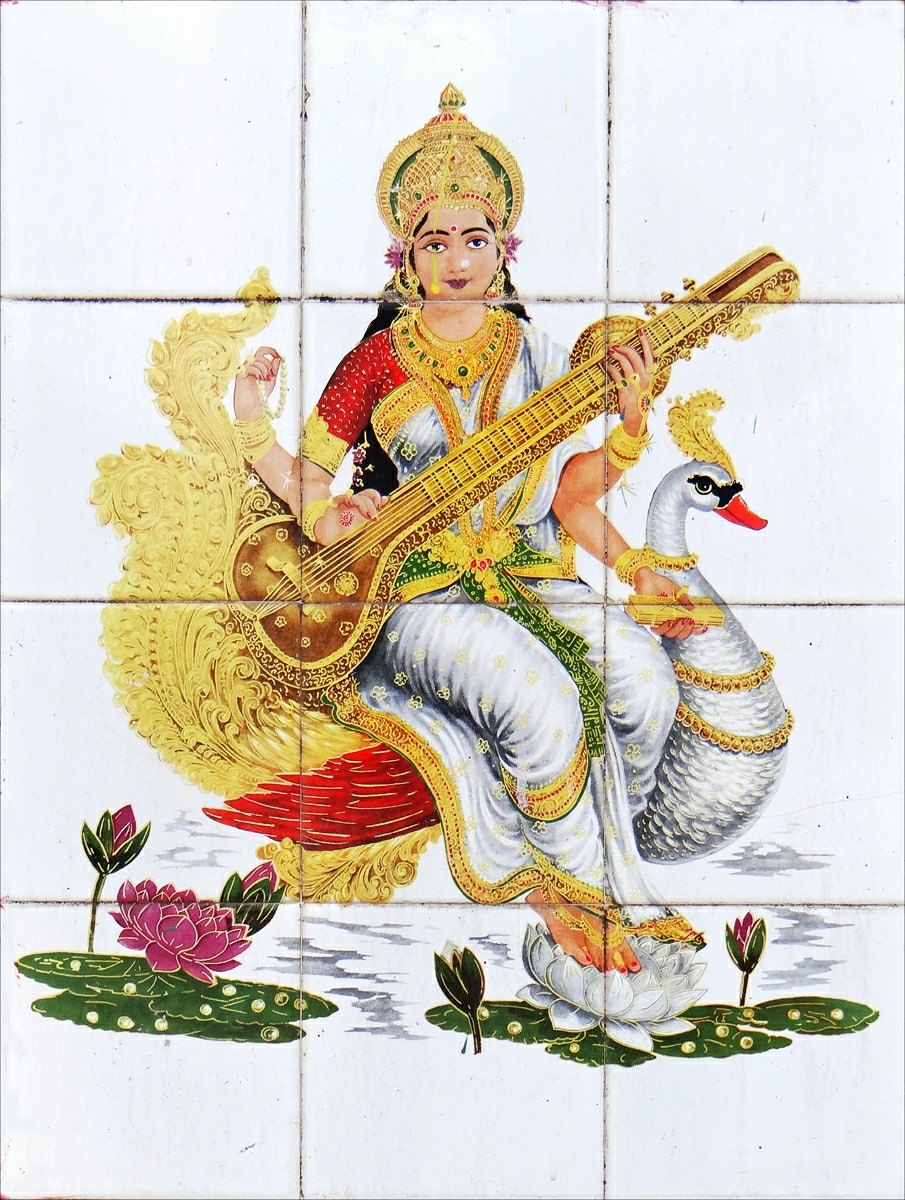
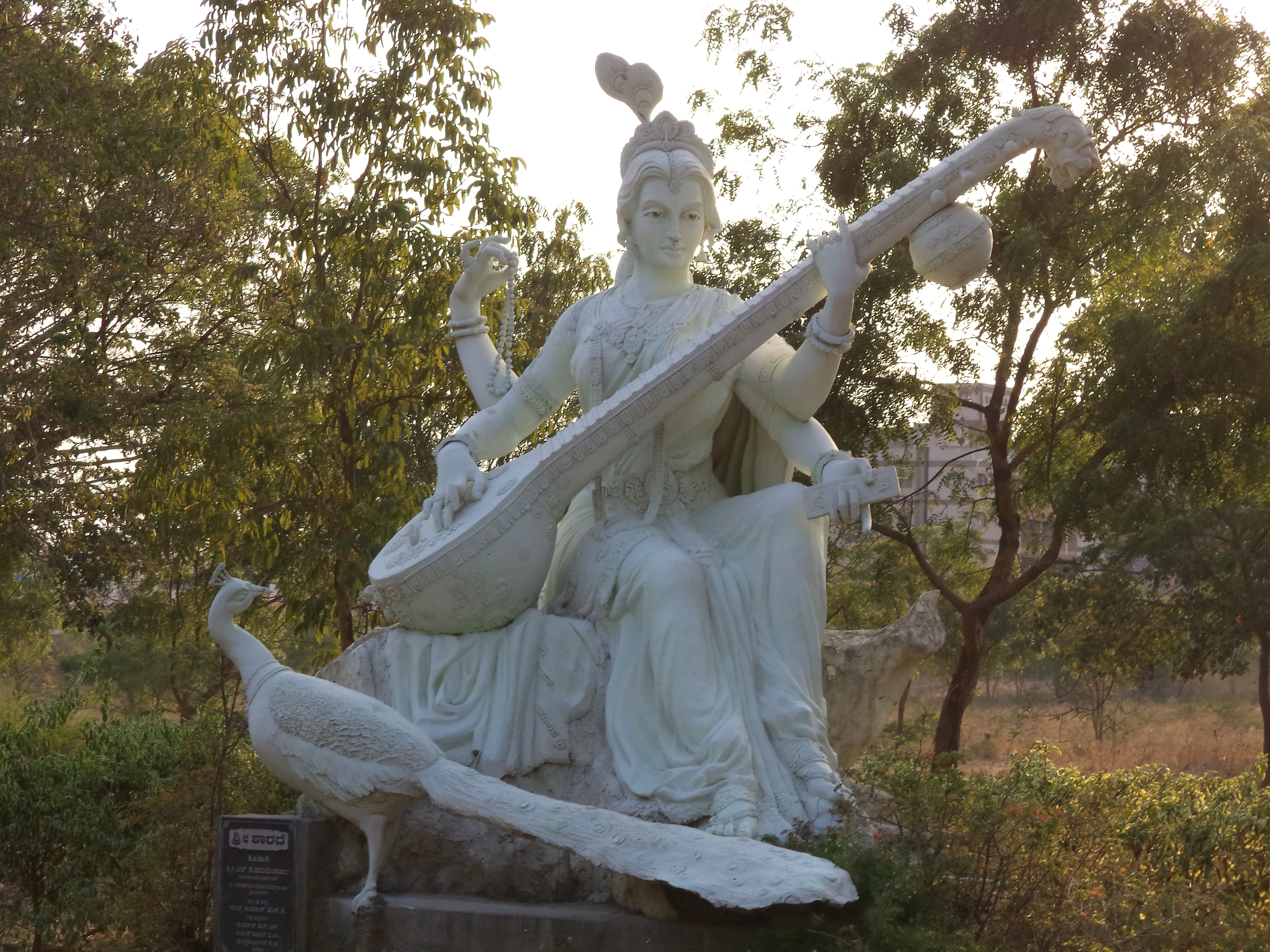
Iconography of Saraswati: the goddess depicted with her veena, swan, peacock, crystal japamala and lotus. (Two images: above, a tile mural in Kerala, below, a sculpture in cultured marble in Karnataka).

The Saraswati is often depicted as a beautiful woman dressed in pure white, often seated on a white lotus, which symbolizes light, knowledge and truth. She not only embodies knowledge but also the experience of the highest reality. Her iconography is typically in white themes from dress to flowers to swan – the colour symbolizing Sattwa Guna or purity, discrimination for true knowledge, insight and wisdom.

Her dhyana mantra describes her to be as white as the moon, clad in a white dress, bedecked in white ornaments, radiating with beauty, holding a book and a pen in her hands (the book represents knowledge).

She is generally shown to have four arms, but sometimes just two. When shown with four hands, those hands symbolically mirror her husband Brahma's four heads, representing manas (mind, sense), buddhi (intellect, reasoning), citta (imagination, creativity), and ahamkāra (self consciousness, ego). Brahma represents the abstract, while she represents action and reality.

The four hands hold items with symbolic meaning – a pustaka (book or script), a mālā (rosary, garland), a water pot and a musical instrument (vīnā). The book she holds symbolizes the Vedas representing the universal, divine, eternal, and true knowledge as well as all forms of learning. A mālā of crystals, representing the power of meditation, inner reflection, and spirituality. A pot of water represents the purifying power to separate right from wrong, the clean from the unclean, and essence from the inessential. In some texts, the pot of water is symbolism for soma – the drink that liberates and leads to knowledge. The most famous feature on Saraswati is a musical instrument called a veena, represents all creative arts and sciences, and her holding it symbolizes expressing knowledge that creates harmony. Saraswati is also associated with anurāga, the love for and rhythm of music, which represents all emotions and feelings expressed in speech or music.

A hamsa – either a swan or a goose – is often shown near her feet. In Hindu mythology, the hamsa is a sacred bird, which if offered a mixture of milk and water, is said to have a unique ability to separate and drink the milk alone, and leave the water behind. This characteristic of the bird serves as a metaphor for the pursuit of wisdom amidst the complexities of life, the ability to discriminate between good and evil, truth from untruth, essence from the outward show, and the eternal from the evanescent. Due to her association with the swan, Saraswati is also referred to as Hamsavāhini, which means "she who has a hamsa as her vehicle". The swan is also a symbolism for spiritual perfection, transcendence and moksha.

Sometimes a citramekhala (also called mayura, peacock) is shown beside the goddess. The peacock symbolizes colorful splendor, the celebration of dance, and – as the devourer of snakes – the alchemical ability to transmute the serpent poison of self into the radiant plumage of enlightenment.

== Forms and avatars ==
Many different avatars and forms of Saraswati have been attested in scriptures.

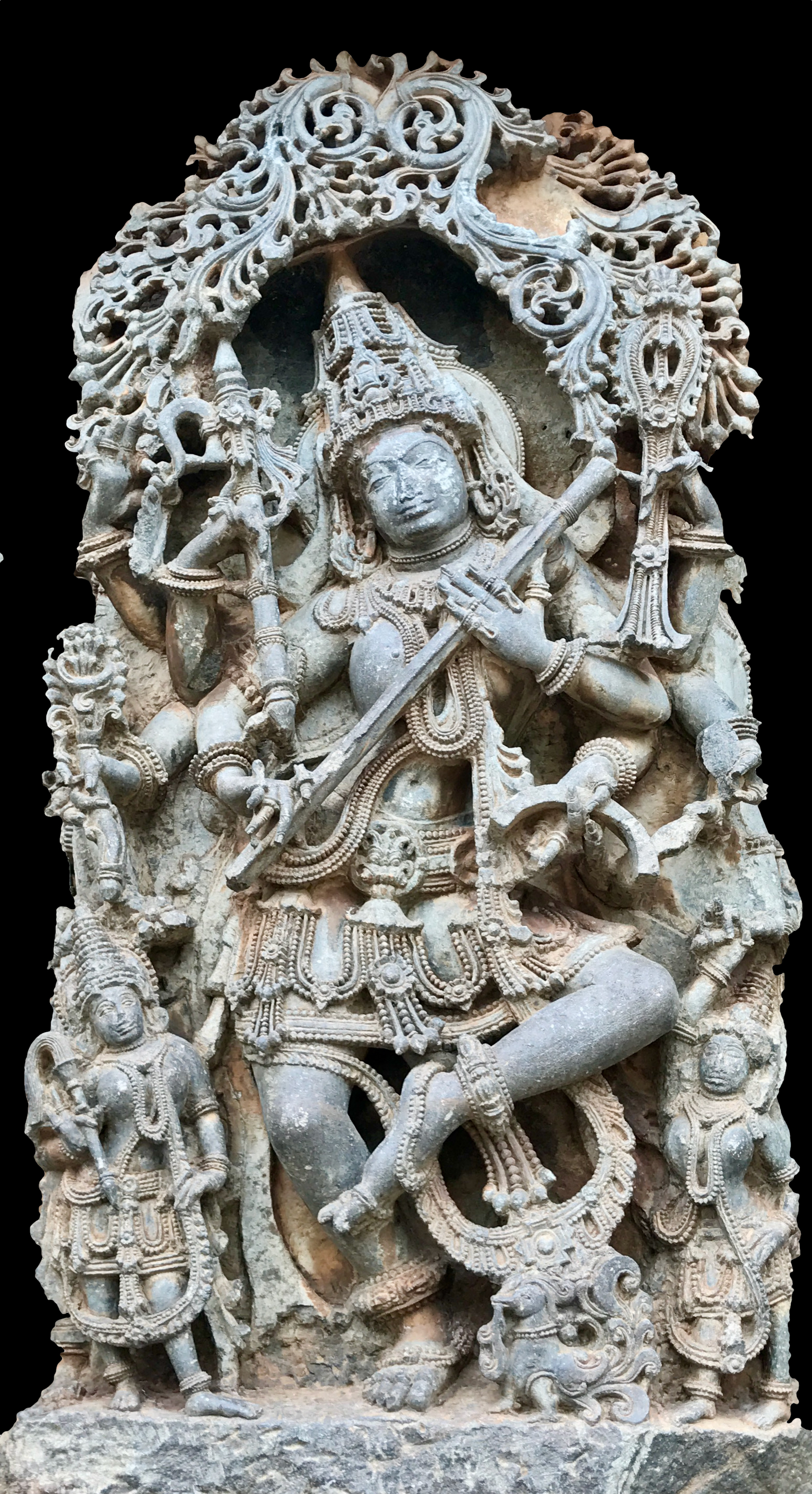
Dancing Saraswati with eight-hands (above) is depicted in three panels of the Hoysaleswara temple, Halebid Karnataka (c. 1150 CE). One of these is shown above. She is in a classical Indian dance posture, and in one of her eight hands she holds a pen, a palm leaf manuscript, a musical instrument and the tools of major arts. The shilpins thus depicted her as the goddess of knowledge and all arts.

=== Maha Saraswati ===
In some regions of India, such as Vindhya, Odisha, West Bengal and Assam, as well as east Nepal, Saraswati is part of the Devi Mahatmya Shakta mythology, in the Tridevi of Mahakali, Mahalakshmi and Maha Saraswati. This is one of many different Hindu legends that attempt to explain how the Hindu trimurti of gods (Brahma, Vishnu and Shiva) and goddesses (Saraswati, Lakshmi and Parvati) came into being. Various Purana texts offer alternate legends for Maha Saraswati.

Maha Saraswati is depicted as eight-armed and is often portrayed holding a Veena while sitting on a white lotus flower.

Her meditation verse given at the beginning of the fifth chapter the Devi Mahatmya is:

Wielding in her lotus-hands the bell, trident, ploughshare, conch, pestle, discus, bow, and arrow, her lustre is like that of a moon shining in the autumn sky. She is born from the body of Gauri and is the sustaining base of the three worlds. That Maha Saraswati I worship here who destroyed Sumbha and other asuras.

Maha Saraswati is also part of another legend, the Navshaktis (not to be confused with Navdurgas), or nine forms of Shakti, namely Brahmi, Vaishnavi, Maheshwari, Kaumari, Varahi, Narsimhi, Aindri, Shivdooti, and Chamunda, revered as powerful and dangerous goddesses in eastern India. They have special significance on Navaratri in these regions. All of these are seen ultimately as aspects of a single great Hindu goddess, Durga, with Maha Saraswati as one of those nine.

=== Mahavidya Nila Saraswati ===
In Tibet and parts of India, Nila Saraswati is sometimes considered as a form of Mahavidya Tara. Nila Saraswati is not much a different deity from traditional Saraswati, who subsumes her knowledge and creative energy in tantric literature. Though the traditional form of Saraswati is of calm, compassionate, and peaceful one: Nila Saraswati is the ugra (angry, violent, destructive) manifestation in one school of Hinduism, while the more common Saraswati is the saumya (calm, compassionate, productive) manifestation found in most others. In tantric literature of the former, Nila Saraswati has 100 names. There are separate dhyana shlokas and mantras for her worship in Tantrasara. She is worshipped in parts of India as an incarnate or incarnation of Goddess Tara but mostly outside India. She is not only worshipped but also been manifested as a form of Saraswati.

=== Sharada avatar in Kashmir ===
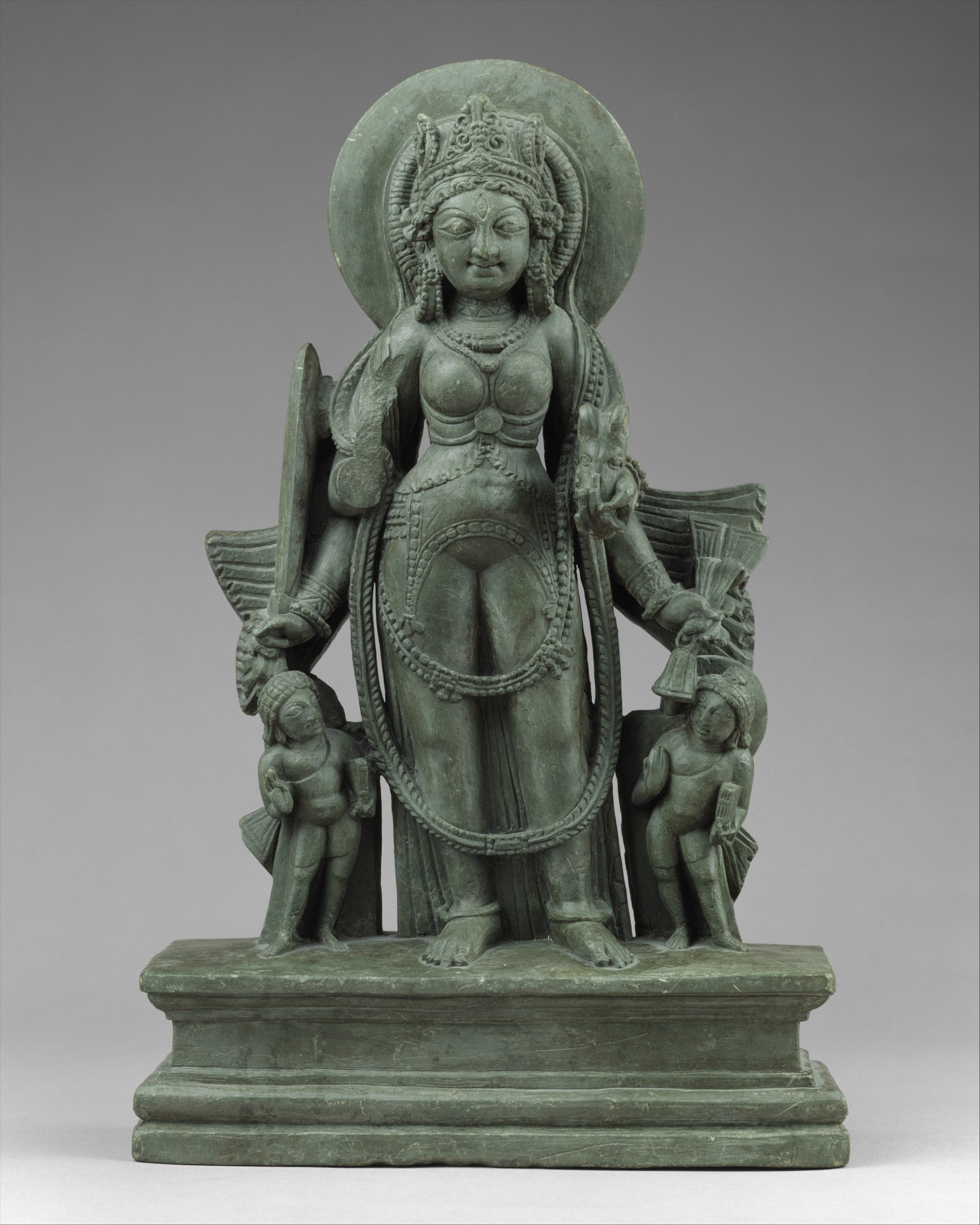
A carved idol of the crowned goddess Sharada from late-9th century Kashmir

The earliest known shrine dedicated to goddess worship in Kashmir is Sharada Peeth (6th–12th centuries CE), dedicated to the goddess Sharada. It is a ruined Hindu temple and ancient centre of learning located in present-day Azad Kashmir. The goddess Sharada worshipped in Sharada Peeth is a tripartite embodiment of the goddess Shakti: Sharada (goddess of learning), Saraswati (goddess of knowledge), and Vagdevi (goddess of speech, which articulates power). Kashmiri Pandits believe the shrine to be the abode of the goddess. In line with the Kashmiri Pandit belief that springs which are the abode of goddesses should not be looked at directly, the shrine contains a stone slab concealing the spring underneath, which they believe to be the spring in which the goddess Sharada revealed herself to the rishi Shandilya. It advanced the importance of knowledge and education in Kashmiri Pandit culture, which persisted well after Kashmiri Pandits became a minority group in Kashmir.

As one of the Maha Shakta pithas, Hindus believe that it represents the spiritual location of the goddess Sati's fallen right hand. Sharada Peeth is one of the three holiest sites of pilgrimage for Kashmiri Pandits, alongside the Martand Sun Temple and the Amarnath Temple.

== Worship ==
=== Temples ===
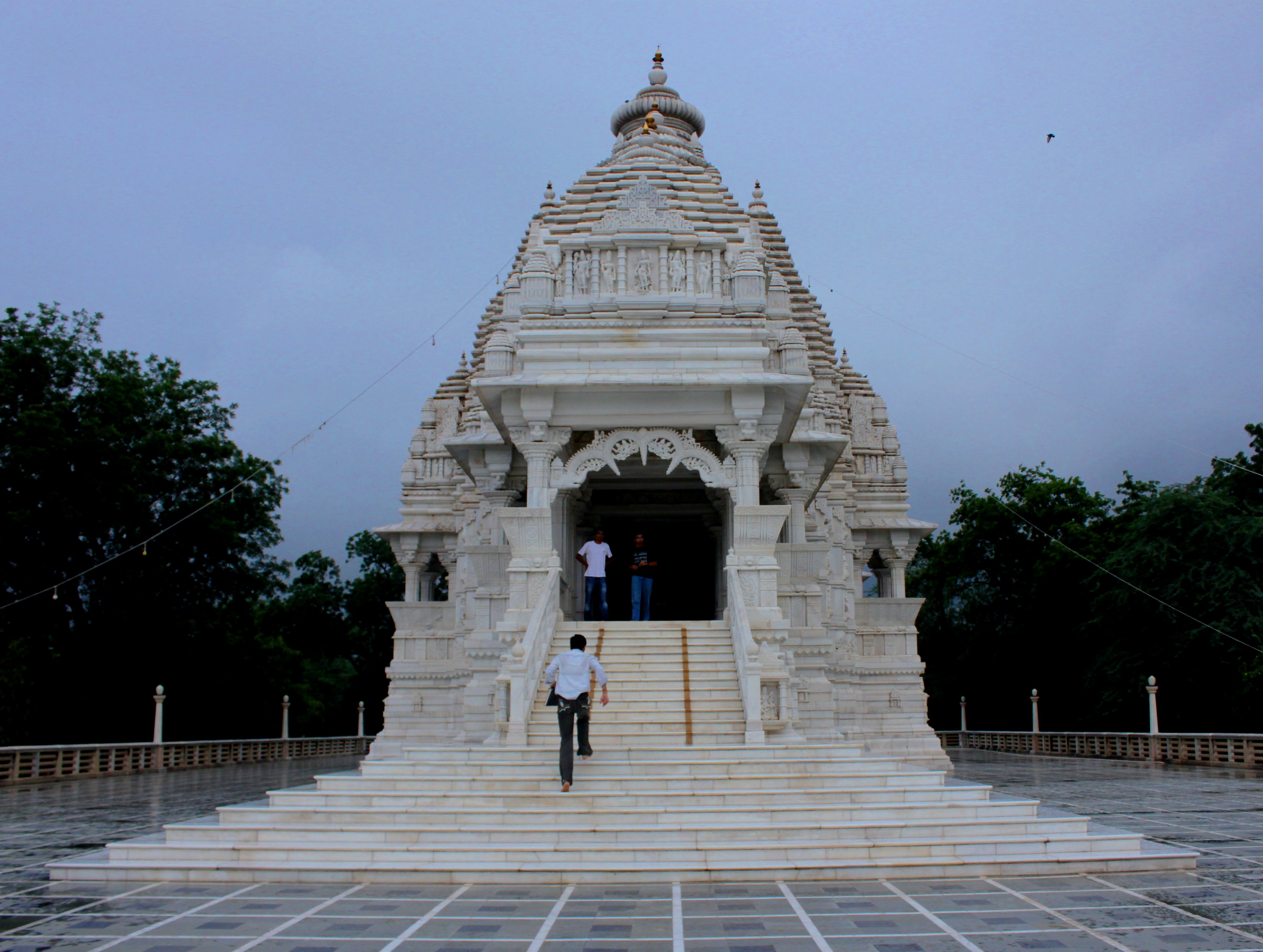
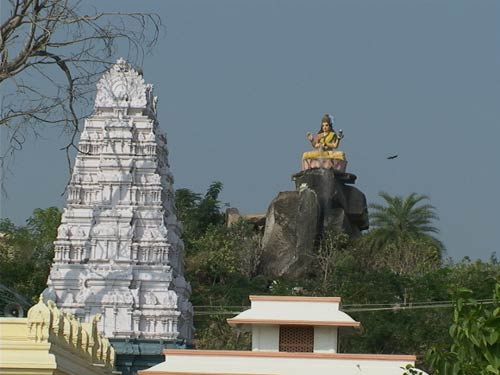
Saraswati temple at Pilani in North Indian style (above), and South Indian style (below). Her temples, like her iconography, often resonate in white themes.

There are many Hindu temples dedicated to Saraswati around the world. Some notable temples include

- Gnana Saraswati Temple in Basar on the banks of the River Godavari
- Sharada Peeth [One of the 18 Maha Shakta pithas] is dedicated to Saraswati
- Savitri Mata Mandir in Pushkar
- Saraswati Temple, Wargal, Telangana
- Saraswathi Kshetramu, Ananthasagar
- Sringeri Sharadamba Temple, Karnataka
- Mookambika Temple, Kollur
- Avanamcode Saraswathi Devi Temple(Swayambhu Bhagavathi), Kerala
- Dakshina Mookambika Temple, North Paravur
- Panachikkadu Saraswati Temple, Kerala
- Sarada Peeth, Pilani, Rajasthan
- Koothanur Maha Saraswathi Temple, in Koothanur, Tamil Nadu
- Maa Sharda Mandir, Maihar
- Shri Jnaneshwari Peeta, Karnataka
- Sarala Temple in Jagatsinghpur, Odisha
- Pura Taman Kemuda Saraswati, Indonesia
- Wargal Saraswati Temple

=== Festivals and pujas ===
One of the most famous festivals associated with Saraswati is the Hindu festival of Vasant Panchami. Celebrated on the 5th day in the Hindu calendar month of Magha, it is also known as Saraswati Puja and Saraswati Jayanti in India.

==== In south India ====
In Kerala and Tamil Nadu, the last three days of the Navaratri festival, i.e., Ashtami, Navami, and Dashami, are celebrated as Saraswati Puja.

The celebrations start with the Puja Vypu (Placing for Worship). It consists of placing the books for puja on the Ashtami day. It may be in one's own house, in the local nursery school run by traditional teachers, or in the local temple. The books are taken out for reading, after worship, only on the morning of the third day (Vijaya Dashami). It is called Puja Eduppu (Taking [from] Puja). On the Vijaya Dashami day, Kerala and Tamil Nadu celebrate the Eḻuthiniruthu or "Initiation of writing" for children, before they are admitted to nursery schools. This is also called Vidyarambham. The child is often ritually taught to write for the first time on rice spread in a plate with their index finger, guided by an elder of the family, or by a teacher.

==== In east and northeast India ====
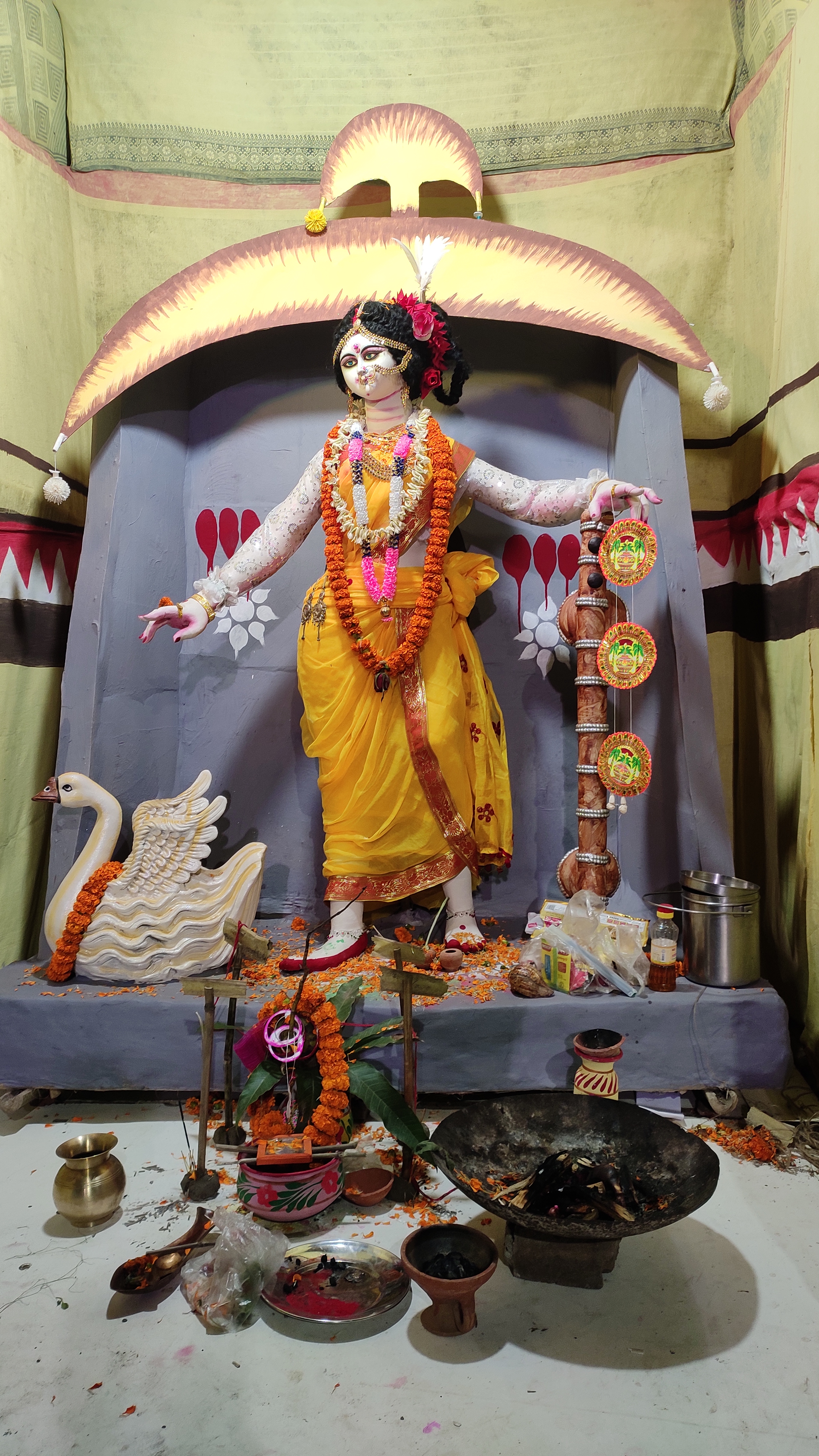
Saraswati Puja, Chandannagar, West Bengal

In Assam, Odisha, West Bengal and Tripura, Saraswati is worshipped on Vasant Panchami, a Hindu festival celebrated every year on the 5th day in the Hindu calendar month of Magha (about February). Hindus celebrate this festival in temples, homes and educational institutes alike.

==== In north, west, and central India ====
In Bihar and Jharkhand, Vasant Panchami is commonly known as Saraswati Puja. On this day, Saraswati is worshipped in schools, colleges, educational institutes as well as in institutes associated with music and dance. Cultural programmes are also organised in schools and institutes on this day. People especially students worship Saraswati also in pandals (a tent made up of colourful clothes, decorated with lights and other decorative items). In these states, on the occasion of Saraswati Puja, Saraswati is worshipped in the form of idol, made up of soil. On Saraswati Puja, the idol is worshipped by people and prasad is distributed among the devotees after puja. Prasad mainly consists of boondi (motichoor), pieces of carrot, peas and Indian plum (ber). On the next day or any day depending on religious condition, the idol is immersed in a pond (known as Murti Visarjan or Pratima Visarjan) after performing a Havana (immolation), with full joy and fun, playing with abir and gulal. After Pratima Visarjan, members involved in the organisation of puja ceremony eat khichdi together.

In Goa, Saraswati Puja starts with Saraswati Avahan on Maha Saptami and ends on Vijayadashami with Saraswati Udasan or Visarjan.

In 2018, the Haryana government launched and sponsored the annual National Saraswati Mahotsav in its state, named after Saraswati.

==== In Indonesia ====
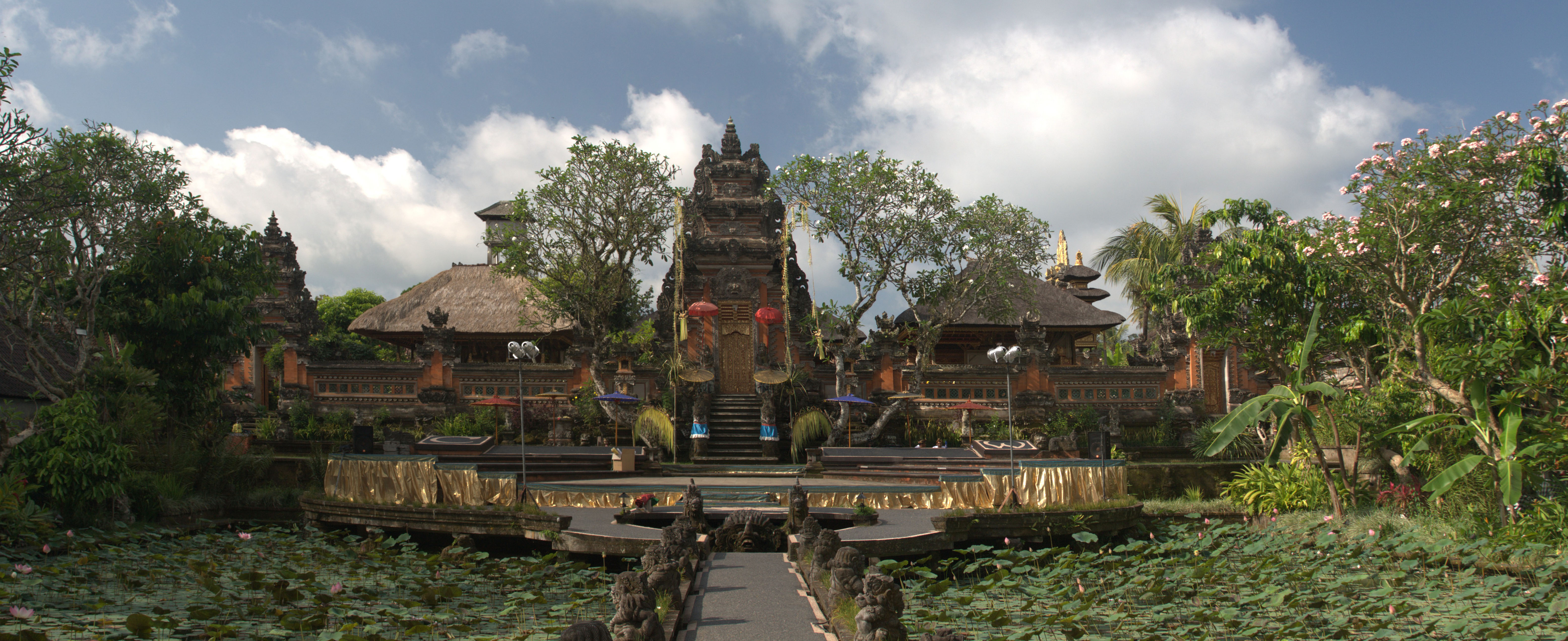
Pura Taman Saraswati, Bali

Watugunung, the last day of the pawukon calendar, is devoted to Saraswati, goddess of learning. Although it is devoted to books, reading is not allowed. The fourth day of the year is called Pagerwesi, meaning "iron fence". It commemorates a battle between good and evil.

Saraswati is an important goddess in Balinese Hinduism. She shares the same attributes and iconography as Saraswati in Hindu literature of India – in both places, she is the goddess of knowledge, creative arts, wisdom, language, learning and purity. In Bali, she is celebrated on Saraswati day, one of the main festivals for Hindus in Indonesia. The day marks the close of 210 day year in the Pawukon calendar.

On Saraswati day, people make offerings in the form of flowers in temples and to sacred texts. The day after Saraswati day, is Banyu Pinaruh, a day of cleansing. On this day, Hindus of Bali go to the sea, sacred waterfalls or river spots, offer prayers to Saraswati, and then rinse themselves in that water in the morning. Then they prepare a feast, such as the traditional bebek betutu and nasi kuning, that they share.

The Saraswati Day festival has a long history in Bali. It has become more widespread in Hindu community of Indonesia in recent decades, and it is celebrated with theatre and dance performance.

==== Southeast Asia ====
Saraswati was honoured with invocations among the Hindus of Angkorian Cambodia. She and Brahma are referred to in Cambodian epigraphy from the 7th century onwards, and she is praised by Khmer poets for being the goddess of eloquence, writing, and music. More offerings were made to her than to her husband Brahma. She is also referred to as Vagisvari and Bharati in the Khmer literature of the era of Yasovarman, Hindu king of the Khmer Empire.

== In Buddhism ==
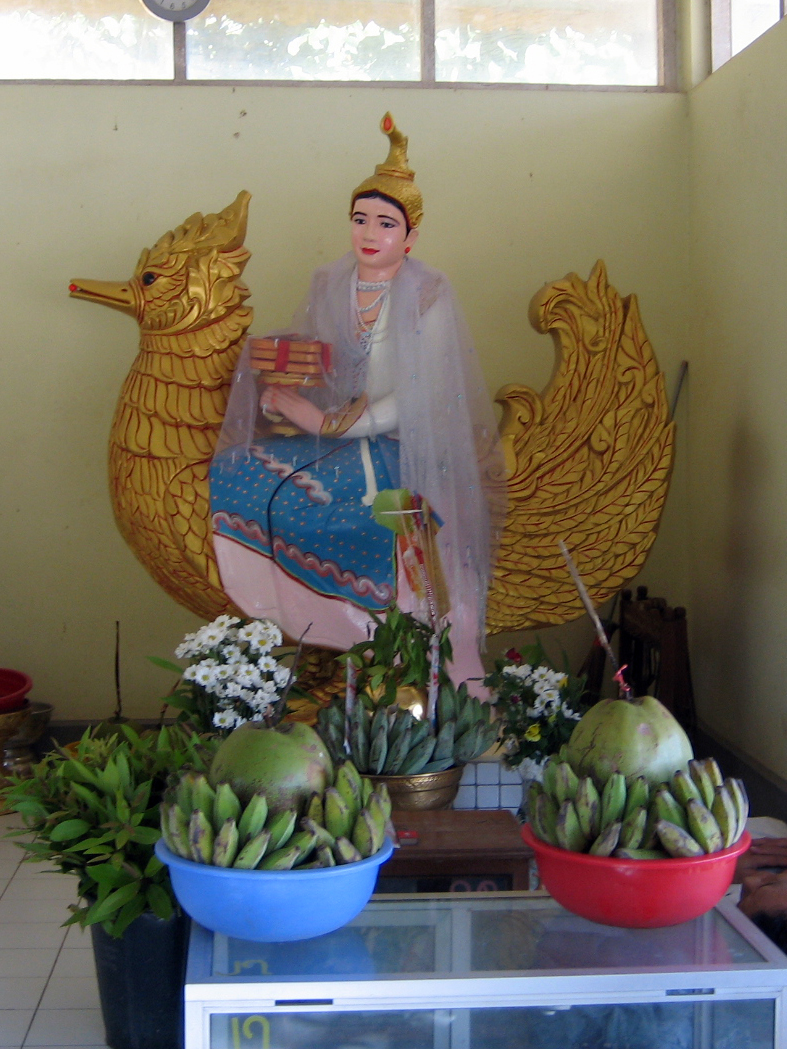
Statue of Thurathadi at Kyauktawgyi Buddha Temple (Yangon)

In Buddhism, Saraswati became a prominent deity which retained many of her Vedic associations, such as speech, texts, knowledge, healing and protection. She also became known as the consort of Manjushri, the bodhisattva of wisdom (prajña). According to Miranda Shaw's Buddhist Goddesses of India:

Saraswati's association with the intellectual sphere assured that she would find favor among Buddhists, who highly value wisdom and its servants: mental clarity, reasoning ability, memorization, and oratorical skill. Saraswati thus has an affinity with Prajñaparamita, the goddess of perfect wisdom. They may be in voked by the same mantra, reflecting the kinship between the wisdom goddess and the patroness of learning.

Shaw lists various epithets for Saraswati used by Buddhist source including: "Emanation of Vishnu," "Gandharva Maiden," "Swan Child," "Daughter of Brahma", "Lady of the Lake", "Sister of the Moon", "Goddess of Speech", "Divine Lady Who Empowers Enlightened Speech", "Goddess Rich with the Power of Adamantine Speech", "Bestower of Understanding", "Goddess of Knowledge", and "Wisdom Goddess." According to Shaw, Buddhist depictions of Saraswati are influenced by Hindu ones. A popular depiction is called "Lady of the Adamantine Lute" (Vajravina) which is described by Shaw as.

a white, two-armed epiphany in which she plays her supernal lute, or vina. The instrument is made of lapis lazuli and has a thousand strings capable of eliciting every musical note. Saraswati's melodies pervade the universe and delight all types of beings in accordance with whatever is most pleasing to their ears. She sits with ankles crossed and knees raised in a distinctive posture suitable for balancing a musical instrument.

Saraswati's earliest appearance in a Buddhist text is in the 1st century CE Mahayana Golden Light Sutra (of which there are different versions / translations). This text is first attested in a Chinese translation in 417 CE and includes an entire chapter devoted to the goddess, which is our best source for the earliest Buddhist depictions of Saraswati.

=== In the Golden Light Sutra ===
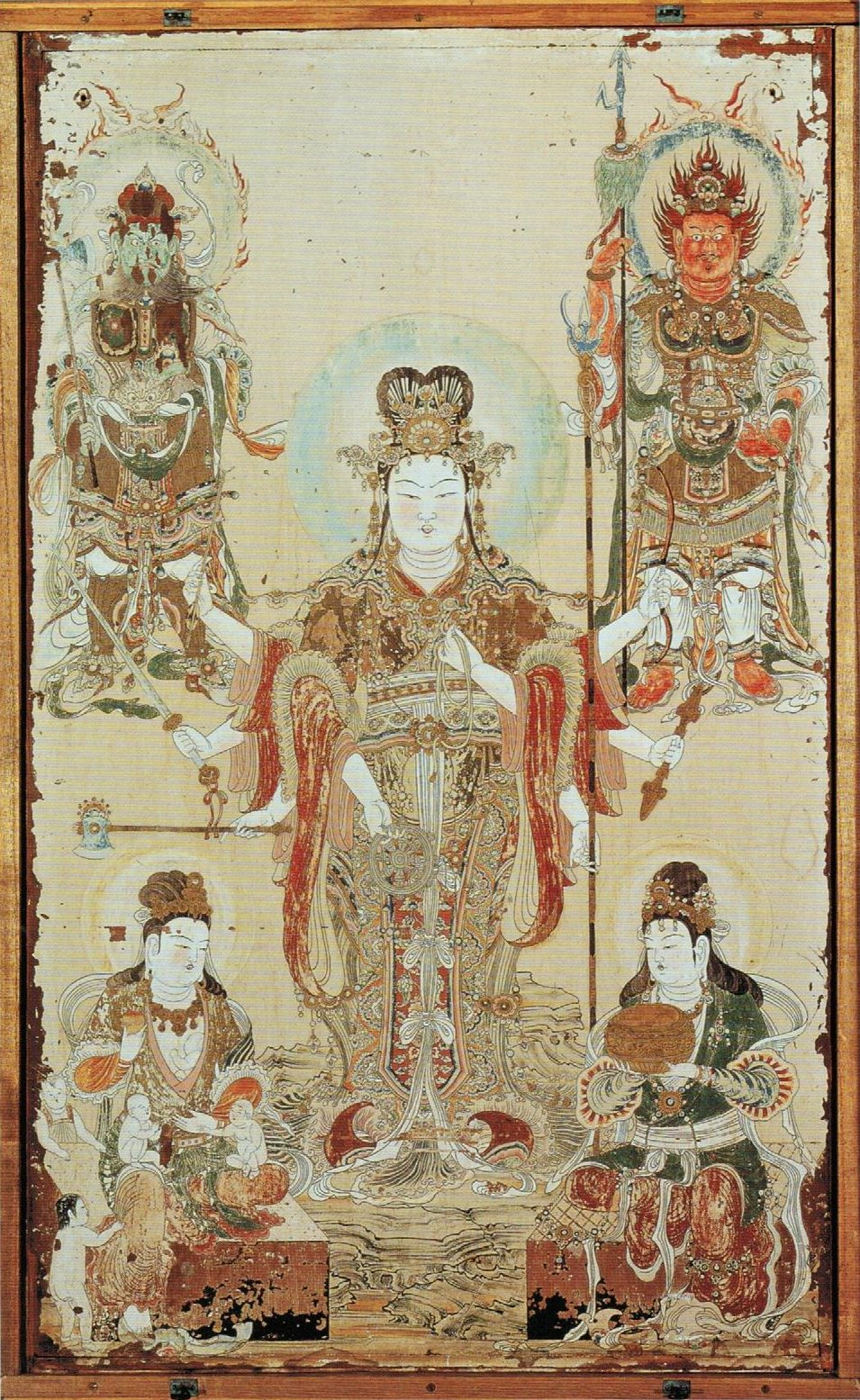
A Japanese depiction of Saraswati as a protector deity with eight arms holding various weapons (c. 1212), University Art Museum, Tokyo University of the Arts

In the Golden Light Sutra (Suvarṇaprabhāsa Sūtra), Saraswati appears and pays homage to the Buddha. As Shaw writes, she then "promises that she will grace the preachers of the scripture with eloquence, oratorical power, perfect memory, inconceivable knowledge, penetrating wisdom, illumination, skill in liberating others, scholarly expertise in every field, proficiency in all the arts, merit, prosperity, and long life."

Saraswati's chapter in the Golden Light Sutra presents three main aspects of the goddess. First, it presents her as a goddess of eloquence and speech, then it presents her as a healing goddess who teaches a ritual which includes a medicinal bath, finally it presents Saraswati as a goddess of protection and war. Ludvik mentions that the earliest version of the Golden Light Sutra (the translation by Dharmaksema) actually only includes the first depiction. The early Chinese Buddhist translators chose to translate her name as "great eloquence deity" (大辯天) the later translations by Yijing use "Eloquence Talent Goddess" (Biancai tiannu), though phonetic translations were also applied (e.g. Yijing's "mohetipi suoluosuobodi").

In the Golden Light Sutra, Saraswati is closely associated with eloquence, as well as with the closely connected virtues of memory and knowledge. Saraswati is also said to help monks memorize the Buddhist sutras and to guide them so they will not make mistakes in memorizing them or forget them later. She will also help those who have incomplete manuscripts to regain the lost letters or words. She also teaches a dharani (a long mantra-like recitation) to improve memory. The Golden Light goes as far as to claim that Saraswati can provide the wisdom to understand all the Buddhist teachings and skillful means (upaya) so that one may swiftly attain Buddhahood.

In some versions of the Golden Light Sutra, such as Yijing's, the goddess then teaches an apotropaic ritual that can combat disease, bad dreams, war, calamities and all sorts of negative things. It includes bathing in a bath with numerous herbs that has been infused with a dharani spell. This passage contains much information on ancient materia medica and herbology. Ludvik adds that this may be connected to her role as healer of Indra in the Yajur Veda and to ancient Indian bathing rites.

In the latter part of the Golden Light's Saraswati chapter, she is praised as a protector goddess by the Brahman Kaundinya. This section also teaches a dharani and a ritual to invoke the goddess and receive her blessings to obtain knowledge. In latter sections of Kaundinya's praise, she is described as an eight armed goddess and compared to a lion. The text also states that is some recites these praises, "one obtains all desires, wealth and grain, and one gains splendid, noble success." The poem describes Saraswati as one who "has sovereignty in the world", and states that she fights in battlefields and is always victorious. The hymn then describes Saraswati's warlike eight-armed form. She carries eight weapons in each hand – a bow, arrow, sword, spear, axe, vajra, iron wheel, and noose.

Kaudinya's hymn to Saraswati in Yijing's translation is derived from the Āryāstava ("praise of she who is noble"), a hymn uttered by Vishnu to the goddess Nidra (lit. "Sleep", one of the names applied to Durga) found in the Harivamsha. As the Golden Light Sutra is often concerned with the protection of the state, it is not surprising that the fierce, weapon-wielding Durga, who was widely worshiped by rulers and warriors alike for success in battle, provides the model for the appearance assumed by Saraswati, characterized as a protectress of the Buddhist Dharma. Bernard Faure argues that the emergence of a martial Saraswatī may have been influenced by the fact that "Vāc, the Vedic goddess of speech, had already displayed martial characteristics. [...] Already in the Vedas, it is said that she destroys the enemies of the gods, the asuras. Admittedly, later sources seem to omit or downplay that aspect of her powers, but this does not mean that its importance in religious practice was lost."

=== Other Indian Mahayana sources ===
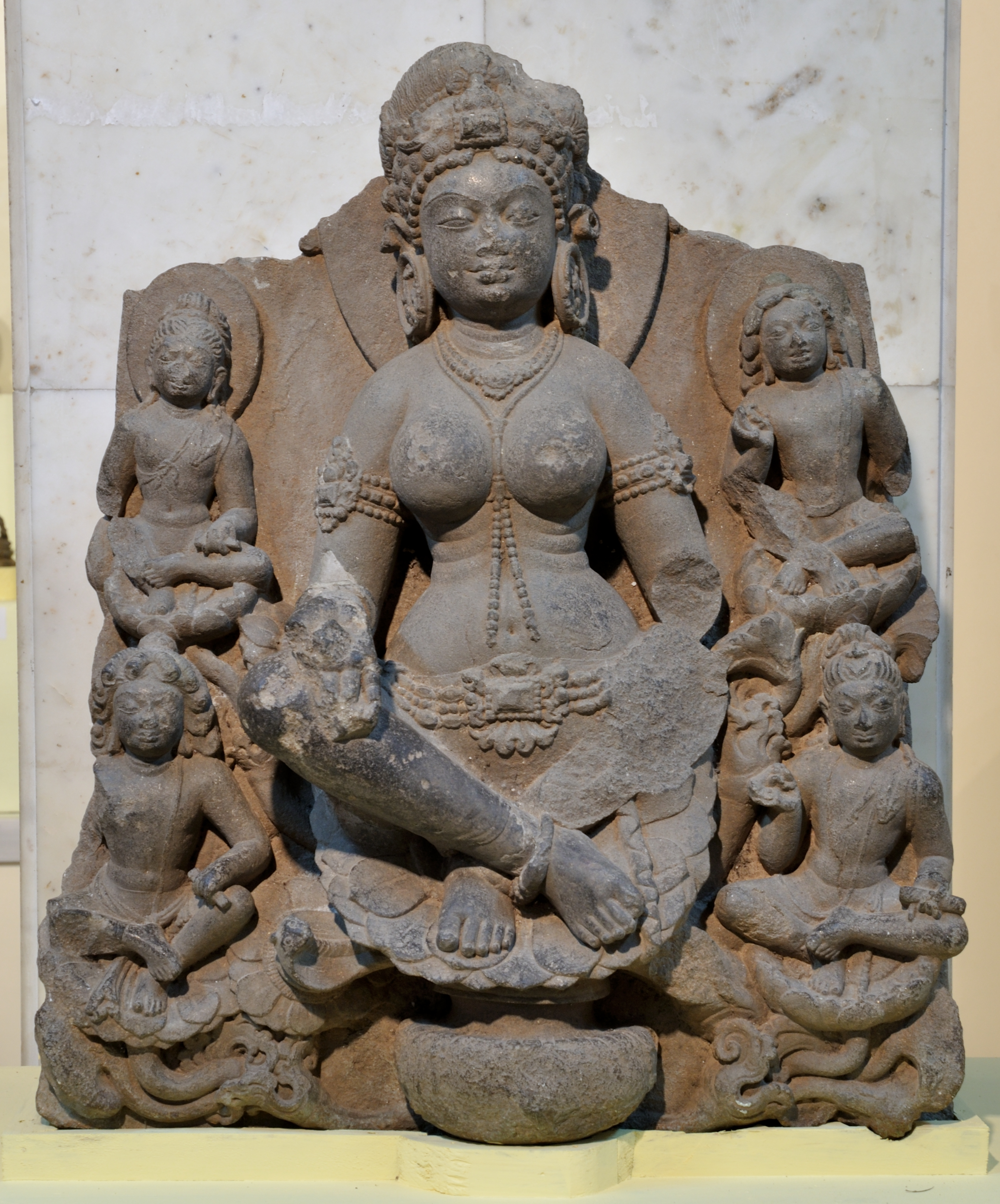
A statue of Vajraśāradā, a classic Buddhist form of Saraswati, Pala Period (8th century CE), Indian Museum, Kolkata

In some later Mahayana Buddhist sources like the Sādhanamālā (a 5th-century collection of ritual texts), Saraswati is symbolically represented in a way which is similar to Hindu iconography. The description of the deity (here called Mahāsaraswatī) is as follows:

The worshipper should think himself as goddess Mahāsaraswatī, who is resplendent like the autumn moon, rests on the moon over the white lotus, shows the varada-mudrā in her right hand, and carries in the left the white lotus with its stem. She has a smiling countenance, is extremely compassionate, wears garments decorated with white sandal-flowers. Her bosom is decorated with the pearl-necklace, and she is decked in many ornaments; she appears a maiden of twelve years, and her bosom is uneven with half-developed breasts like flower-buds; she illumines the three worlds with the immeasurable light that radiates from her body.

In the Sādhanamālā, the mantra of Saraswati is: oṃ hrīḥ mahāmāyāṅge mahāsarasvatyai namaḥ

The Sādhanamālā also depicts other forms of Saraswati, including Vajravīṇā Saraswatī (similar to Mahāsaraswatī except she carries a veena), Vajraśāradā Saraswatī (who has three eyes, sits on a white lotus, her head is decorated by a crescent and holds a book and a lotus), Vajrasaraswatī (has six hands and three heads with brown hair rising upwards), and Āryasaraswatī (sixteen-year-old girl carrying the Prajñapramita sutra and a lotus).

According to the Kāraṇḍavyūha Sūtra (c. 4th century – 5th century CE), Saraswati was born from the eyetooth of Avalokiteshvara.

Saraswati is also briefly mentioned in the esoteric Vairochanabhisambodhi Sutra as one of the divinities of the western quarter of the Outer Vajra section of the Womb Realm Mandala along with Prithvi, Vishnu (Narayana), Skanda (Kumara), Vayu, Chandra, and their retinue. The text later also describes the veena as Saraswati's symbol. The Chinese translation of this sutra renders her name variously as 辯才 (Ch. Biàncái; Jp. Benzai, lit. "eloquence"), 美音天 (Ch. Měiyīntiān; Jp. Bionten, "goddess of beautiful sounds"), and 妙音天 (Ch. Miàoyīntiān; Jp. Myōonten, "goddess of wonderful sounds"). Here, Saraswati is portrayed with two arms holding a veena and situated between Narayana's consort Narayani and Skanda (shown riding on a peacock).

Saraswati was initially depicted as a single goddess without consort. Her association with the bodhisattva of wisdom Manjusri is drawn from later tantric sources such as the Kṛṣṇayamāri tantra, where she is depicted as red skinned (known as "Red Saraswati").

In various Indian tantric sadhanas to Saraswati (which only survive in Tibetan translation), her bija (seed) mantra is Hrīḥ.

=== Nepalese Buddhism ===
Saraswati is worshiped in Nepalese Buddhism, where she is a popular deity, especially for students. She is celebrated in an annual festival called Vasant Pañcami and children first learn the alphabet during a Saraswati ritual. In Nepalese Buddhism, her worship is often combined with that of Manjusri and many sites for the worship of Manjusri are also used to worship Saraswati, including Svayambhu Hill.

=== In East Asian Buddhism ===
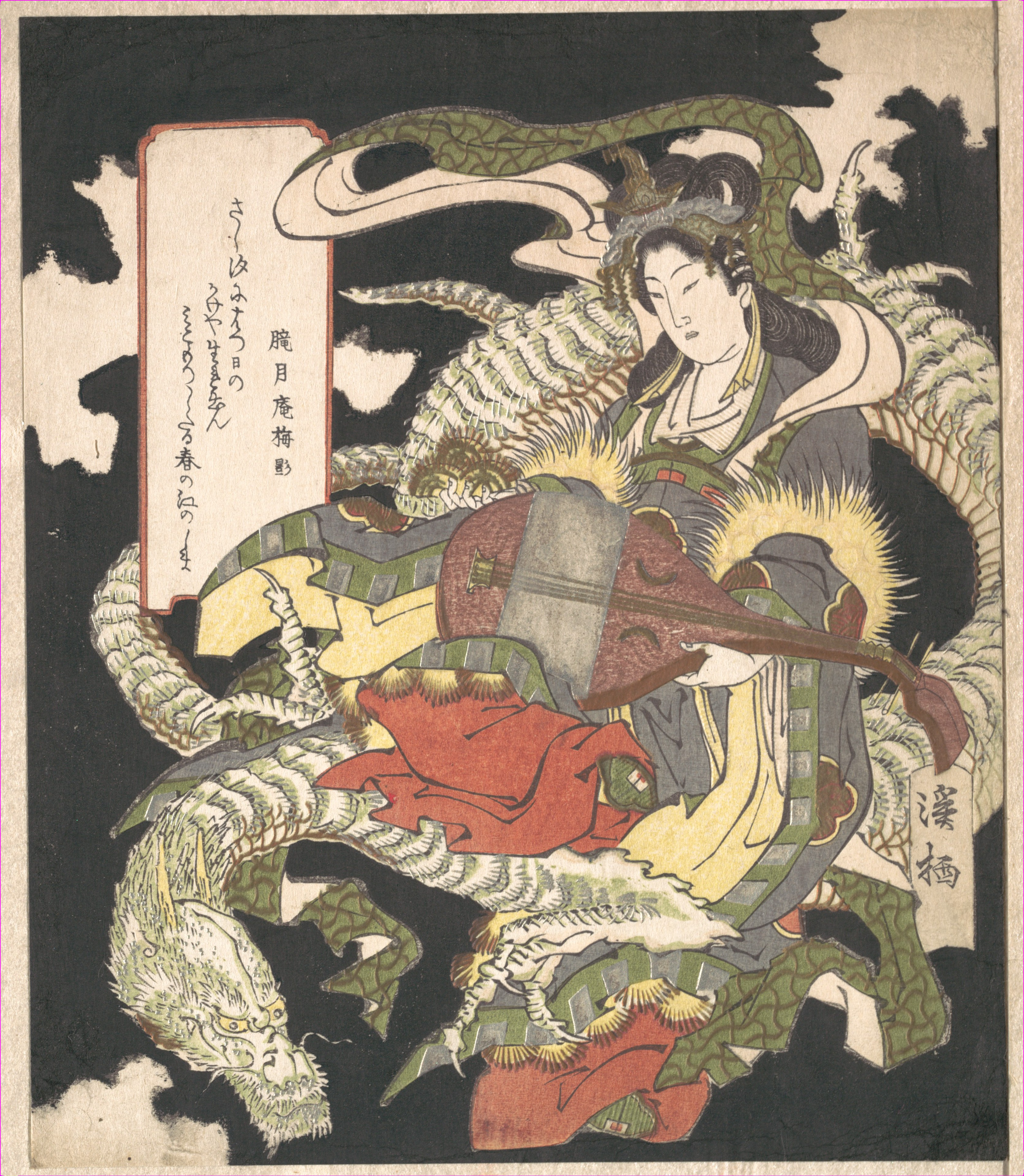
Japanese illustration of Benzaiten (Saraswati) riding a dragon

Veneration of Saraswati migrated from the Indian subcontinent to China with the spread of Buddhism, where she in known as Biàncáitiān (辯才天), meaning "Eloquent Devī", as well as Miàoyīntiān (妙音天), meaning "Devī of Wonderful Sounds".

She is commonly enshrined in Chinese Buddhist monasteries as one of the Twenty-Four Devas, a group of protective deities who are regarded as protectors of the Buddhist dharma. Her Chinese iconography is based on her description in the Golden Light Sutra, where she is portrayed as having eight arms, one holding a bow, one holding arrows, one holding a knife, one holding a lance, one holding an axe, one holding a pestle, one holding an iron wheel, and one holding ropes. In another popular Buddhist iconographic form, she is portrayed as sitting down and playing a pipa, a Chinese lute-like instrument. The concept of Saraswati migrated from India, through China to Japan, where she appears as Benzaiten (弁財天, lit. "goddess of eloquence"). Worship of Benzaiten arrived in Japan during the 6th through 8th centuries. She is often depicted holding a biwa, a traditional Japanese lute musical instrument. She is enshrined on numerous locations throughout Japan such as the Kamakura's Zeniarai Benzaiten Ugafuku Shrine or Nagoya's Kawahara Shrine; the three biggest shrines in Japan in her honour are at the Enoshima Island in Sagami Bay, the Chikubu Island in Lake Biwa, and the Itsukushima Island in Seto Inland Sea.

In Japanese esoteric Buddhism (mikkyo), the main mantra for this deity is:

Oṃ Sarasvatyai svāhā (Sino-Japanese: On Sarasabatei-ei Sowaka).

=== In Indo-Tibetan Buddhism ===
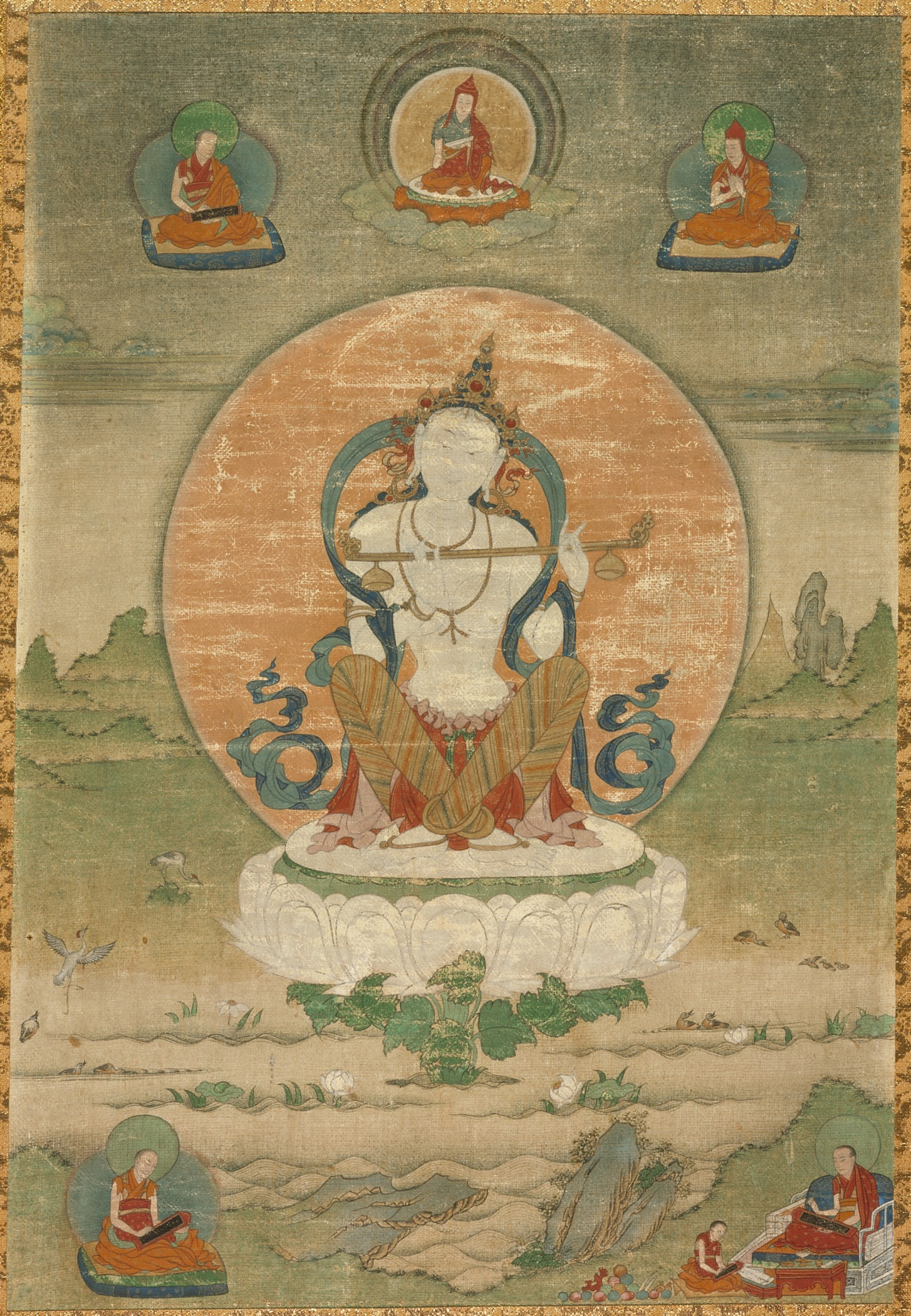
Saraswati in an 18th-century CE Tibetan artwork, holding a stick zither

In the Indo-Tibetan Buddhism of the Himalayan regions, Saraswati is known as Yangchenma (Tibetan: དབྱངས་ཅན་མ, Wylie: dbyangs can ma, THL: yang chen ma), which means '"Goddess of Melodious Voice". She is also called the Tara of Music (Tibetan: དབྱངས་ཅན་སྒྲོལ་མ, Wylie: dbyangs can sgrol ma, THL: yang chen dröl ma) as one of the 21 Taras. She is also considered the consort of Manjushri, bodhisattva of Wisdom. Saraswati is the divine embodiment & bestower of enlightened eloquence & inspiration. For all those engaged in creative endeavours in Tibetan Buddhism she is a patroness of the arts, sciences, music, language, literature, history, poetry & philosophy.

Saraswati also became associated with the Tibetan deity Palden Lhamo (Glorious Goddess) who is a fierce protector deity in the Gelugpa tradition known as Magzor Gyalmo (the Queen who Repels Armies). Saraswati was the yidam (principal personal meditational deity) of 14th century Tibetan monk Je Tsongkhapa, who composed a devotional poem to her.

Tibetan Buddhism teaches numerous mantras of Saraswati. Her seed syllable is often Hrīṃ. In a sadhana (ritual text) revealed by the great Tibetan female lama Sera Khandro, her mantra is presented as:

Oṃ hrīṃ devi prajñā vārdhani ye svāhā

=== In South East Asian Buddhism ===
In Burmese Buddhism, Saraswati is worshipped as Thurathadi (Burmese: သူရဿတီ), an important nat (Burmese deity) and is a guardian of the Buddhist scriptures (Tipitaka), scholars, students and writers. Students in Myanmar often pray for her blessings before their exams. She is an important deity to the esoteric weizzas (Buddhist wizards) of Burma.

In ancient Thai literature, Saraswati (Thai: สุรัสวดี; RTGS: Suratsawadi) is the goddess of speech and learning, and consort of Brahma. Over time, Hindu and Buddhist concepts merged in Thailand. Icons of Saraswati with other deities of India are found in old Thai wats. Amulets with Saraswati and a peacock are also found in Thailand.

== In Jainism ==
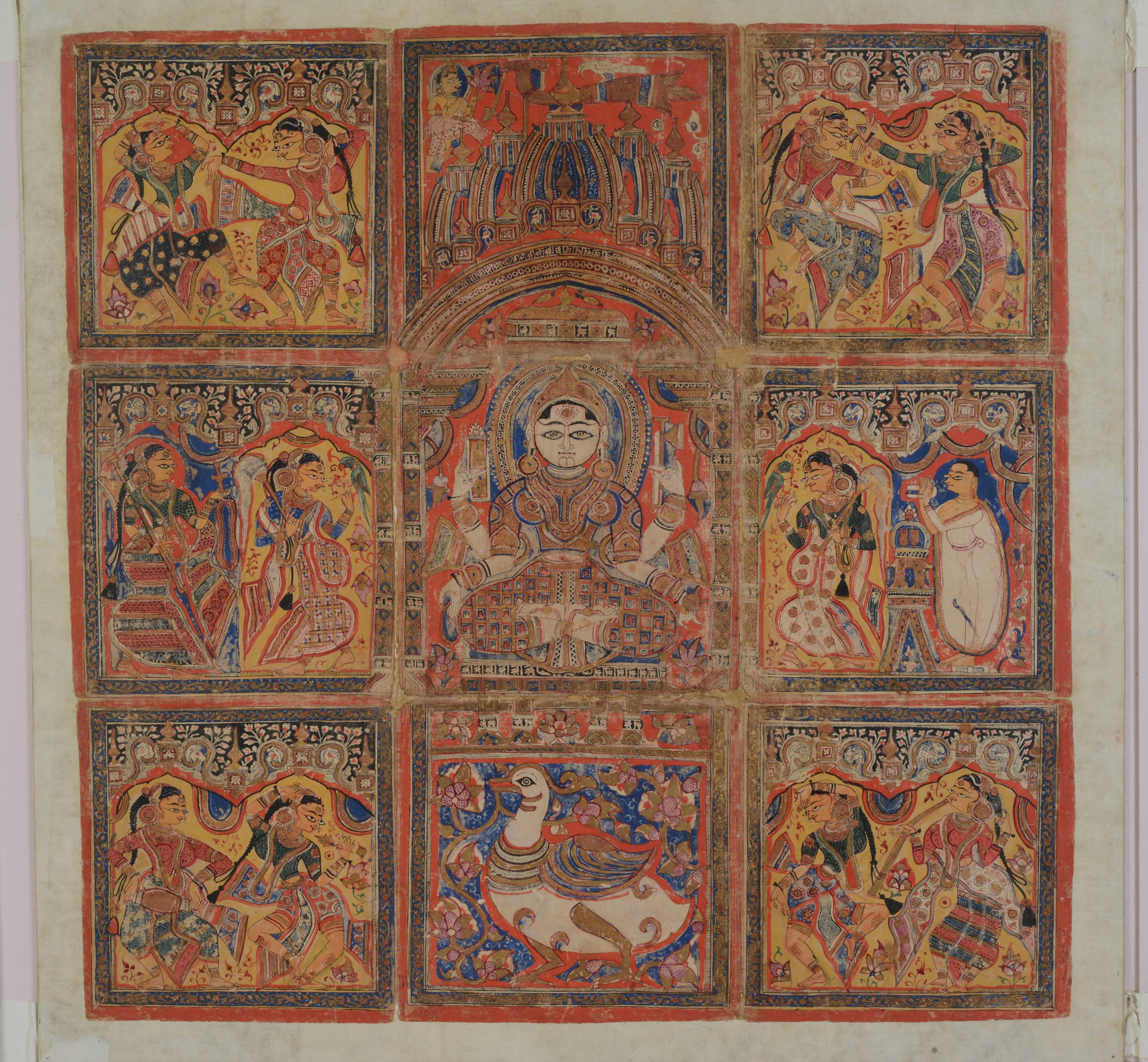
Saraswati Pata. The painting is divided into nine parts. In three central panels a temple enshrining Saraswati and her vahana, Hamsa, are depicted. Other panels are filled with attendants, musicians, dancers and Jain monks. Jain style, Gujarat, 1475–1500. National Museum, New Delhi.

Saraswati is also revered in Jainism as the goddess of knowledge and is regarded as the source of all learning. She is known as Srutadevata, Sarada, and Vagisvari. Saraswati is depicted in a standing posture with four arms, one holding a text, another holding a rosary and the remaining two holding the Veena. Saraswati is seated on a lotus with the peacock as her vehicle. Saraswati is also regarded as responsible for dissemination of tirthankars sermon. The earliest sculpture of Saraswati in any religious tradition is the Mathura Jain Saraswati from Kankali Tila dating from 132 CE.

== Cross Civilisation Reference ==
Saraswati is worshipped in Hindu Sanatan (Vedic) tradition. Similar divine figures and beliefs can also found in many ancient civilisations around the world. In Hindu tradition, Goddess Saraswati is known for any foam of art, Music, literature, education, knowledge, wisdom research, writing, speech, in weather spring season, water of river, her musical instrument veena, her favourite colour white, animal and bird is peacock, swan. similar themes and associations can be observed in different cultures and civilisations across the world. Some of these similarity are presented in the chart below.

Region and Goddess	Attributes and Objects	Animal and associated creature	Sacred days and rituals	Cultural and philosophical associations
Saraswati; India Hindustan	Veena (Musical Instruments), book, rosary, and water pot.	Swan (Hansa) and peacock	Vasant Panchami is celebrated in her honour. Books, Musical Instruments and learning materials are traditionally placed before the goddess during worship.	Associated with Saraswati River, knowledge, Speech, music, literature, learning and arts. Her connection with Vedic speech is also linked to the goddess. Vāc.
Benzaiten; Japan (Biddhism and Shinto).	Biwa (Japanese lute), with other attributes varying across different representations.	Snake and dragon, associated with water and Buddhist nāga traditions.	Worship takes place at temples and shrines, Including those near lakes and other bodies of water. Some traditions associate her with the day of the snake.	Her historical origins are connected with the Indian goddess Saraswati through the spread of Buddhism. In Japan, she became associated with music, eloquence, learning and water.
Anahita; Ancient Persia (Zoroastrianism)	Often described wearing rich clothing and jewellery, Her traditional representations includes a decorated crown and a chariot.	Four white horses, associated in the Avesta with wind, rain, clouds, and sleet.	Honoured in the Aban Yasht (Yasht 5), a hymn dedicated to the waters. Water and rivers have an importent place in her worship.	Associated with waters, fertility and the protection of life. The Iranian name Harahvaiti and the Vedic name Saraswati have a shared Indo-Iranian linguistic background. Scholars have discussed the historical relationship between the two traditions.
Athena / Minerva; Greece and Rome	Spear,shield,helmet,aegis and olive branch. Also associated with weaving and crafts	Owl and serpent	The Roman festivalQuinquatria was held in honour of Minerva. It was associated with craftsmen, artists and professional activities.	Goddness of wisdom, strategic warfare, crafts and learnig. Her associations with wisdom artistic skills provide a point of comparison with Saraswati, although no direct historical connection between the two has been established
Seshat; Ancient Egypt	Palm stem used for recording, writing and measuring, and a measuring cord.	Associated with a seven pointed star symbol worn above her head.	Participated in the Egyptian temple fondation ceremony known as the stretching of the cord.	Goddness of writing, mathematics, measurement and record keeping. She was closely associated with the god Thoth. Her role in preserving records and knowledge provides a subject for comparison with Saraswati.
Biàncáitiān (辯才天); China (Buddhism)	Representations and attributes vary in Chinese Buddhist traditions. The goddess is associated with eloquence and religious teaching.	No Single animal attribute is common to all representations.	Worship and religious practices are connected with BUddhist temples and recitation of sacred texts.	The Chinese name means the goddess of eloquence. It developed through the translation of Buddhist texts concerning Saraswati. The Chinese Buddhist traditions preserved her associations with speech, memory and knowledge.
Ọ̀ṣun (Oshun) and Yemọja (Yemaya); West Africa (Yoruba religion)	Oshun is associated with mirrors, Fan, Brass, Jewellers, and honey, Yemaya is with the sea and motherhood. Their attributes differ.	Oshun is associated with fish peacocks, in some traditions. Yemaya is associated with marine life.	The annual Osun-Osogbo take place in Nigeria. Worship of Oshun is closely connected with the Oshun River and its sacred grove.	Oshun is associated with rivers, fertility, healing, beauty and motherhood, Temaya is associated with the ocen, motherhood and protection. Both have Important roles in Ypruba religious traditions.
Ix Chel; Maya civilisation (Mesoamerica)	Associated in Maya art and religious traditions with weaving, childbirth, medicine and water. Some representations show her with a water vessel.	Serpent and jaguar features appear in some representations.	Her worship was associated with religious pilgrimage and healing. Her cult was important as sites in the yucatán region.	A complex Maya goddess associated with the moon, medicine, weaving, childbirth, water and fertility. Her different role have been discussed in archaeological and historical studies.

== See also ==
- Aban, "the Waters", representing and represented by Aredvi Sura Anahita.
- Anahita – the Old Persian goddess of wisdom
- Arachosia name of which derives from Old Iranian *Harahvatī (Avestan Haraxˇaitī, Old Persian Hara(h)uvati-).
- Athena – the Greek goddess of wisdom and knowledge
- Koothanur Maha Saraswathi Temple
- Minerva – the Roman goddess of wisdom and knowledge
- Rhea – the Greek goddess consort of Cronos and mother of the gods and titans.
- Sága – the Norse goddess of learning and knowledge
- Saraswati Vandana Mantra
