= Saraswathi Kshetramu, Ananthasagar =

Sri Saraswathi Kshetramu, Anantha Sagar
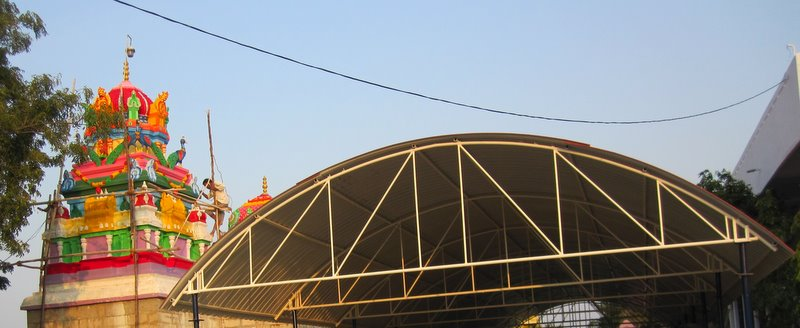

- Location in Telangana

Religion
- Affiliation: Hinduism
- District: siddipet district
- Deity: Saraswathi

Location
- Location: Ananthasagar, Siddipet Division
- State: Telangana
- Country: India
- Coordinates: 18°12′21″N 78°59′17″E

Architecture
- Completed: 2 May 1980 built by Sri Astakala Narasimha Rama Sharma (Astavadhani)

Website
- www.saraswathikshetram.org

Saraswathi Kshetramu is a Hindu Temple of Goddess Saraswathi located in the Ananthasagar, Chinna Kodur Mandal, Siddipet Division, Siddipet district of Telangana. The temple was built on Friday, 2 May 1980 (Roudri Year, Vaishakha month) by Astakala Narasimha Rama Sharma (Astavadhani). It is located between Siddipet to Karimnagar, 22 km away from the former, 125 km from Hyderabad and 63 km from Medak.

== History ==
This temple was built by Astakala Narasimha Rama Sharma, a teacher by profession, who, determined not to rely on donations for its construction, used his money from his salary as an astrologer, Vaastu shastra expert, and groundwater locator. In India Saraswathi temples are rare. The first Saraswathi temple in India was Vaishnavi Temple in Jammu & Kashmir. The second temple is located in Basar. This temple is considered as the third Saraswathi temple and is located in the Shivaru mountains, which come under Ananthasagar village. This is the first temple having standing pose of Saraswathi.

=== Festivals ===
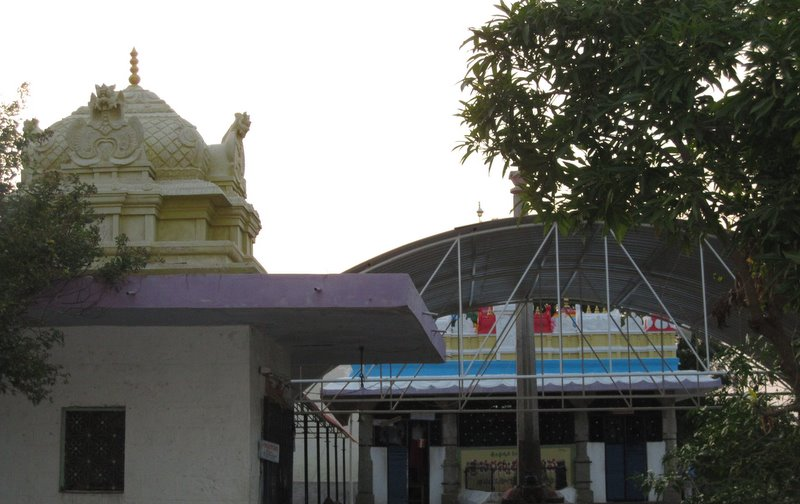
Temple front view

Saraswati Puja is performed on the fifth day of Magha month of the Vedic Calendar (also known as Basant Panchami).

As in several parts of India, and especially the South, Saraswati pujas are conducted during Navaratri – a nine day long festival celebrating the power of the feminine aspect of divinity or shakti. The last three days of Navaratri starting from Mahalaya Amavasya (the New Moon day) are dedicated to the goddess.

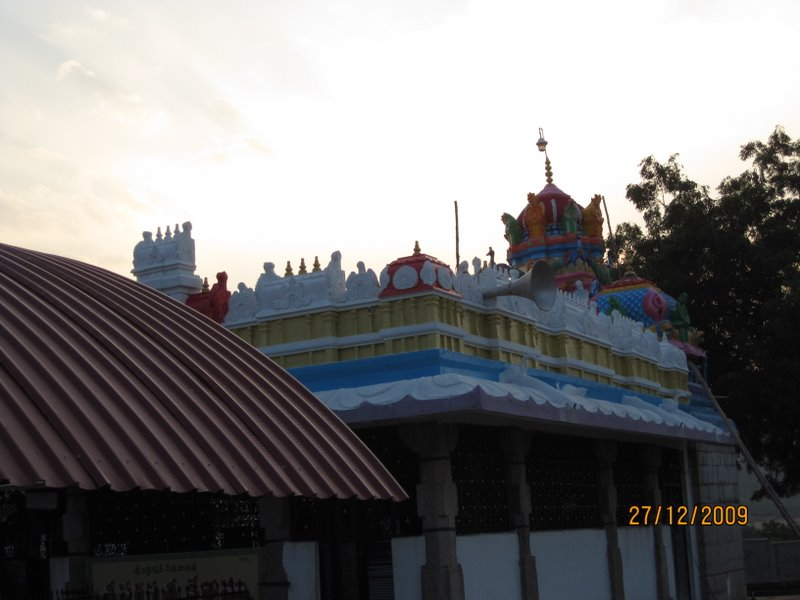
Temple side view

On the ninth day of Navaratri (Mahanavami), especially Sharad Navaratri, books and musical instruments are ceremoniously placed before the image of Saraswathi early at dawn and she is worshipped with special prayers. No studies or any performance of arts is carried out, as it is considered that the Goddess herself is blessing the books and the instruments. The festival is concluded on the tenth day of Navaratri (Vijaya Dashami) and the goddess is worshipped again before the books and the musical instruments are removed. It is customary to study on this day, which is called Vidyarambham (literally, Commencement of Knowledge): students are traditionally required to revise much of what they have learnt up to that day, and also to start the study of something new. Gurus (preceptors) are worshipped on this day as embodiments of Saraswathi.

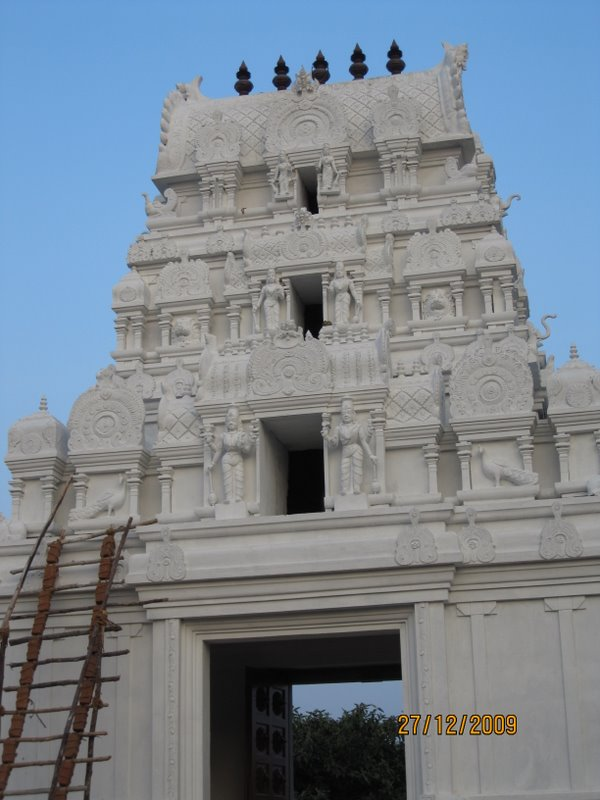
Temple SimhaDvaram

== Related temples ==
Although Saraswati temples are rare, major temples for the goddess are present as,

- Sarala temple of Jhankad in Cuttack district of Orissa,
- Saraswathi temple in Basar town in the Adilabad district of Telangana,
- Wargal Saraswati Temple, Medak Dist.
- Shringeri in Chikmagalur district of Karnataka,
- Pushkar in Ajmer district of Rajasthan,
- Panachikkad in Kottayam district in the state of Kerala,
- Thiruvarur in Tiruvarur district in the state of Tamil Nadu,
- Saraswathi Amman, located opposite to the famous Shiva temple of Nellaiappar Temple, Tirunelveli in Tirunelveli districtof Tamil Nadu,
- Sharada Peeth in Jammu and Kashmir and
- Bhadrakali, Gairidhara and Handigaon in Nepal also have Saraswati temples of historical and/or popular significance.

== See also ==
- Siddipet
