= Jagadevpur =

Jagadevpur (from Jagad =world + deva = god + puri=city, meaning city of the lord of the world) can refer to:

- Jagadevpur, Medak district, a village in Telangana, India
- Jagadevpur, Pakistan, a place in Punjab, Pakistan

== See also ==
- Jagdeo (disambiguation)
