= Nakashi art =

Nakashi art is an art form that is practised in Cherial of Siddipet district & Nirmal & Jagtial District in the state of Telangana, India. They are basically scrolls of narratives from mythology and folklore. They are used in storytelling.

== History ==
The art is believed to be brought to India by Mughal Emperors who brought Usta artists.

== Art form ==
Nakashi art usually contain bright hues (most primary colors) with a predominance of red in the background. They are easy to relate to - as the themes and stories are familiar - drawn from the storehouse of ancient literary and folk traditions.

Nakashi scrolls and dolls were originally used for story telling. These days, they are being used to adorn the walls in homes.

Cherial scroll paintings are highly stylised version on this art.
