= Kotha Dhommata =

Village in Siddipet, Telangana

Kotha Dhommata is a village panchayat in Cherial mandal in Siddipet district in the state of Telangana in India.
