= Chitra (art) =

Historic genre of Indian art

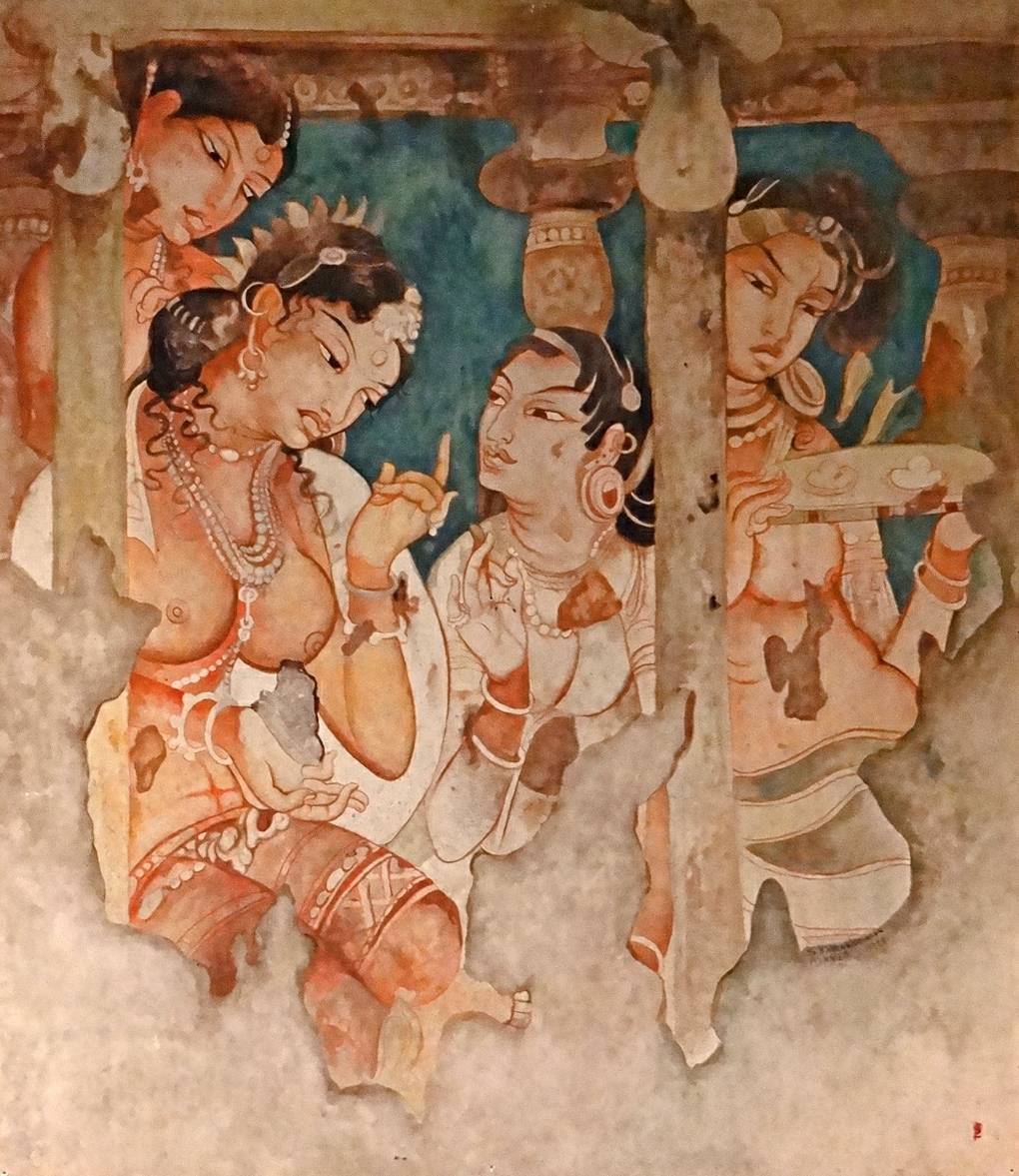
A reproduced portion of 5th-century chitra from Ajanta fresco, at Musee Guimet, Paris

Chitra or citra is an Indian genre of art that includes painting, sketch and any art form of delineation. The earliest mention of the term Chitra in the context of painting or picture is found in some of the ancient Sanskrit texts of Hinduism and Pali texts of Buddhism.

== Nomenclature ==
Chitra (IAST: Citra, चित्र) is a Sanskrit word that appears in the Vedic texts such as hymns 1.71.1 (Note: उप प्र जिन्वन्नुशतीरुशन्तं पतिं न नित्यं जनयः सनीळाः । स्वसारः श्यावीमरुषीमजुष्रञ्चित्रमुच्छन्तीमुषसं न गावः ॥१॥ – Rigveda 1.71.1) and 6.65.2 of the Rigveda. There, and other texts such as Vajasaneyi Samhita, Taittiriya Samhita, Satapatha Brahmana and Tandya Brahmana, Chitra means "excellent, clear, bright, colored, anything brightly colored that strikes the eye, brilliantly ornamented, extraordinary that evokes wonder". In the Mahabharata and the Harivamsa, it means "picture, sketch, dilineation", and is presented as a genre of kala (arts). Many texts generally dated to the post-4th-century BCE period, use the term Chitra in the sense of painting, and Chitrakara as a painter. For example, the Sanskrit grammarian Panini in verse 3.2.21 of his Astadhyayi highlights the word chitrakara in this sense. Halls and public spaces to display paintings are called chitrasalas, and the earliest known mention of these are found in the Ramayana and the Mahabharata.

A few Indian regional texts such as Kasyapa silpa refer to painting by others words. For example, abhasa – which literally means "semblance, shining forth", is used in Kasyapa-shilpa to mean as a broader category of painting, of which chitra is one of three types. The verses in section 4.4 of the Kasyapa-silpa state that there are three types of images – those which are immovable (walls, floor, terracota, stucco), movable, and those which are both movable-immovable (stone, wood, gems). In each of these three, states Kasyapa-shipa, are three classes of expression – ardhacitra, citra, and citra-abhasa. Ardhacitra is an art form where a high relief is combined with painting and parts of the body is not seen (it appears to be emerging out of the canvas). The Citra is the form of picture artwork where the whole is represented with or without integrating a relief. Citrabhasha is the form where an image is represented on a canvas or wall with colors (painting). However, states Commaraswamy, the word Abhasa has other meanings depending on the context. For example, in Hindu texts on philosophy, it implies the "field of objective experience" in the sense of the intellectual image internalized by a person during a reading of a subject (such as an epic, tale or fiction), or one during a meditative spiritual experience.

In some Buddhist and Hindu texts on methods to prepare a manuscript (palm leaf) or a composition on a cloth, the terms lekhya and alekhya are also used in the context of a chitra. More specifically, alekhya is the space left while writing a manuscript leaf or cloth, where the artist aims to add a picture or painting to illustrate the text.

== History ==
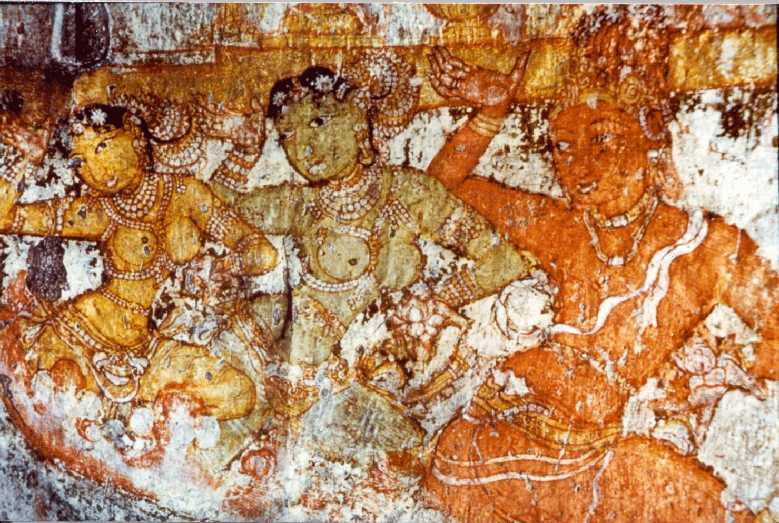
A Chola era mural at a Hindu temple.

The earliest explicit reference to painting in an Indian text is found in verse 4.2 (Note: .... इव क्षणवेषं चित्रभित्तिरिव मिथ्यामनोरममित्यथोक्तम् ॥ शब्दस्पर्शादयो ... – Maitri Upanishad 4.2) of the Maitri Upanishad where it uses the phrase citrabhittir or "like a painted wall". (Note: There are many Hindu texts generally dated to last centuries of the 1st millennium BCE that mention chitra. For example, according to Coomaraswamy – the Ceylonese British scholar of historic art, the Paraskara Grhya Sutra of Hinduism uses a simile with the phrase "as a picture is gradually opened out by means of many colors, so should ...". The Jain inscription at Hathigumpha of Kharavela, dated around the 1st century BCE, in line 13 has a phrase that means "fine towers painted within", but this phrase has also been interpreted as "fine towers carved within".) The Indian art of painting is also mention in a number of Buddhist Pali suttas, but with the modified spelling of Citta. This term is found in the context of either a painting, or painter, or painted-hall (citta-gara) in Majjhima Nikaya 1.127, Samyutta Nikaya 2.101 and 3.152, Vinaya 4.289 and others. Among the Jain texts, it is mentioned in Book 2 of the Acaranga Sutra as it explains that Jaina monk should not indulge in the pleasures of watching a painting.

The Kamasutra, broadly accepted to have been complete by about the 4th-century CE, recommends that the young man should surprise the girl he courts with gifts of color boxes and painted scrolls. The Viddhasalabhanjika – another Hindu kama- and kavya–text uses chitra-simile in verse 1.16, as "pictures painted by the god of love, with the brush of the mind and the canvas of the heart".

The nature of a chitra (painting), how the viewer's mind projects a two dimensional artwork into a three dimensional representation, is used by Asanga in Mahayana Sutralamkara – a 3rd to 5th-century Sanskrit text of the Mahayana Buddhist tradition, to explain "non-existent imagination" as follows:

Just as in a picture painted according to rules, there are neither projections nor depressions and yet we see it in three dimensions, so in the non-existent imagination there is no phenomenal differentiation, and yet we behold it.

— Mahayana Sutralamkara 13.7, Translated in French by Sylvain Levi

According to Yoko Taniguchi and Michiyo Mori, the art of painting the caves at the c. 6th-century Buddhas of Bamiyan site in Afghanistan, destroyed by the Taliban Muslims in the late 1990s, were likely introduced to this region from India along with the literature on early Buddhism. (Note: The painting motifs, style and technique found in the Bamiyan site is syncretic, as some designs are likely Sassanian.)

=== Texts ===
There are many important dedicated Indian treatises on chitra. Some of these are chapters within a larger encyclopedia-like text. These include:

- Chitrasutras, chapters 35–43 within the Hindu text Vishnudharmottara Purana (the standard, and oft referred to text in the Indian tradition)
- Chitralaksana of Nagnajit (a classic on classical painting, 5th-century CE or earlier making it the oldest known text on Indian painting; but the Sanskrit version has been lost, only version available is in Tibet and it states that it is a translation of a Sanskrit text)
- Samarangana Sutradhara (mostly architecture treatise, contains a large section on paintings)
- Aparajitaprccha (mostly architecture treatise, contains a large section on paintings)
- Manasollasa (an encyclopedia, contains chapters on paintings)
- Abhilashitartha chinatamani
- Sivatatva ratnakara
- Chitra Kaladruma
- Silpa ratna
- Narada silpa
- Sarasvati silpa
- Prajapati silpa
- Kasyapa silpa

These and other texts on chitra not only discuss the theory and practice of painting, some of them include discussions on how to become a painter, the diversity and the impact of a chitra on viewers, of aesthetics, how the art of painting relates to other arts (kala), methods of preparing the canvas or wall, methods and recipes to make color pigments. For example, the 10th-century Chitra Kaladruma presents recipe for making red color paint from the resin of lac insects. Other colors for the historic frescoes found in India, such as those in the Ajanta Caves, were obtained from nature. Inorganic (earthy) colorants like yellow and red ochre, orpiment, green celadonite, and ultramarine blue are mentioned (lapis lazuli). Inorganic (earthy) colorants like yellow and red ochre, orpigment, green celadonite, and ultramarine blue are mentioned (lapis lazuli).

The use of organic colorants prepared per a recipe in these texts have been confirmed through residue analysis and modern chromatographic techniques.

== Theory ==
The Indian concepts of painting are described in a range of texts called the shilpa shastras. These typically begin by attributing this art to divine sources such as Vishvakarma and ancient rishis (sages) such as Narayana and Nagnajit, weaving some mythology, highlighting chitra as a means to express ideas and beauty along with other universal aspects, then proceed to discuss the theory and practice of painting, sketching and other related arts. Manuscripts of many these texts are found in India, while some are known to be lost but are found outside India such as in Tibet and Nepal. Among these are the Citrasutras in the 6th-century Visnudharmottara Purana manuscripts discovered in India, and the Citralaksana manuscript discovered in Tibet (lost in India). This theory include early Indian ideas on how to prepare a canvas or substrate, measurement, proportion, stance, color, shade, projection, the painting's interaction with light, the viewer, how to captivate the mind, and other ideas.

According to the historic Indian tradition, a successful and impactful painting and painter requires a knowledge of the subject – either mythology or real life, as well as a keen sense of observation and knowledge of nature, human behavior, dance, music, song and other arts. For example, section 3.2 of Visnudharmottara Purana discusses these requirements and the contextual knowledge needed in chitra and the artist who produces it. The Chitrasutras in the Vishnudharmottara Purana state that the sculpture and painting arts are related, with the phrase "as in Natya, so in Citra". This relationship links them in rasa (aesthetics) and as forms of expression.

=== The painting ===
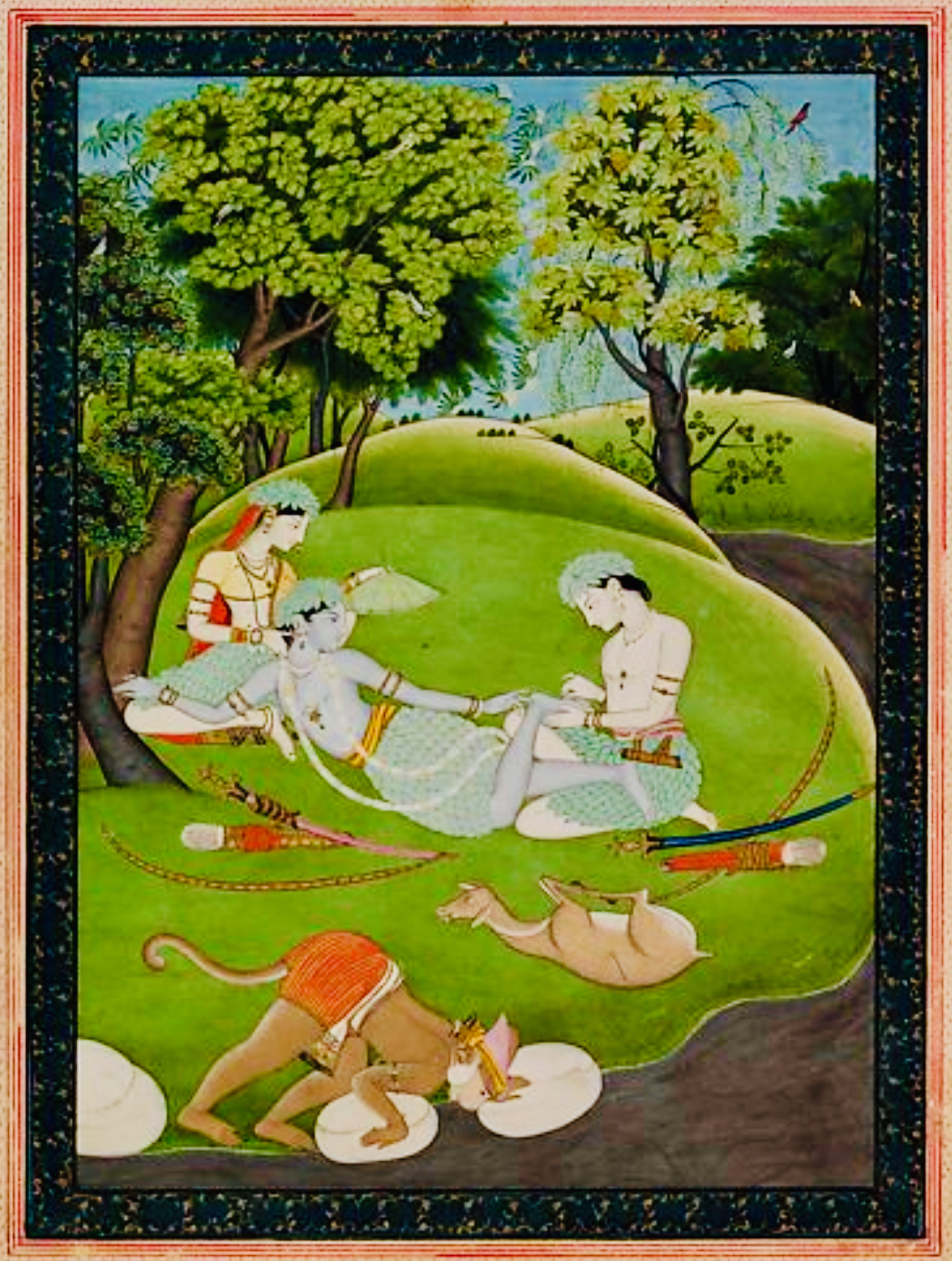
A 1780 CE painting of a Ramayana scene in Kangra-school style; Rama and Sita in forest, Lakshmana removing thorn

A chitra is a form of expression and communication. According to Aparajitaprccha – a 12th-century text on arts and architecture, just like the water reflects the moon, a chitra reflects the world. It is a rupa (form) of how the painter sees or what the painter wants the viewer to observe or feel or experience.

Chitra are usually installed in sala (halls or rooms).

The ornaments of a painting are its lines, shading, decoration and colors, states the 6th-century Visnudharmottara Purana. It states that there are eight gunas (merits, features) of a chitra that the artist must focus on: (1) posture; (2) proportion; (3) the use of the plumb line; (4) charm; (5) detail (how much and where); (6) verisimilitude; (7) kshaya (loss, foreshortening) and; (8) vrddhi (gain). Among the dosas (demerits, faults) of a painting and related arts, states Chitrasutra, are lines that are weak or thick, absence of variety, errors in scale (oversized eyes, lips, cheeks), inconsistency across the canvas, deviations from the rules of proportion, improper posture or sentiment, and non-merging of colors.

Limbs of a painting

Two historical sets called "chitra anga", or "limbs of painting" are found in Indian texts. According to the Samarangana Sutradhara – an 11th-century Sanskrit text on Hindu architecture and arts, a painting has eight limbs:

- Vartika – manufacture of brushes
- Bhumibandhana – preparation of base, plaster, canvas
- Rekhakarma – sketching
- Varnakarma – coloring
- Vartanakarma – shading
- lekhakarana – outlining
- Dvikakarma – second and final lining
- Lepyakarma – final coating

According to Yashodhara's Jayamangala, a Sanskrit commentary on Kamasutra, there are sadanga (six limbs) (Note: Six limbs to any art or science is a popular classification, inspired by the Hindu tradition to reverentially mirror the famed "six limbs of the Vedanga".) in the art of alekhyam and chitra (drawing and painting):

- Rupa-bhedah, or form distinction; this requires a knowledge of characteristic marks, diversity, manifested forms that distinguish states of something in the same genus/class
- Pramanani, or measure; requires knowledge of measurement and proportion rules (talamana)
- Bhava yojanam, or emotion and its joining with other parts of the painting; requires understanding and representing the mood of the subject
- Lavanya yojanam, or rasa, charm; requires understanding and representing the inner qualities of the subject
- Sadrsyam, or resemblance; requires knowledge of visual correspondence across the canvas
- Varnika-bhanga or color-pigment-analysis; requires knowledge how colors distribute on the canvas and how they visually impact the viewer

These six limbs are arranged stylistically in two ways. First as a set of compound (Rupa-bhedah and Varnika-bhanda), a set of joining (middle two yojnam), and a set of single words (Pramanani and Sadrsyam). Second, states Victor Mair, the six limbs in this Hindu text are paired in a set of differentiation skills (first two), then a pair of aesthetic skills, and finally a pair of technical skills. These limbs parallel the 12th-century Six principles of Chinese painting of Xie He. (Note: The Hua Chi of Teng Ch'un, a 12th-century Chinese text, mentions the Buddhist temple of Nalanda with frescoes about the Buddha painted inside. It states that the Indian Buddhas look different from those painted by Chinese, as the Indian paintings have Buddha with larger eyes, their ears are curiously stretched and the Buddhas have their right shoulder bare. It then states that the artists first make a drawing of the picture, then paint a vermilion or gold colored base. It also mentions the use of ox-glue and a gum produced from peach trees and willow juice, with the artists preferring the latter. According to Coomaraswamy, the ox-glue in the Indian context mentioned in the Chinese text is probably the same as the recipe found in the Sanskrit text Silparatna, one where the base medium is produced from boiling buffalo skin in milk, followed by drying and blending process.) (Note: This process of producing a gelatinous paste for the base of wall paintings is explained in the Chitrakala chapter of the Manasollasa. This text suggests adding little amounts of colors to this lepana paste depending on what will be painted on top, and that such a base reduces fading or pealing over time.)

The six limbs in Jayamangala likely reflect the earliest and more established Hindu tradition for chitra. This is supported by the Chitrasutras found in the Vishnudharmottara Purana. They explicitly mention pramanani and lavanya as key elements of a painting, as well as discuss the other four of the six limbs in other sutras. The Chitrasutra chapters are likely from about the 4th or 5th-century. Numerous other Indian texts touch upon the elements or aspects of a chitra. For example, the Aparajitaprccha states that the essential elements of a painting are: citrabhumi (background), the rekha (lines, sketch), the varna (color), the vartana (shading), the bhusana (decoration) and the rasa (aesthetic experience).

=== The painter ===
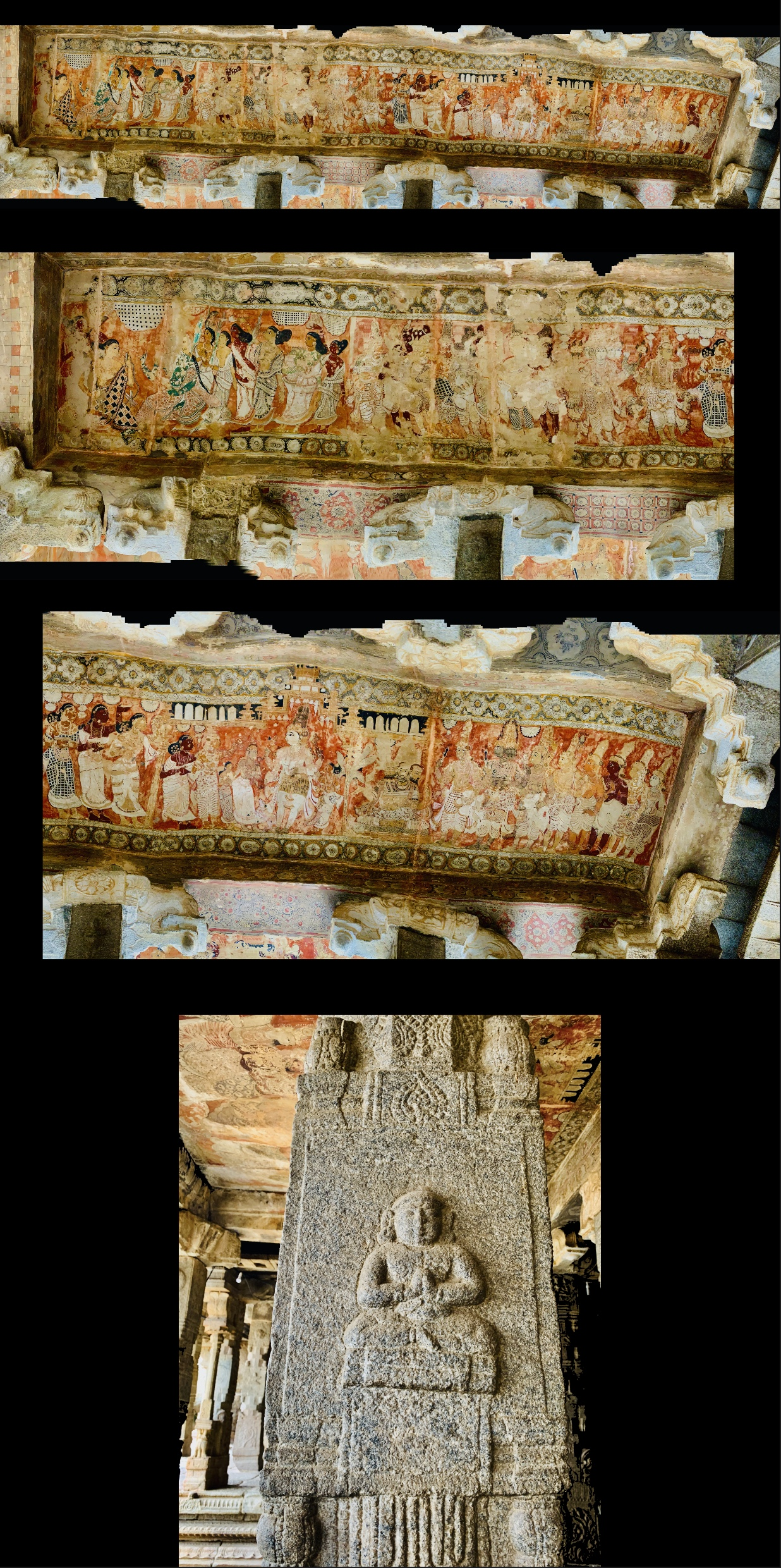
Some of the better preserved Vijayanagara-era chitra murals are in Virabhadra temple, Lepakshi, Andhra Pradesh. These include secular and religious paintings. Above: Parvati getting ready for her wedding to Shiva; the mandapa with painted ceiling in the background.

Historic Indian chitra (art) texts state that a painter (chitrakara or rupakara) must master the fundamentals of measurement and proportions. According to these historic texts, as noted by scholar Isabella Nardi, an expert painter must master measurement, characteristics of subjects, attributes, form, relative proportion, ornament, and beauty. According to the Chitrasutras, a skilled painter requires practice and must be capable of painting unadorned anatomical details, such as the neck, hands, feet, ears of living beings, as well as capturing dynamic elements like water waves, flames, smoke, and garments as they respond to the wind.

The Silparatna notes that painters depict all aspects of life, ranging from dharma (ethics), artha (wealth), and kama (desire), by repeatedly observing reality until every detail is stored in memory. According to the Sivatattva Ratnakara, a painter is well versed in sketching, astute with measurements, skilled in outlining (hastalekha), competent with colors, and ready to diligently mix and combine colors to create his chitra. The painter is a creative person with an inner sense of rasa (aesthetics).

=== The viewer ===
The painter should consider the diversity of viewers, states the Indian tradition of chitra. The experts and critics with much experience with paintings study the lines, shading and aesthetics, the uninitiated visitors and children enjoy the vibrancy of colors, while women tend to be attracted to the ornamentation of form and the emotions. A successful painter tends to captivate a variety of minds. A painter should remember that the visual and aesthetic impact of a painting triggers different responses in different audiences.

The Silparatna – a Sanskrit text on the arts, states that the painting should reflect its intended place and purpose. A theme suitable for a palace or gateway is different from that in a temple or the walls of a home. Scenes of wars, misery, death and suffering are not suitable paintings within homes, but these can be important in a chitrasala (museum with paintings). Auspicious paintings with beautiful colors such as those that cheer and enliven a room are better for homes, states Silparatna.

== Practice ==
According to the art historian Percy Brown, the painting tradition in India is ancient and the persuasive evidence are the oldest known murals at the Jogimara caves. The mention of chitra and related terms in the pre-Buddhist Vedic era texts, the chitra tradition is much older. It is very likely, states Brown, the pre-Buddhist structures had paintings in them. However, the primary building material in ancient India was wood, the colors were organic materials and natural pigments, which when combined with the tropical weather in India would naturally cause the painting to fade, damage and degrade over the centuries. It is not surprising, therefore, that sample paintings and historic evidence for chitra practice are unusual. The few notable surviving examples of chitra are found hidden in caves, where they would be naturally preserved a bit better, longer and would be somewhat protected from the destructive effects of wind, dust, water and biological processes.

Some notable, major surviving examples of historic paintings include:

- Murals at Jogimara cave (eight panels of murals, with a Brahmi inscription, 2nd or 1st century BCE, Hindu), oldest known ceiling paintings in India in remote Ramgarh hills of northern Chhattisgarh, below on wall of this cave is a Brahmi inscription in Magadhi language about a girl named Devadasi and a boy named Devadina (either they were lovers and wrote a love-graffiti per one translation, or they were partners who together converted natural caves here into a theatre with painted walls per another translation)
- Mural at Sitabhinji Group of Rock Shelters (c. 400 CE Ravanachhaya mural with an inscription, near a Shiva temple in remote Odisha, a non-religious painting), the oldest surviving example of a tempera painting in eastern states of India

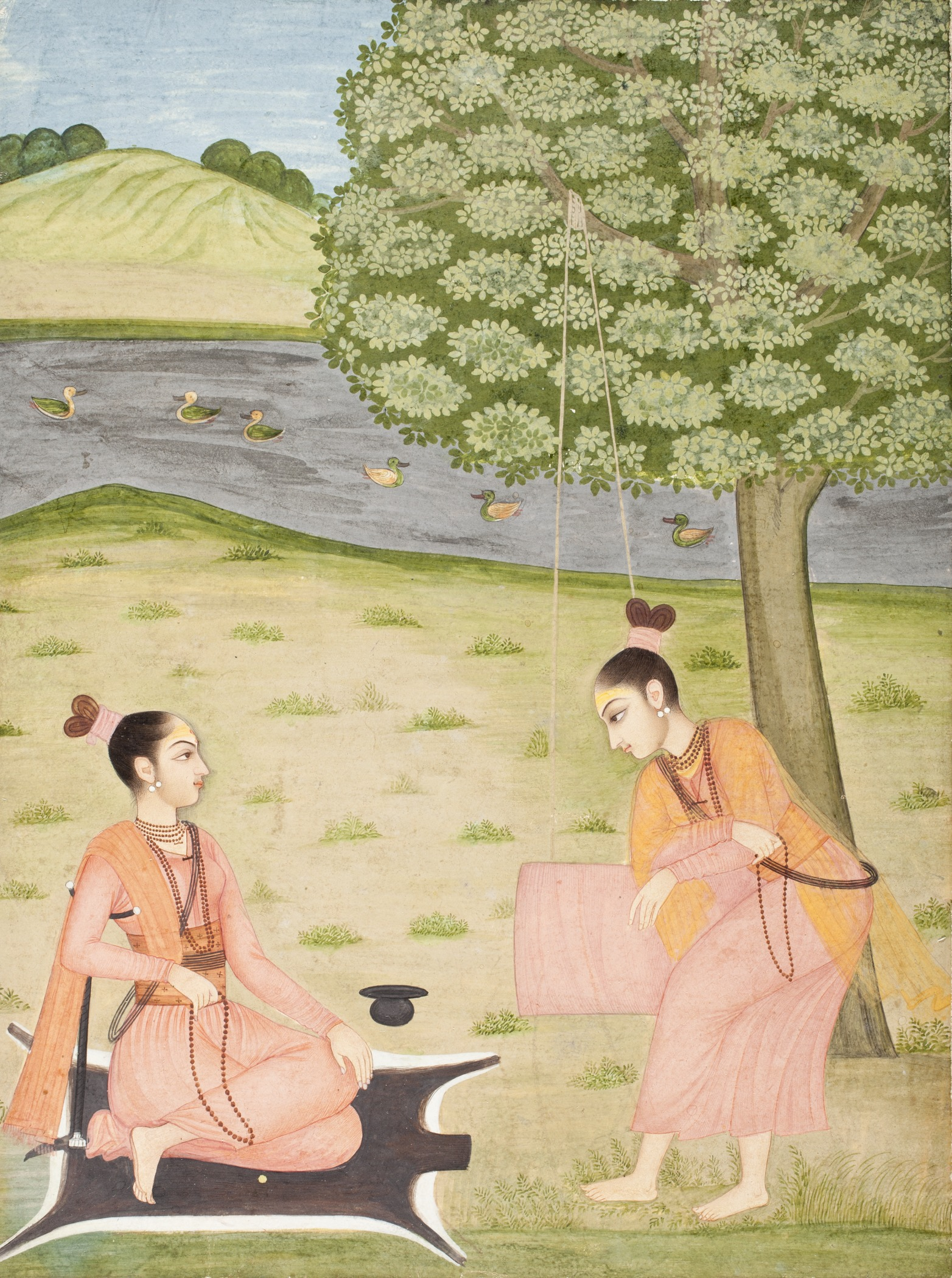
Yoginis, Rajput-school of chitrakala

- Murals at Ajanta Caves (Jataka tales, Buddhist), 5th-century CE, Maharashtra
- Murals at Badami Cave Temples (Hindu), 6th-century CE, Karnataka (secular paintings along with one of the earliest known painting of a Hindu legend about Shiva and Parvati inside a Vaishnava cave)
- Murals at Bagh Caves (Hallisalasya dance, Buddhist or Hindu), Madhya Pradesh
- Murals at Ellora Caves (Flying vidyadharas, Jain), Maharashtra
- Frescoes at Sittanavasal cave (Nature scenes likely representing places of Tirthankara sermons, Jain), Tamil Nadu
- Frescoes at Thirunadhikkara cave temple (Flowers and a woman, likely a scene of puja offering to Ganesha, another of Vishnu, Hindu)
- Paintings at the Brihadisvara temple (Dancer, Hindu), Tamil Nadu
- Manuscript paintings (numerous states such as Gujarat, Kashmir, Kerala, Odisha, Assam; also Nepal, Tibet; Buddhist, Jain, Hindu)
- Pattachitra (Hindu), Bengal & Odisha
- Vijayanagara temples (Hindu), Karnataka
- Chidambaram temple (Hindu), Tamil Nadu
- Chitrachavadi (Hindu, a choultry–mandapa near Madurai with Ramayana frescoes)
- Pahari paintings (Hindu), Himachal Pradesh and nearby regions
- Rajput paintings (Hindu), Rajasthan
- Deccan paintings (Hindu, Jain)
- Kerala paintings (Hindu)
- Telangana paintings (Hindu)
- Mughal paintings (Indo-Islamic)

== Contemporary culture ==
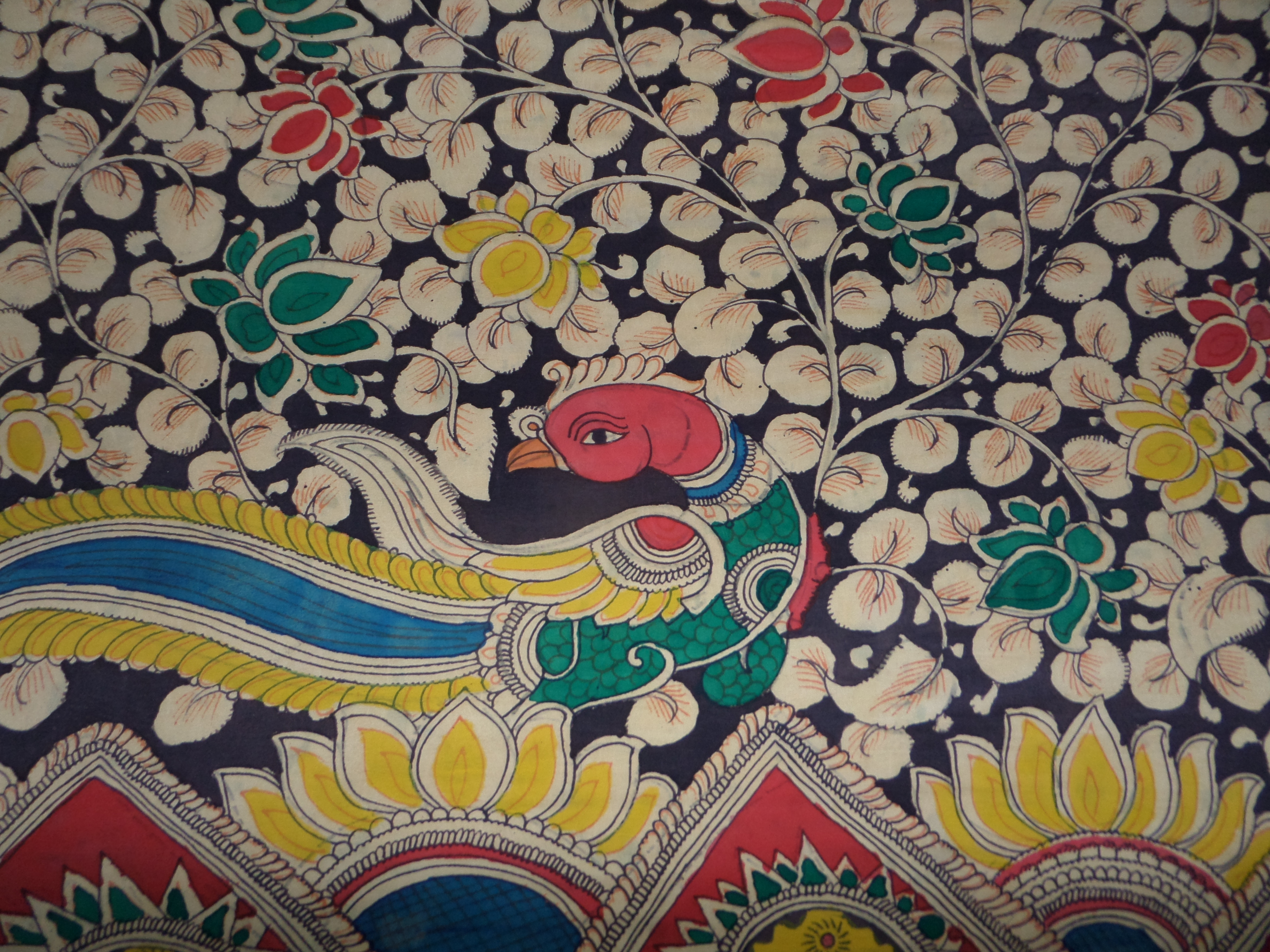
Kalamkari – a chitra on cloth, painted handicraft from Andhra Pradesh

- Kalamkari (Hindu)
- Pattas (Jain, Hindu), see Tirthpat

== See also ==
- Rasa (aesthetics)
- Classical Indian music
- Classical Indian dance

== Bibiliogaphy ==
- Yoko Taniguchi; Michiyo Mori (2021). Shigeo Aoki; Yoko Taniguchi; Stephen Rickerby (eds.). Conservation and Painting Techniques of Wall Paintings on the Ancient Silk Road. Springer Nature. ISBN 978-981-334-161-6.
- P. Arundhati (2003). Chitrakala in Manasollasa. Devarsons. ISBN 81-901708-0-5.
- T. Bloch (1906). Caves and Inscriptions in Ramgarh Hill, in Archaeological Survey Of India Annual Report 1903-4. pp. 123–131.
- Percy Brown (1918). The Heritage of India: Indian Painting. Association Press. ISBN 978-81-206-1888-6.
- Helle Bundgaard (2013). Indian Art Worlds in Contention: Local, Regional and National Discourses on Orissan Patta Paintings. Taylor & Francis. ISBN 978-1-136-80632-2.
- Ananda K. Coomaraswamy (1928). "Indian Architectural Terms". Journal of the American Oriental Society. 48. American Oriental Society: 250–275. doi:10.2307/593145. JSTOR 593145.
- Ananda K. Coomaraswamy (1930). "One Hundred References to Indian Painting". Artibus Asiae. 4 (1): 41–57. doi:10.2307/3248396. JSTOR 3248396.
- Ananda K. Coomaraswamy (1932). "Further References to Painting in India". Artibus Asiae. 4 (2/3): 126–129. doi:10.2307/3248516. JSTOR 3248516.
- Coomaraswamy, Ananda K. (1932). "Abhasa". Journal of the American Oriental Society. 52 (3): 208–212. doi:10.2307/593025. JSTOR 593025.
- Anjan Chakraverty (2005). Indian Miniature Painting. Lustre Press. ISBN 978-81-7436-334-3.
- Jagannatha P Das (2007). Chitra-pothi: Illustrated Palm-leaf Manuscripts from Orissa. Niyogi Books. ISBN 978-81-89738-06-8.
- Shrikant B. Dabhade (1955). The Technique of Wall Painting in Ancient India. Munshilal.
- H. Goetz (1949). "The Nāgaur School of Rājput Painting (18th Century)". Artibus Asiae. 12 (1/2): 89–98. doi:10.2307/3248310. JSTOR 3248310.
- Higuchi, Takayasu; Barnes, Gina (1995). "Bamiyan: Buddhist cave temples in Afghanistan". World Archaeology. 27 (2): 282–302. doi:10.1080/00438243.1995.9980308.
- Stella Kramrisch (1954). The Art of India: Traditions of Indian Sculpture, Painting, and Architecture. Phaidon Publishers. ISBN 9788120801820. OCLC 16539346.
- Stella Kramrisch (1928). The Vishṇudharmottaram, part III. A treatise on Indian painting. Calcutta University Press. OCLC 504043783.
- Ku, Hawon (2014). "Representations of Ownership: The Nineteenth-Century Painted Maps of Shatrunjaya, Gujarat". Journal of South Asian Studies. 37 (1). Taylor & Francis: 3–21. doi:10.1080/00856401.2013.852289. S2CID 145090864.
- Clay Lancaster (1952). "Keys to the Understanding of Indian and Chinese Painting: The "Six Limbs" of Yaṣoḍhara and the "Six Principles" of Hsieh Ho (Special Issue on Oriental Art and Aesthetics)". The Journal of Aesthetics and Art Criticism. 11 (2). JSTOR 426036.
- G. E. Marrison (1969). "Kīrtana-Ghoṣā, an Illustrated Assamese Manuscript". The British Museum Quarterly. 33 (3/4): 108–110. doi:10.2307/4423027. JSTOR 4423027.
- Isabella Nardi (2007). "The concepts of Painting and the Figure of the Painter as Described in Selected Sanskrit Sources". Archiv Orientální. 75 (3).
- Parul Dave Mukherji (2001). विष्णुधर्मोत्तरपुराणीयं चित्रसूत्रम् (The Citrasutra of the Vishnudharmottara Purana). Motilal Banarsidass Publishers. ISBN 978-81-208-1805-7.
- Isabella Nardi (2007b). The Theory of Citrasutras in Indian Painting: A Critical Re-evaluation of their Uses and Interpretations. Routledge. ISBN 978-1-134-16523-0.
- Isabella Nardi (2019). Portraits of Devotion: Popular Manorath Paintings from Nathdwara in the Collection of Anil Relia. Mapin Publishing. ISBN 978-93-85360-67-1.
- Dinanath Pathy (1981). Mural Paintings in Orissa. Orissa Lalit Kala Akademi.
- Ponte, Inês (2015). "Cosmopolitan impressions from a contemporary Bengali patachitra painting museum collection in Portugal". Ateliers d'anthropologie (41). doi:10.4000/ateliers.9771.
- Sarkar, Bikramjit (2017). "The Art of Traditional Painting in Assam: a Critical Study on the Manuscript Paintings of Bhagavata-Purana, VI-VII" (PDF). The Chitrolekha Journal on Art and Design. 1 (2). doi:10.21659/cjad.12.v1n203.
- C. Sivaramamurti (1996). Indian Painting. India Book House. ISBN 8123720149. OCLC 977530313.
- C. Sivaramamurti (1978b). Chitrasutra of the Vishnudharmottara. Kanal Publications. OCLC 5856266.
- C. Sivaramamurti (1968). South Indian Paintings. National Museum. ISBN 978-81-230-0052-7.
- C. Sivaramamurti (1978). The painter in ancient India. National Museum. ISBN 9788123000527. OCLC 963176976.
- Upinder Singh (2008). A History of Ancient and Early Medieval India: From the Stone Age to the 12th Century. Pearson Education India. ISBN 978-81-317-1120-0.
- P. S. Sriraman (2011). Chola Murals: Documentation and Study of the Chōl̲a Murals of Bṛihadīśvara Temple, Thanjavur. Archaeological Survey of India. ISBN 978-0-230-33081-8.
- Yoshiko Shimadzu (2021). Shigeo Aoki; Yoko Taniguchi; Stephen Rickerby (eds.). Conservation and Painting Techniques of Wall Paintings on the Ancient Silk Road. Springer Nature. ISBN 978-981-334-161-6.
- Shimizu, Tadashi (1966). "Some Aspects of Mediaeval Indian Painting in the Visnudharmottarapurana". Journal of Indian and Buddhist Studies (Indogaku Bukkyogaku Kenkyu). 15 (1). Japanese Association of Indian and Buddhist Studies: 426–422. doi:10.4259/ibk.15.426. ISSN 1884-0051.
- Victor Mair (2004). Zongqi Cai (ed.). Xie He's "Six Laws" of Painting and Their Indian Parallels (Chapter 3 in Chinese Aesthetics by Editor: Zongqi Cai). University of Hawaii Press. ISBN 978-0-8248-2791-5.
- Monier Monier Williams (2007). Sanskrit English Dictionary (Updated). Harvard University Press (Original published in 1899 by Oxford University Press).
- Paola von Wyss-Giacosa (2018). "Myth and Cloth from India: The Kalamkari Collection in the Ethnographic Museum of the University of Zurich". Narrative Culture. 5 (1). Wayne State University Press: 34. doi:10.13110/narrcult.5.1.0034.
- Kapila Vatsyayan (2014). Dance In Indian Painting. Abhinav Publications. ISBN 978-81-7017-153-9.
