= Gouraya Palli =

Gouraya Palli is a village in Cherial mandal in Siddipet district in the state of Telangana in India. For this location there are alternate spellings: Gouraipalli, Gourayapalli.

== Population ==
The population of the village is approximately 2000–3000.
