= Magdumpur =

- Village in India
- Location of Magdumpur in Telangana Magdumpur (India)
- Coordinates: 18°18′N 77°54′E
- Country: India
- State: Telangana
- Region: Telangana
- District: Siddipet
- Postal code: 502 375

Magdumpur also known as "Makhdumpur/Modumpally", is a village in Nangunoor Mandal of Siddipet district, Telangana, India.
