= Husnabad =

- Town
- Location in Telangana, India
- Coordinates: 18°7′38.087″N 79°12′27.488″E
- Country: India
- State: Telangana
- District: Siddipet
- Talukas: Husnabad

Government
  - Type: Municipality
  - Body: HUSNABAD Municipality
  - MLA: Ponnam Prabhakar Goud
  - M.P: Bandi Sanjay kumar
  - Municipality Chairman: Dhandi Lakshmi

Area
  - Total: 24.06 km^{2} (9.29 sq mi)

Population (2026)
  - Total: 38,653
  - Density: 1,607/km^{2} (4,161/sq mi)

Languages
  - Official: Telugu
- Time zone: UTC+5:30 (IST)
- PIN: 505467
- Telephone code: 91-8721
- Vehicle registration: TG 36
- Vidhan Sabha constituency: Husnabad

Husnabad is a town, municipality, and Revenue Division headquarters in Siddipet district of the Indian state of Telangana. Emerging as a major administrative, educational, and healthcare hub, Husnabad is widely regarded as a strong contender for future elevation as a district headquarters due to its strategic location, expanding public infrastructure, and regional significance.

The town serves as the headquarters of Husnabad Mandal and Husnabad Revenue Division, catering to several surrounding mandals. Husnabad has witnessed rapid institutional growth with the establishment of the Satavahana University College of Engineering, which serves students from Karimnagar, Siddipet, Hanumakonda, and Jangaon regions.

In the healthcare sector, Husnabad is being developed into a regional medical center with a 250-bed government hospital complex and a sanctioned Postgraduate Medical Centre with 50 PG medical seats, significantly enhancing its role as a healthcare destination in north-central Telangana.

Due to its position at the crossroads of Warangal–Siddipet and Karimnagar–Jangaon, Husnabad serves as an everyday hub for governance, schooling, healthcare, business, and travel, putting it in a position to be named a district headquarters.

== Geography ==
It is a mandal headquarters of Husnabad mandal in Siddipet district. Husnabad is situated partly on line of hills which passes through the town from South-west to North-east. Yellama Cheruvu is on the south side of the town. Husnabad is 38 km (24 mi) from Karimnagar, 41 km (25 mi) from Siddipet, 52 km (32 mi) from Warangal and 135 km from Hyderabad.

Husnabad Mandal has a total 11 villages which includes 1 Husnabad 2 Mirzapur 3 Nagaram 4 Mohammadapur 5 Madudha 6 Ummapur 7 potlapally 8 Potharam (S) 9 Thotapally (S) 10 Kuchanpally 11 Pandilla.

== History ==
The town of Husnabad was part of Karimnagar district in the state of Hyderabad state from 1948 to 1956. Then it became part of Andhra Pradesh state till 2014 and later on June 2, 2014 It became part of newly formed state of Telangana. In 2016 the mandal of Husnabad along with Bejjanki and Koheda from Karimnagar district merged into newly formed Siddipet district. Husnabad was made as a revenue division in 2016 during the formation of new districts in Telangana.The old name of husnabad is Bhargavapuram later it's renamed as Husnabad.Asia 2nd largest stupa named (Amaraveerula stupam) was located in Husnabad which was later destroyed by police forces.

== Transport ==
Husnabad is connected with roads on four sides with major cities like Warangal 50 km (31 mi) to the east, Karimnagar 40 km (25 mi) to the north, Siddipet 40 km (25 mi) to the west and Jangaon 53 km (33 mi) to the south.TSRTC operates buses to Karimnagar, Hyderabad, Nizamabad, Warangal, Godavarikhani, Siddipet and surrounding villages and mandals.
