= Baswapur =

- village
- Interactive map of Baswapur
- Country: India
- State: Telangana
- District: Siddipet
- Named for: The Nirmal Puraskar Village in Gajwel Constituency.

Government
  - Type: Democracy
  - Body: Sarpanch
  - MLA: K. Chandrashekar Rao (TRS)
  - MP: Kotha Prabhakar Reddy (TRS)

Population (2011)
  - Total: 1,362

Languages
  - Official: Telugu
- Time zone: UTC+5:30 (IST)
- PIN: 502301
- Telephone code: 08454
- Vehicle registration: TS36
- Nearest city: Hyderabad
- Assembly constituency: Gajwel
- Parliament constituency: Medak

Baswapur is a village in Siddipet district of Telangana, India. It falls under Jagadevpur mandal.

- It belongs to Telangana region
- It is located 96 km towards East from Sangareddi
- 10 km from Jagdevpur
- 73 km from State capital Hyderabad Baswapur Pin code is 502301 and postal head office is Kuknoorpally
- Munigadapa (3 km), Wattipalle (3 km), Chatlapalle (3 km), Chinna Kistapur (4 km), Rayavaram (7 km) are the nearby Villages to Baswapur
- Baswapur is surrounded by Kondapak Mandal towards North, Gajwel Mandal towards west, Rajapet Mandal towards South, Cheriyal Mandal towards East
- Siddipet, Jangaon, Bhongir, Sircilla are the nearby Cities to Baswapur
- This Place is in the border of the Medak District and Nalgonda District
- Nalgonda District Rajapet is South towards this place
- Demographics of Baswapur Telugu is the Local Language here
- Total population of Baswapur is 1392. Male are 710 and Female are 682 living in 284 houses.
- Total area of Baswapur is 308 hectares.
