= Panachikkadu Temple =

Hindu temple in Kerala, India

- Saraswathi shrine of Panachikkadu Temple

- Dakshina Saraswathi Temple, Panachikkad, Kottayam, Kerala

Religion
- Affiliation: Hinduism
- District: Kottayam
- Deity: Dakshina Mookambika (Saraswathi)
- Festival: Navaratri

Location
- Location: Panachikkad
- State: Kerala
- Country: India
- Interactive map of Panachikkadu Temple
- Coordinates: 9°32′16.4″N 76°33′09.4″E

Architecture
- Type: Architecture of Kerala

Specifications
- Temple: One
- Elevation: 40.18 m (132 ft)

Panachikkadu Vishnu shrine

The Panachikkadu Temple or Panachikkad Saraswathi Temple, also known as the Dakshina Mookambika (Mookambika of the South) Saraswathy Temple, is a Hindu temple dedicated to the goddess Saraswati. The temple is located in the southern region of the Indian Peninsula, in Panachikkad in Kottayam District, Kerala, India. The main deity of the temple is Vishnu, who was installed before Saraswati. There are sub-shrines for Shiva, Ganapathi, Ayyappan, Snake deities and Panachikkattu Yakshi inside the temple.

== Gallery ==
East gate to Vishnu shrine

West entrance

Temple tank

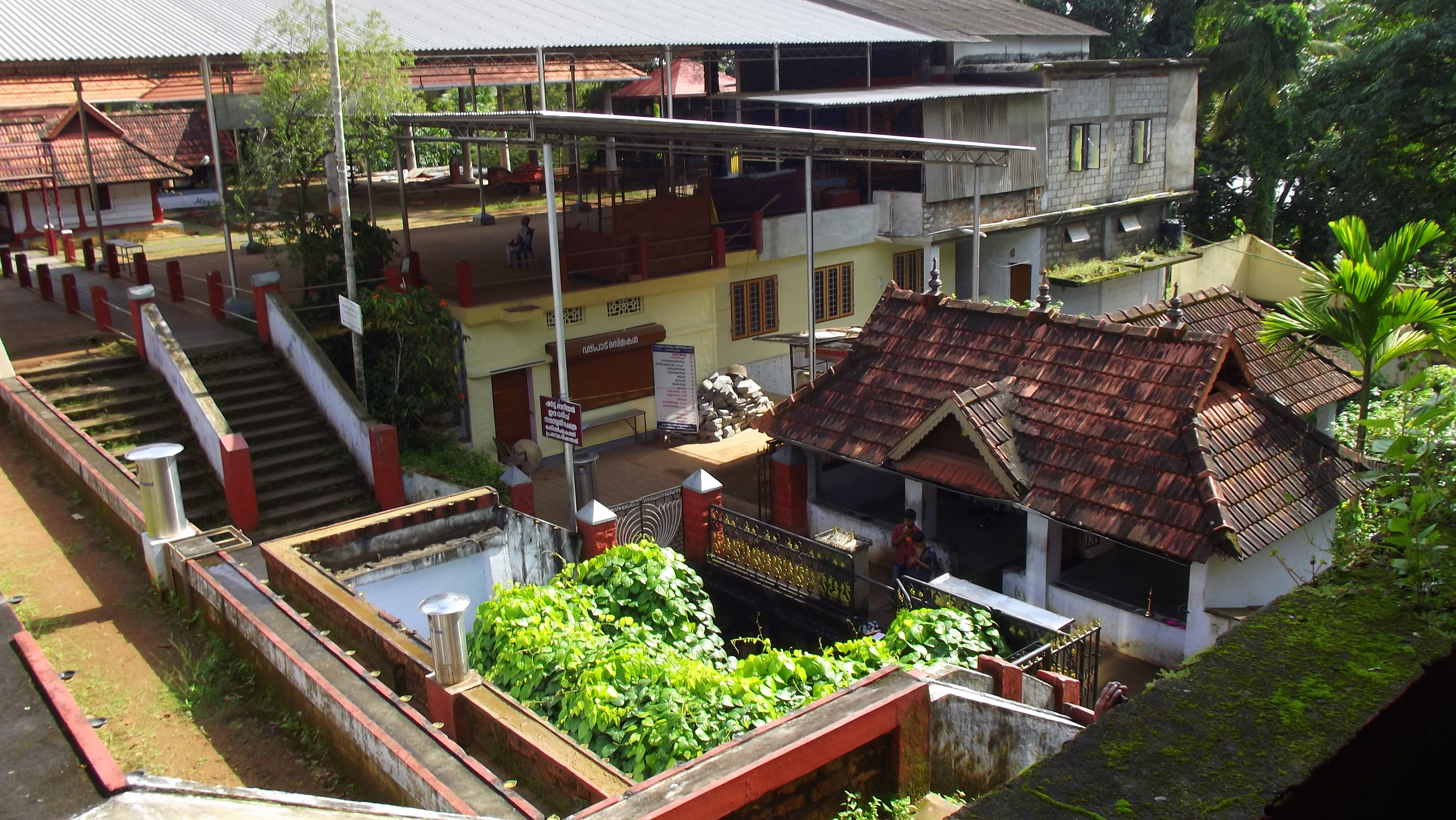
Saraswathi shrine in 2012

== See also ==
- Temples of Kerala
- Saraswathi Temple
