= Konaipally =

Konaipalle
- Village
- Country: India
- State: Telangana
- District: Siddipet
- Mandal: Nangnur
- Time zone: UTC+5:30 (IST)

Konaipalle is a village in the siddipet district of Telangana, India. It falls under the Nangnur mandal. It is located 12.5 km distance from its constituency, Siddipet. Konaipalle came under the Medak district before the formation of new districts in Telangana. Presently, Konaipalle belongs to siddipet district.

The famous Lord Venkateshwara temple is located here. Kalvakuntla chandrasheker rao usually offers prayers before every nomination from his first elections since 1985. It became a tradition for him. Thaneeru Harish Rao also does these same. The temple was constructed in the 1980s by the devotees. The present temple was a renovated one during the 2020s with a cost of 3.5 crores. Usually in February, a 3-day fair will be conducted by devotees. On the very first day, Lord Venkateshwara Swamy Kanam will be conducted. On the second and third day, Annadanam (food donation), Edland a uregimpu (Bullock cart parade) will be conducted, respectively.
