= Mahender =

Mahender may refer to several people:

In arts and entertainment:

- Mahender Singh Shekhawat, a writer of Rajasthani literature
- S. Mahender, director of the films Preethigagi and Gandana Mane (seeKannada films of 2007)

In politics:

- P. Mahender Reddy, an Indian politician and legislator from Tandur, Telangana state, India
- Mahender Buddha, village leader of Jagadevpur, Andhra Pradesh
- Mahender Rawat, a leader in the Uttarakhand Kranti Dal political party in India
- Mahender Singh, transport minister and deputy for Dharampur in the Legislative Assembly of Himachal Pradesh

Other people:

- Mahender Sabhnani, an American perfume maker convicted for slavery
- Raja Mahendra Pratap Singh (1886–1979), a freedom fighter, journalist, writer and revolutionary social reformist of India
- Mahender Rathor, an Indian sports official coach of the India national basketball team

Fictional characters:

- Mahender, a fictional character in the film Ijaazat
- Thakur Mahender Pratap Singh, a fictional character in the Indian horror film Veerana
- Balu Mahendar, a fictional a character in the 2007 Kannada film Hudugaata
