= Kadavergu =

- village
- Location in Telangana, India Kadavergu (India)
- Coordinates: 17.909722°N 78.941389°E
- Country: India
- State: Telangana
- District: Warangal
- Elevation: 302 m (991 ft)

Languages
  - Official: Telugu
- Time zone: UTC+5:30 (IST)
- Vehicle registration: TS

Kadavergu is a village located in the Cheriyal mandal of the Siddipet district of Telangana state, India. According to the 2001 census, the village had a population of 5,435.

The village was known as early as 1200 AD. The people in those days used to believe the Lord Shiva. During fighting between Shiva devotees and Vishnu devotees, gradually people were destroyed by the King Anantha Varma, a devotee of Lord Vishnu.

Kadavergu has become a surname for people who lived in the area in those days. Later they formed into a society called Neelakanta (the worshippers of God Shiva).
