= Jagdeo =

Jagdeo may refer to:

- Jagdeo Prasad, Indian politician
- Jagdeo Singh, Trinidadian politician and lawyer
- Bharrat Jagdeo, Guyanese politician, President of Guyana from 1999 to 2011
- Kendall Jagdeosingh, Trinidadian footballer
- Jagdeo, Pakistan, village in Punjab, Pakistan

== See also ==
- Jagadevpur (disambiguation)
- Jagadeva, 11th-12th century prince of the Paramara dynasty of central India
