= Vadlur =

Coordinates: 18.334433°N 79.038058°E

Vadlur or Vadloor
- village
- Interactive map of Vadlur or Vadloor
- Country: India
- State: Telangana

Government
  - Type: public representative body
  - Sarpanch: Naluvala Swamy

Languages
  - Official: Telugu
- Time zone: UTC+5:30 (IST)
- Postal code: 505530
- Vehicle registration: TS 36
- Website: vadloor.in

Naluvala Swamy
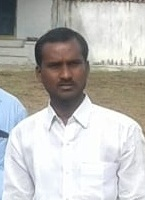

Vadlur or vadloor is a village in Bejjanki mandal, Siddipet district, Telangana, India.

It is located at Latitude: 11.55 / Longitude: 79.55

Present Vadlur or Vadloor Sarpanch is NALUVALA SWAMY
