= Sirisinagandla =

Sirisinagandla, India
- Village
- Location in Telangana, India Sirisinagandla, India (India)
- Coordinates: 17.99°N 78.83°E
- Country: India
- State: Telangana
- District: Medak
- Elevation: 514 m (1,686 ft)

Languages
  - Official: Telugu
- Time zone: UTC+5:30 (IST)
- PIN: 502372
- Telephone code: +91-8457
- Vehicle registration: TS
- Nearest city: Siddipet
- Lok Sabha constituency: Siddipet
- Vidhan Sabha constituency: Gajwel
- Website: telangana.gov.in

Sirisinagandla is a village (gram panchayat) in Kondapak Mandal, Medak district in the Indian state of Telangana, India.
