= Aparajitaprccha =

Historic text on Indian architecture and arts

The Aparajitaprccha (lit. "the questions of Aparajit") is a 12th-century Sanskrit text of Bhuvanadeva with major sections on architecture (Vastu Shastra) and arts (Kala). Predominantly a Hindu text, it largely reflects the north and western Indian traditions. The text also includes chapters on Jain architecture and arts. The text is notable for its sections on temple architecture (vastu), sculpture (shilpa), painting (chitra) and classical music and dance (sangita, nritya).

Several incomplete manuscripts of Aparajitaprccha were discovered in Gujarat in early 20th-century (particularly Baroda), and others later in central and north India. It has at least 239 sutras, each sutra followed by many verses. This collection is called sutrasantana, and thus extends into over 7500 verses. The first edition and translation of the text was published by Popatbhai Mankad in 1950, while Lal Mani Dubey published another critical study with translation and bhasya (commentary) on the text in 1987.

The exact date of its composition is unclear. The generally accepted range is sometime between 1000 and 1200 CE based on its language, internal evidence such as those it cites and iconography it recommends, as well as matching its specific teachings with actual temples built and which can be dated with confidence. However, peculiar details such as subtle measurements for moldings specified in it, as well as its specifications for deity Vayu and Yama suggests that the final edition of the Aparajitaprccha was likely completed in the 12th-century. The Aparajitaprccha shows significant influences from Samarangana Sutradhara, another major Hindu vastu and shilpa sastra text that has survived into the modern age. It acknowledges this influence and elaborates the principles. The different manuscripts of Aparajitaprccha show variations, likely errors created as the manuscript was interpolated and copied over the centuries.

Significance

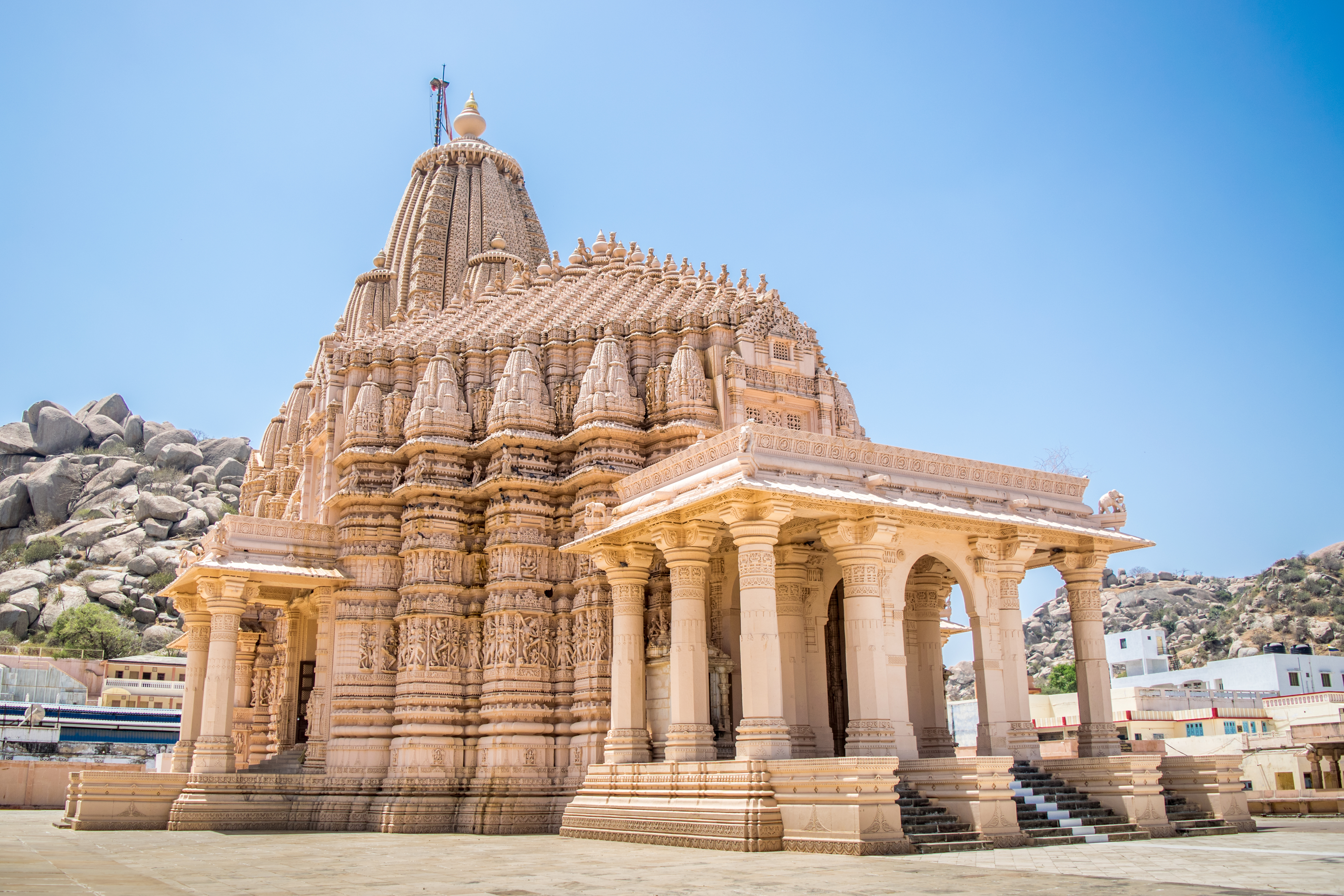
The Ajitanatha Jain temple at Taranga follows specifications in the Aparajitaprccha text, as do Hindu temples in Siddhapur and Prabhasa-Patana.

Though incomplete and with errors, the Aparajitaprccha is one of the six best known, influential and most complete Hindu treatises on architecture and iconography that have survived. The text lists and discusses the various designs of temples, housing, water infrastructure, sculpture, pillars, domes, arrangement of architectural space (chanda) and such topics. Some sections present the theory behind Hindu and Jain temples in north and western parts of India, useful in appreciating the Maru-Gurjara style of intricately carved architecture found in the temples of Rajasthan and Gujarat.

According to Vohra and Dhaky, known for publications and a multi-volume encyclopedia on Indian architecture, the Aparajitaprccha is one of the "few and most valuable texts on the Nagara school of architecture". The text includes sections that digress into Hindu puranic summaries that has little to do with architecture, it also has many sections where there are "cogent and perfectly detailed statements about the canons of architecture", state Vohra and Dhaky. Its discussion on complex large Nagara-style temples is one of the oldest and most complete, particularly in the context of historic temples of western regions of India. Its canonical guidelines are followed in highly ornate Hindu and Jain marble-stone temples built after the 11th-century, and sections of the text are found in traditional shilpin families in Gujarat, Rajasthan and nearby regions.

== See also ==
- Manasollasa
- Manasara
