= Guruvannapeta =

Village in Telangana, India

- town
- Location in Telangana, India Guruvannapeta (India)
- Coordinates: 17°51′00″N 78°41′00″E
- Country: India
- State: Telangana

Languages
  - Official: Telugu
- Time zone: UTC+5:30 (IST)
- Vehicle registration: TS
- Website: telangana.gov.in

Guruvannapeta is a village situated in Komuravelli mandal and an MLA (Member of Legislative Assembly) constituency in the Siddipet district in the state of Telangana, India.

== Size and population ==
Guruvannapeta is spread across 5,659 acres (22.90 km^{2}) of land. There are approximately 600 houses. As per 1991 census, Guruvannapeta consists of 5,320 population.

- Electores ( 2006 ):

Male : 579
Female : 605
Total : 1184

== Economy ==
Agriculture is the primary source of income. There are no special minerals found in this region.

== Education ==
Guruvannapeta has 1 primary school and 1 high school.
