= Kondapak =

- Location in Telangana, India Kondapak (India)
- Coordinates: 17.97°N 78.85°E
- Country: India
- State: Telangana
- District: Siddipet
- Elevation: 506 m (1,660 ft)

Languages
  - Official: Telugu
- Time zone: UTC+5:30 (IST)
- PIN: 502372
- Telephone code: +91-8457
- Vehicle registration: TG
- Website: telangana.gov.in

Kondapak is a village in the Siddipet district of India's Telangana state. The village is surrounded by a nest of 7 Hills, 7 tranquil lakes, 7 glorious Hanuman Temples, 7 silent village foundation stones, and 7 saptanabhi shilas lies this abode of art and architecture.

== History ==
Meolithic, Neolithic and Sangam age Evidence

Mallesham Gutta contains significant evidence of early human habitation and activities. The site features multiple artifacts including pottery of various types (red, black, brown, and red-and-black wares) decorated with geometric designs. Evidence of tool-making is present through visible tool grooves on rocks. Cup marks have been carved into black granite, suggesting ritual or functional purposes. Limestone was utilized for construction and tools. Rock weapons and grinding stones—sharpened using water on natural rock surfaces—indicate food processing and hunting activities. Rock shelters provided natural refuge for these early inhabitants.

Structural evidence includes two small dolmens (stone burial monuments) located at the corners of the gutta. Beads made from materials like stone and shell, strung with fine threads, have been discovered. A glass industry appears to have operated in the area, producing beads, glass items, and pottery. A small pond on the summit of the gutta provided water resources.

Medieval Period: Kalyani Chalukya Era

An inscription on Mallesham Gutta, dated to the Kalyani Chalukya period, was written by the poet Lakshmi Devi, who held the title of Bala Saraswati. She was the wife of King Tribhuvana Malla Deva. The inscription documents the donation of the gutta to the goddess Bhagavathi. Archaeological evidence includes sculptures of: - Nandi (the sacred bull) - Swayambu Shiva Lingam (self-manifested) - Chamundi Goddess (identified by historians as possibly representing Bhagavathi)

The Chamundi sculpture depicts her riding a lion with her foot on a bull.

Medieval Period: Kakatiyas

Rudreshwaralayam Temple (1125 CE) An inscription from the reign of Ganapati Deva documents the donation of this temple to three deities: Itheshwara, Somanatha, and Keshava Narayana. The temple features: - Stone sculptures of a cobra, trishul, and Shiva lingam - Saptha Matrikas (Seven Mothers) with their respective vehicles at the entrance

Trikuteshwaralayam Temple (1194 CE) This inscription, from the reign of King Rudradeva, states the temple was constructed at the desire of Ekkateelu. Features include: - Three connected temples - Gaja Lakshmi (Lakshmi with elephants) - Stone doors with kavachas (protective coverings) - Stone windows with carved decorative elements and door locks

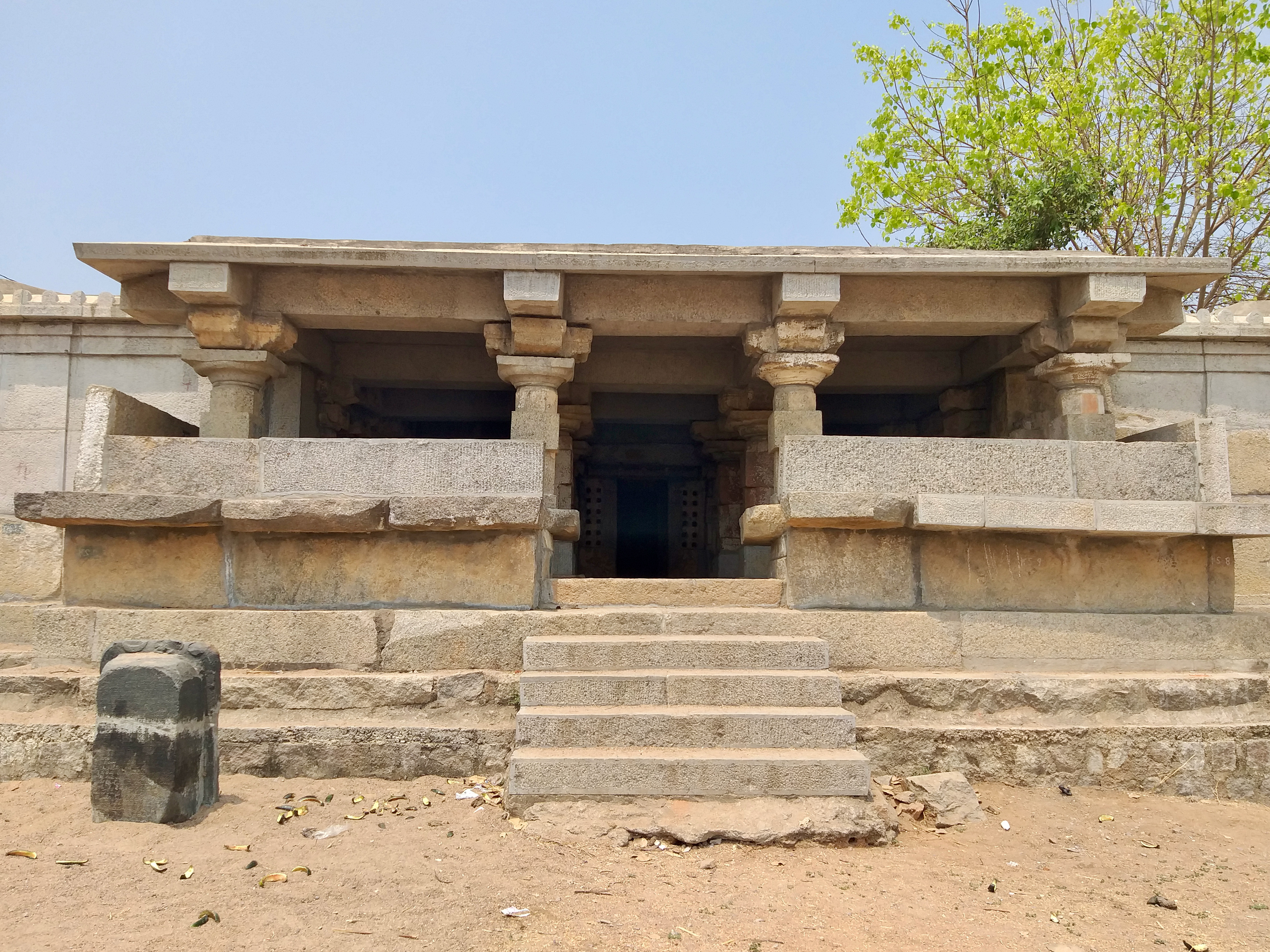
Trikuteshwaralayam

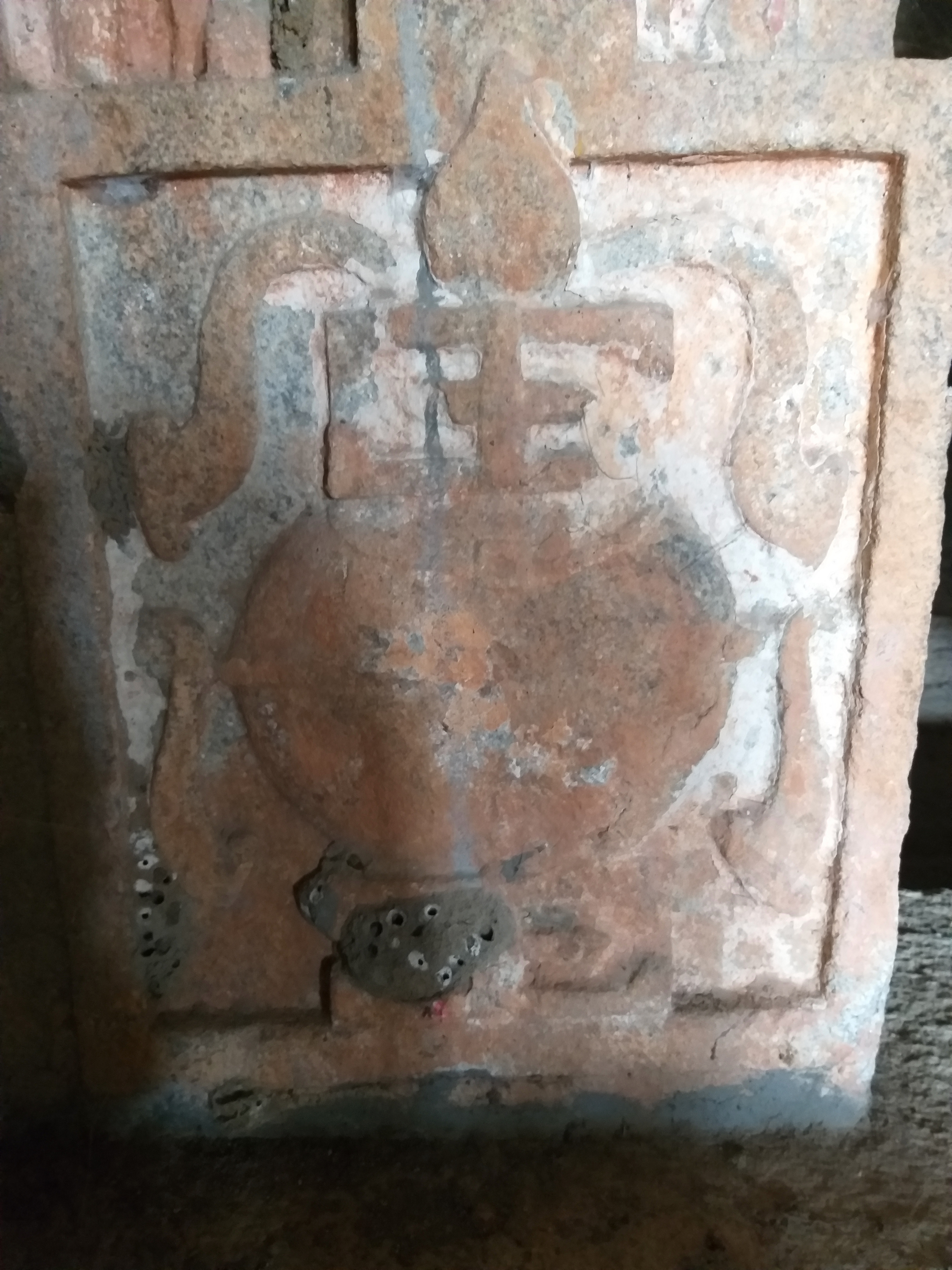
kalasham in trikuteshwaralayam

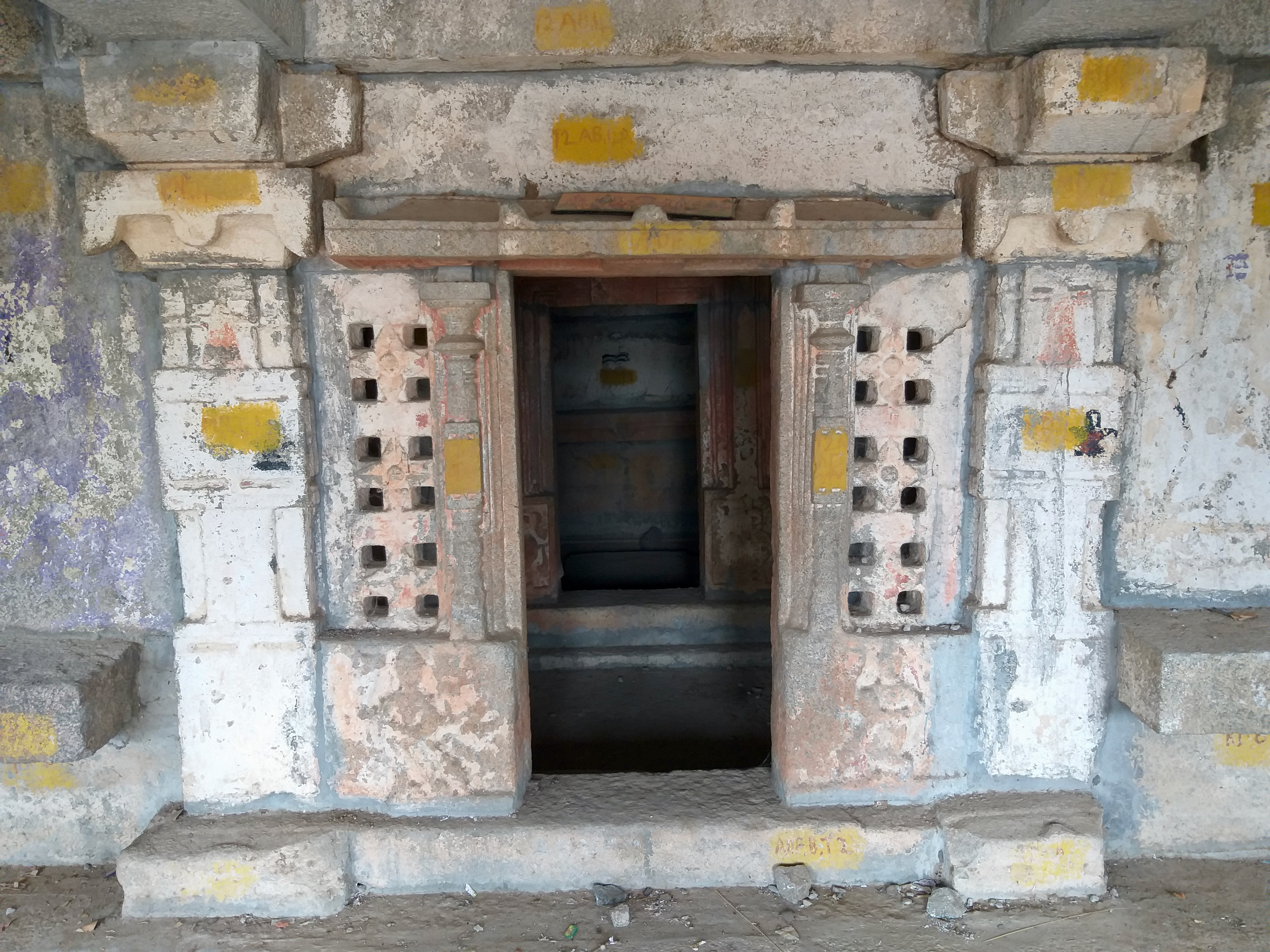
Stone Windows in Trikuteshwaralayam

Both temples were later revived by local community members.

== Geography ==
Kondapak is a model village located 90 km from Hyderabad and 15 km from the busy commercial district of Siddipet in Telangana, India on Rajiv Rahadari. In the picturesque harmony of dense green forests, in a nest of 7 Hills, 7 tranquil lakes, 7 glorious Hanuman Temples, 7 silent village foundation stones(saptanabhi shilas) lies this abode of art and architecture. Thus this village is glorified with number seven. Its cultural heritage dates back to the Kakatiya Dynasty.

Kondapak has two temples in its Northern Part. One is Sri Rudreshwaralayam and another one is Sri Trikooteswaralayam. These temples exemplify the sculpture and architectural traditions of the area and represent the village symbolically.

Kondapak Village covers an area of approximately 2.5 km^{2}., and has a population of approximately 15,000 as of 2010. The Kondapak village boundary of the Medak district, the village is bounded on the North by the Nacharam village, on the south by Thimmareddypalli village, on the west by Dhammakkapalli, and on the East by Komaravelli and Arepalli Village. Paddy the main agricultural products cultivated in the village. Some places of historical importance in Kondapak Village are Temples and Schools.

The culture of Kondapak has been shaped by its long history, unique geography, diverse demographics and the absorption of customs, traditions and ideas from some of its neighbours.

Kondapak is characterized by a diverse range of religious practices, languages, customs, and traditions. These cultural influences have developed through the blending of different communities and traditions, shaping the region’s cultural identity and contributing to its influence beyond its local boundaries.

== Notable people ==
- Ananthula Madan Mohan

== List of villages ==
Sirisinagandla, Marpadaga, Duddeda, Thimmareddy pally, Kuknurpalle, Lakudaram, Medinpur, Dammakkapally, Ankireddy Pally, Thoguta, Tukkapur, Bandaram, Bandarupalle, Etigaddakistapur, Vellikattu, Vemulaghat, Yellareddy peta, [Erravally, Mangole, Zapti Nacharam, Khammam Pally, Nagireddipally, Giraipalle, Odencheruvu, Pedda Masanpalle, Thurka Kashi Nagar, Konai pally, Thipparam, Bobbaipally, Singaram, Mathe pally, Ramunipally, Domalonipally, Sarlapally, Muddapur, Ambedkarnagar and Pitalawada.
