= Markook =

Markook may refer to:

- Markook, Telangana, India
- Markook shrek, a type of flatbread
