= Raipole =

Raipole Rayapole
- Mandal
- Country: India
- State: Telangana

Languages
  - Official: Telugu
- Time zone: UTC+5:30 (IST)
- PIN: 502278
- Telephone code: 040
- Vehicle registration: TG-36

Raipole is a Mandal in Siddipet district in Telangana, India.
