= Cheriyal =

- town
- Location in Telangana, India Cheriyal (India)
- Coordinates: 17°55′35″N 78°58′19″E
- Country: India
- State: Telangana
- District: Siddipet district
- Municipality: Cherial

Languages
  - Official: Telugu
- Time zone: UTC+5:30 (IST)
- Pin code: 506223
- Telephone code: 08710
- Vehicle registration: TS-36
- Website: telangana.gov.in

Cheriyal (or Cherial) is a town and a municipality in Siddipet district, in the center of Telangana state in India.

== Panchayats ==
The following is the list of village panchayats in Cheriyal:

1. Mustiyal
2. Veerannapet
3. Vechareni
4. Kishtampet
5. Dommata
6. Danampally
7. Pothireddypally
8. Gurjakunta
9. Nagapuri
10. Aakunoor
11. Guruvannapeta
12. Komuravelly
13. Kishtampet
14. Gouraya Palli (alternate spellings: Gouraipalli, Gourayapalli)
15. TapasPally
16. Aianapur
17. Kadavergu
18. Rampoor
19. Rasulabad
20. Marrimuchal
21. Chityal

== See also ==
- Cheriyal scroll painting
- Nakashi art
