= Chinna Kodur =

Chinna Kodur Kodur Kodur kurd
- village
- China kodur
- Nickname: Koduru
- Location in Telangana, India Chinna Kodur (India)
- Coordinates: 18.16095°N 78.900955°E
- Country: India
- State: Telangana
- District: Siddipet

Government
  - Type: Surpanch
  - Body: Gram panchayat

Population (2020)
  - Total: 8,000

Languages
  - Official: Telugu
- Time zone: UTC+5:30 (IST)
- Vehicle registration: TS 36
- Vidhan Sabha constituency: Siddipet
- Website: telangana.gov.in

Chinna Kodur is a Mandal headquarters in Siddipet district of Telangana, India. The old name of this village is Kodur kurd. It is situated around 8 km north from siddipet and 2 km north east from Ranganayaka sagar dam (Part of Kaleshwaram project).

The village has four major water ponds: Peddha cheruvu, Brahmanula cheruvu, Bendla kunta and amma kunta.

Chinna kodur is famous for "Sri sherupalli veeranjaneya swamy temple" which is situated 2 km east to the village.

There are 3 banks in Chinnakodur: Union Bank of India, Andhra Pradesh grameena Vikas bank (APGVB), and District co-operative bank (DCCB).

Kothapalli-Manoharabad railway line runs through the area.
