= Panachikkad =

- village
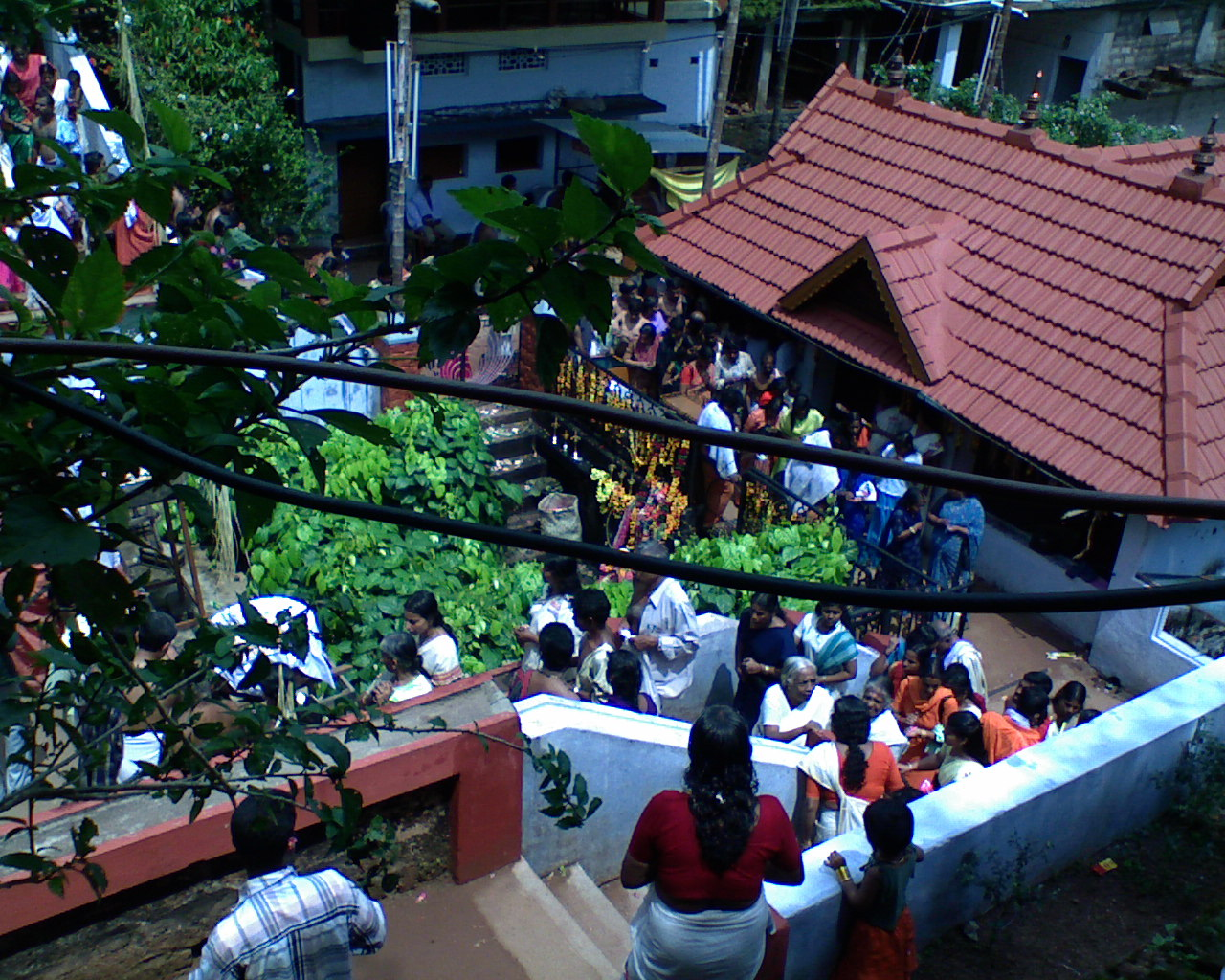
- Dakshina Mookambika
- Interactive map of Panachikkad
- Coordinates: 9°32′12.5″N 76°33′01.4″E
- Country: India
- State: Kerala
- District: Kottayam
- Elevation: 62.49 m (205.0 ft)

Population (2011)
  - Total: 43,595

Languages
  - Official: Malayalam, English
- Time zone: UTC+5:30 (IST)
- PIN: 686533
- Vehicle registration: KL-05

Panachikkad is a small village in Kottayam district in the state of Kerala, India.

== History ==
Before the 11th century, Paruthumpara was in the Velloothurithi Kara of Nattakom.

== Demographics ==
As of 2011 India census, Panachikkad had a population of 43595 with 21370 males and 22225 females.

== Notable sites ==
- Panachikkadu Temple
