= Koheda, Siddipet district =

Koheda
- Village
- Location in Telangana, India Koheda (India)
- Coordinates: 17°17′N 78°38′E
- Country: India
- State: Telangana
- District: Siddipet
- Talukas: Husnabad

Languages
  - Official: Telugu
- Time zone: UTC+5:30 (IST)
- PIN: 505473
- Vehicle registration: TS 36
- Website: telangana.gov.in

Koheda is a village in Koheda mandal of Siddipet district in the state of Telangana in India.
