= Wargal Saraswati Temple =

Hindu temple in Telangana, India

Coordinates: 17°46′34″N 78°36′55″E

- Sri Vidya Saraswati
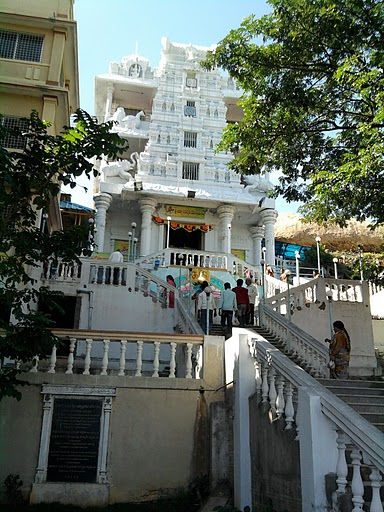
- Wargal Saraswati Temple

Religion
- Affiliation: Hinduism
- District: Siddipet

Location
- State: Telangana
- Country: India
- Interactive map of Wargal Saraswati Temple

Architecture
- Type: South Indian

Wargal Saraswati Temple or Sri Vidya Saraswati Temple is a Hindu temple located in Siddipet district in Telangana, India. The deity of education in Hinduism is Goddess Saraswati. It is among the few temples of Saraswati in Telangana. It is maintained by the Kanchi Shanker Mutt. Construction of the temple complex was due to the efforts of Yayavaram Chandrashekhara Sharma, a scholar and adherent of Goddess Saraswati.

== The Temple ==
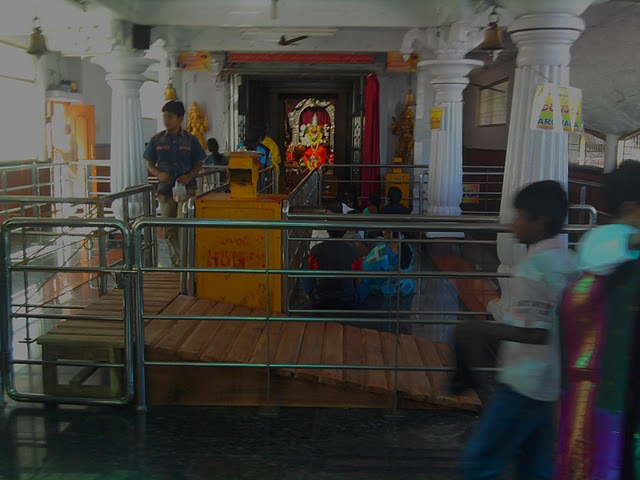
Main Deity

This temple is located on a hillock near Wargal village. On the same hillock are the temples of various other deities, such as:

- Sri Lakshmi Ganapathi Temple
- Sri Vidya Saraswati Temple
- Lord Shanishchara Temple
- Lord Shiva Temple
- A few Vaishnava temples, now completely damaged and without mola vigrahas

Many families visit the temple for their children's akshara abyasam ("learning ceremony"). Meals are provided for free to all devotees at the temple premises, a practice referred to as nitya annadanam.

Vasant Panchami and Sharad Navratri festivals are celebrated at the temple every year. The Navratri mula nakshatram ("birth star of Goddess Saraswati") is the most auspicious day for worshiping Saraswati devi. During this day, special rituals are performed at the temple.

== Veda Paathashala ==
The temple has a Veda paathashaala (a school specializing in the tradition of Vedic recitation) on its premises where many students learn the Vedas.

== See also ==
- List of Hindu temples in India
