= Samarangana Sutradhara =

11th century Indian treatise on architecture

Samarangana Sutradhara (IAST: Samarāṅgaṇasūtradhāra) is an 11th-century poetic treatise on classical Indian architecture (vastu shastra) written in the Sanskrit language attributed to Paramara King Bhoja of Dhar. (Note: Though Bhoja is the attributed author in the colophon, it is unclear if he actually wrote this text. The reasons for doubts are several: (1) Bhoja is the attributed author in the colophons of 33 major Sanskrit texts in diverse subjects; given his political and administrative responsibilities, this is suspect; (2) a philological analysis suggests that the verse style and quality of Sanskrit varies in these texts, as well as within the chapters of Samarāṅgaṇasūtradhāra; this may be because of different authors and the text being a compilation. According to Felix Otter, some of these texts and possibly portions of a few others are likely the work of one author – Bhoja.) The title Samarāṅgaṇasūtradhāra is a compound word that literally means "architect of human dwellings", but can also be decomposed to an alternate meaning as "stage manager for battlefields" – possibly a play of words to recognize its royal author.

Three manuscripts of Samarangana Sutradhara were discovered in early 20th century, while others were found later. They vary somewhat and all survive in an incomplete form. The most complete version is one likely copied and recompiled in the 15th century. This manuscript has 7,430 shlokas (verses) set in 83 adhyayas (chapters). A notable aspect of each adhyaya is that it starts with a verse composed in anustubh meter (chanda in Hindu texts) and ends with a verse in a longer meter, typically upajati or vasantatilaka.

The Samarangana Sutradhara is among the few important texts that have survived on the theory and practice of Hindu temple architecture in the north, central and western Indian subcontinent (chapters 52–67). Its chapters also include discussions on town planning, house architecture, iconography, painting (chitra), and sculpture arts (shilpa). Some chapters include Hindu legends such as of sleeping Vishnu as it explains its ideas, as well as verses on Hindu philosophies such as Samkhya and Vedanta. It includes a discussion of vastu mandalas (chapters 11–15). Others are practical manuals on architecture and construction; for example, house (chapter 37), soil preparation (chapter 8), wood and timber for carpentry (chapter 16), laying bricks (chapter 41) and others. Later chapters (70–83) are dedicated to sculpture and painting. (Note: This is not step by step manual in the modern sense, as are found globally in the contemporary cultural practice, states Mattia Salvini; yet, they are useful guidelines "given in a context and manner" suited to its age.)

The Samarangana Sutradhara acknowledges and builds upon older Indian texts on temple architecture, and vastu in general, states Adam Hardy – a scholar of Hindu temple architecture and related historic texts. It provides one of the most complete list and descriptions of 64 designs of Indian temples as they existed by the 11th century. The text also influenced later Indian treatises such as the 12th-century Aparajitaprccha. The text is significant in its discussion about Nagara, Dravida, Bhumija and other diversified styles of Hindu temples. It is particularly notable for the sections that match with the unfinished 11th-century temple in Bhojpur (Madhya Pradesh) and the earliest known architectural drawings of a Hindu temple engraved on the surrounding rocks.

The Samarangana Sutradhara has a chapter on the art of mechanical contrivances, the yantras (chapter 31). Samarangana Sutradhara includes chapters about the decoration of palaces, which describes the construction of mechanical contrivances (automata), including mechanical bees and birds, fountains shaped like humans and animals, and male and female dolls that refilled oil lamps, danced, played instruments, and re-enacted scenes from Hindu mythology.

It has some visionary verses as well, such as envisioning machines that could fly. However, the author states that he will "not explain how to construct such machines, for the sake of secrecy, and not due to lack of knowledge."

== Editions ==
- Sastri, T.G. (1924)
- Kumar, Pushpendra, Bhoja's Samarangana-Sutradhara : Vastushastra. 2 Vols, New Bharatiya Book Corporation (2004), ISBN 81-87418-92-3.

== Critical studies and translations ==
- Chapters on residential architecture, Felix Otter (2009)
- Chapters on Indian temple architecture, Adam Hardy (2015)
- Sharma, Sudarshan Kumar, Samarangana Sutradhara of Bhojadeva : An Ancient Treatise on Architecture (With an introduction, Sanskrit text, verse by verse English translation, 2 Volumes (2007), ISBN 81-7110-302-2

== See also ==
- Vastu Shastra
