= Jagadevpur, Medak district =

Jagadevpur Jagadevpur Mandal
- Village
- Location in Telangana, India Jagadevpur (India)
- Coordinates: 17.768°N 78.808°E
- Country: India
- State: Telangana
- District: Siddipet district
- Elevation: 568 m (1,864 ft)

Languages
  - Official: Telugu
- Time zone: UTC+5:30 (IST)
- PIN: 502281
- Vehicle registration: TG
- Website: telangana.gov.in

Jagadevpur is a village in the Indian state of Telangana, and a Mandal in Siddipet district.

== Geography ==
Located at 17.768°N 78.808°E, Jagadevpur has an average elevation of 568 metres (1,864 ft). It is the fourth-largest mandal of the Siddipet district. Jagadevpur is 70 km north of Hyderabad and 30 km each from Bhongir and the famous Yadagirigutta (Temple).

There are 28 villages under Jagadevpur mandal:

Sl No	Village Name	Village Code
1	Alirajapet	573658
2	Ananthsagar	573653
3	Angadi Kistapur	573656
4	Baswapur	573650
5	Chatlapalle	573648
6	Cheberthy	573657
7	Chinna Kistapur	573645
8	Dharmaram	573662
9	Doulapur	573670
10	Erravalle	573659
11	Gollapalle	573666
12	Gopalpur	573651
13	Itikyal	573663
14	Jagdevpur	573665
15	Kondapur	573669
16	Munigadapa	573668
17	Peerlapalle	573664
18	Ramachandrapur	573643
19	Rayavaram	573654
20	Sivar Venkatapur	573660
21	Teegul	573655
22	Teegul Narsapur	573647
23	Thimmapur	573652
24	Vardarajpur	573661
25	Venkatapur	573644
26	Venkatapur (Bg)	573667
27	Wattipalle	573649
28	Yellaiguda	573646
