= Cheriyal scroll painting =

Stylized version of Nakashi art made in Hyderabad, India

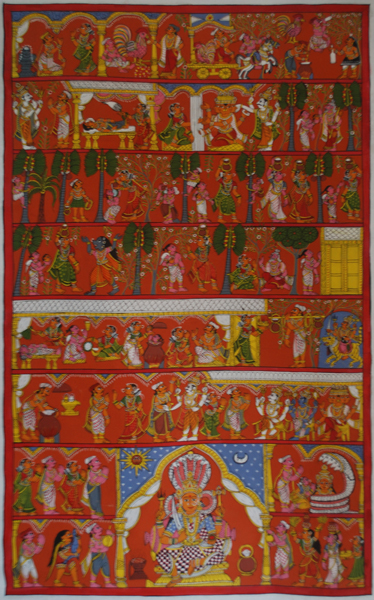
A contemporary Cheriyal Scroll painting

Cheriyal scroll painting is a stylized religious cloth-scroll paintings, rich in the local motifs peculiar to the Telangana. They are at present made only in Hyderabad, Telangana, India. The scrolls are painted in a narrative format, much like a film roll or a comic strip, depicting stories from Indian mythology, and intimately tied to the shorter stories from the Puranas and Epics. Earlier, these paintings were prevalent across Andhra, as also various other parts of the country, albeit flavoured with their distinct styles and other local peculiarities dictated by the local customs and traditions. In the same way, Cheriyal scrolls must have been popular across Telangana in earlier times, though with the advent of television, cinemas and computers it has been fenced into its last outpost, the Cheriyal town. Cheriyal cloth-scroll painting shares common origin with textile scroll paintings like Patachitra and Phad.

== History ==
=== Origins ===
Charanachitras, Mankhas, Yamapatas were ancient form of paintings executed on textile-scrolls and dealt with themes of a narrative-didactive nature of storytelling which finds mentions in Hindu, Jain and Buddhist texts. According to historian A. L. Dallaiccola's in his book South Indian Paintings (2010), earliest known reference to textile-scroll paintings appears in Mahabhashya in 2nd century BC. A.L Dalloiccola notes that these textile scroll paintings were used as a way to teach "the principles ruling their religious and social life through the recitation of stories drawn from the epics, the puranas and other religious texts... In the past, the retelling of these stories provided the education of the unlettered, and the discourses were accompanied by visual aids: scrolls, painted cloth hangings, sets of paintings, and wooden boxes with folding, concertina-like doors painted with scenes". Devotional scrolls were also sold as souvenir paintings for pilgrims, who would bringing back scroll paintings as memento of their pilgrimage.

=== Medieval era ===
The art form has a history of more than 400 years and is closely associated with the storytelling tradition of the region. In India, each region and village developed its own scroll painting traditions, marked by characteristic content, form and technique depending on the local ethos, patronage and socio-economic conditions. Rajasthan is known for its Pabuji ki Pad, Devenarayana katha as also stories from the legend of Dhola and Maru. Goa evolved the Dasavathara, as Maharashtra did Pinguli and the Chitra Katha traditions. Maharashtra and Gujarat are also known for a sophisticated scroll painting tradition called the Prasasti Patra. Orissa and Bengal are famous for their Patachitra traditions.

While the above-mentioned traditions could have significantly influenced the Cheriyal scroll paintings and artists, the Cheriyal paintings were and continue to be a distinctly local invention, peculiar to the Telangana region, drawing mainly on local traditions. It can safely be said that the local temple art traditions and the Kalamkari tradition across Golconda Sultanate in particular, and the graphic art traditions of the Deccan and South India in general were the major influences that shaped and guided the art of scroll paintings. However, it should also be remembered that the sphere of activity, subject and artistic idiom of every scroll painting including that of Cheriyal is peculiar and confined to the village or habitation.

The Mandhets were the itinerant bards and performers of Andhra Pradesh while the Nakashis were the artists. The Nakashis of Telangana also made dolls, much like the Kinnal dolls of Karnataka, in addition to the painted scrolls. These scrolls were a very important part of the sociological and cultural setting of Telangana. As these paintings are now confined to Cheriyal village, they are called Cheriyal scrolls. In earlier times, the scrolls were a colourful backdrop to the equally interesting oral traditions of the common people, - the village hajjam-barber, toddy tapper, dhobhi-washerman, chamar-leatherworker, fisherman, weaver and farmer: (Madiga, Goud, Mudiraju, Malas, Padmashali, Chakala and Mangali) the seven working and marginalised castes and communities of the village. The scrolls set out the adventures and exploits of local folk heroes who performed on the fringes of the epics, Puranas, etc. of the Hindu 'Greater Tradition'. Each community had its peculiarities and its favourite heroes and heroines as also selection of stories from local Mythologies. It was also customary to sacrifice a goat after the recitation of the story from the scroll in some communities.

== Present times ==
Today the long stories from the local mythologies have been cut short, as the traditional patrons for the long scrolls no longer exist. The artists have been forced to adapt and nowadays they paint smaller versions of the scrolls, depicting a single episode or character from the traditional stories. These are amenable to framing and can be hung on walls in modern homes. Further, the colours are no longer prepared in the traditional manner. While earlier, they used natural white extracted from sea shells, black from lamp soot and yellow from turmeric.

== The Tradition ==
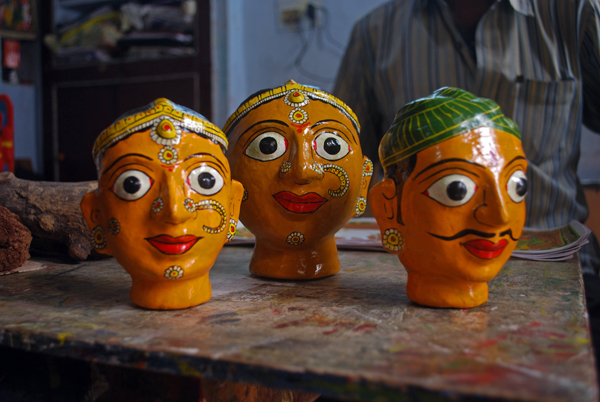
Contemporary Cheriyal Dolls

The traditional art form became an inseparable part of the profession of the story-telling, balladeer community known as Kaki Padagollu. They displayed the scrolls and accompanied by music and dance went from village to village narrating and singing their ballads based from their rich folklore which was rooted in the Puranas and Indian Epics, enlivening many a lazy village evening.

In a typical recitation, the storyteller-balladeer would wander from village to village in a team of usually five people, with two to narrate the story while the others would provide a simple but hectic musical accompaniment with the harmonium, tabala and castanets. The stage would also be a simple affair (many times even to the extent of being a rough and ready fixture), erected on four poles with a horizontal bar on which the scrolls could be displayed.

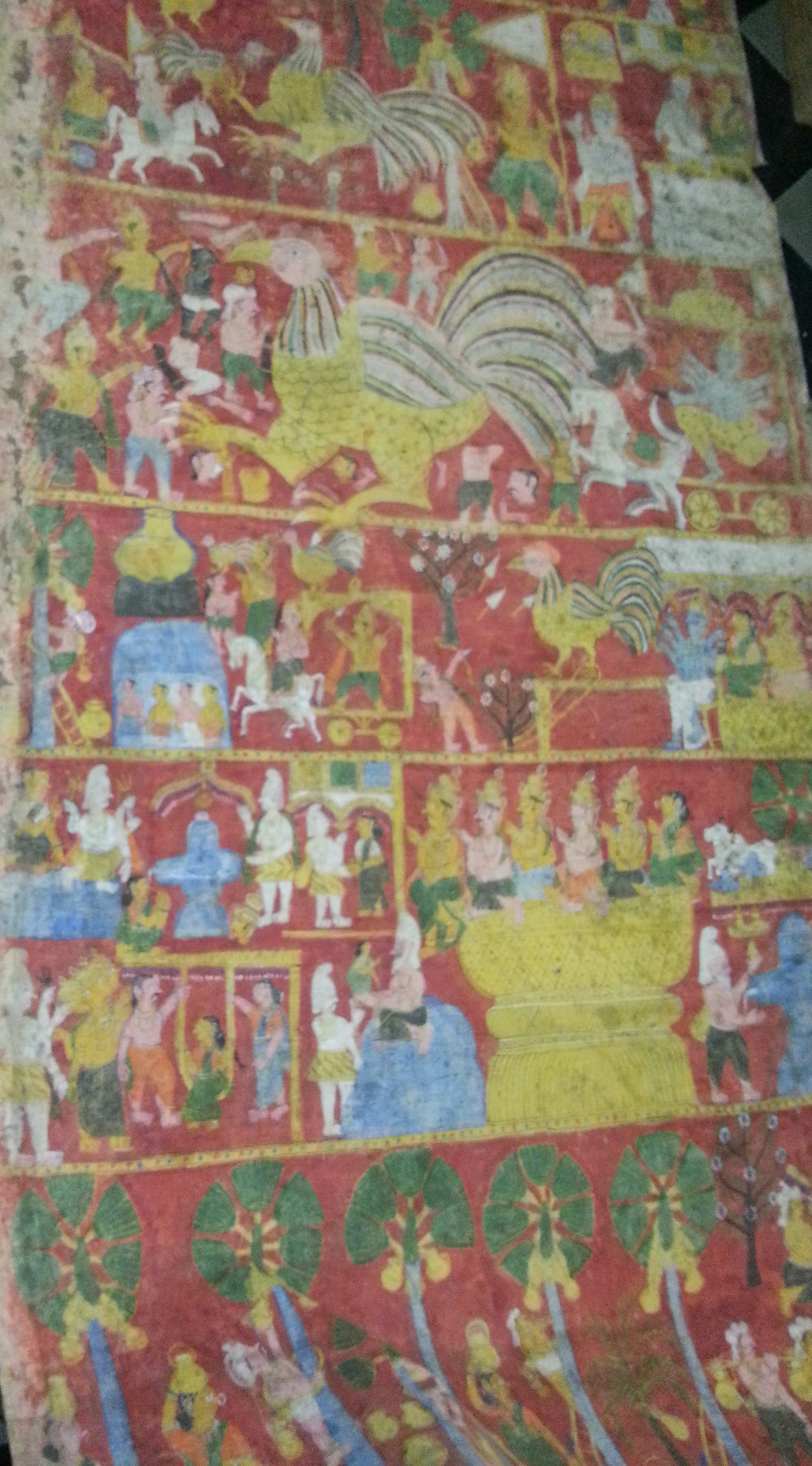
A traditional Cheriyal scroll painting depicting the legends of the toddy tapper community. Circa 18th - 19th century.

The scroll would flow like a film roll. It was generally about three feet in width and went up to 40 – 45 feet in length, depending upon the story. The traditional scrolls are normally in vertical format, illustrating stories in a series of horizontal panels. A floral border in the middle separates the two panels, while the linear narrative is demonstrated by holding in both hands or suspending it from a tree or a building and continually rolling it. Like large sized comic strips, each panel of the scroll depicted one part of the story. Hence, a scroll would easily have around 50 panels. As the bard would narrate the story, the panel depicting that particular part of the story would be displayed. The choice of episodes and iconography of each deity was painted, keeping in mind the caste for which the scroll was made.

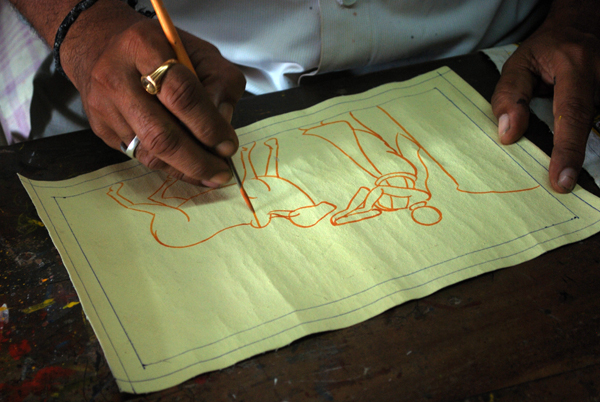
A modern Cheriyal painting in making

By virtue of its distinct traditional style and characteristics Cheriyal Paintings were recently given a Geographical Indications (GI) tag. There are very few artists remaining who continue to paint using this unique technique. A recent innovation has been the painting of single pictures (as opposed to a continuous scroll) meant for wall decorations.

== Process ==
The making of the canvas is a very elaborate procedure. The Khadi cotton is treated with a mixture of starch (from rice), suddha matti (white mud), a paste of boiled tamarind seeds and gum water thrice. It has to be ensured that every coating is thoroughly dried before the next one is applied. Once the canvas is ready, the artists sketch the outline directly onto the canvas using a brush. The outlines are very well defined and sharply reflecting the quality and experience of the craftsman. The colors are made by the artists from natural sources. Brushes are made with hair of squirrels tied to a stick. Dolls and masks are made of wood, saw dust and tamarind paste. Masks are made even with coconut shells.

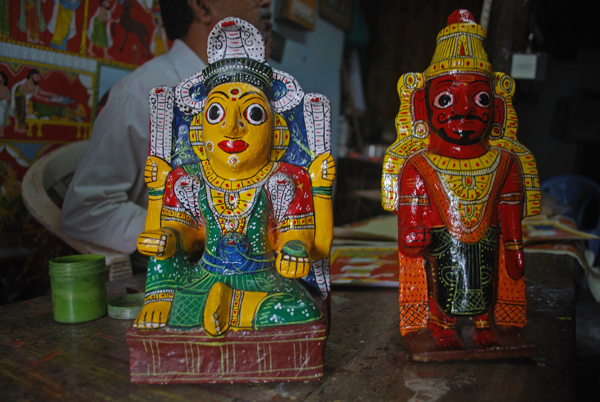
Contemporary Cheriyal Dolls

== Characteristics ==
Cheriyal Paintings can be easily recognised by the following peculiarities and unique characteristics:

• Painted in vivid hues, mostly primary colors, with a predominance of red in the background, the paintings are characterised by the unbridled imagination of the local artisans who were not constrained by the academic rigour that characterised the more classical Tanjore painting and Mysore painting. For example, the artist hardly bothers about perspective in Cheriyal paintings and sets out the narrative by placing the relevant figures in appropriate order and position in the relevant background. The iconography of even the major deities like Shiva, Vishnu, etc. has a strong local idiom.

•The subjects of these scroll paintings are easy to relate to – as the themes and stories are familiar – drawn from ancient literary, mythological and folk traditions. The common themes are from the Krishna Leela, Ramayana, Mahabharata, Shiva Puranam, Markandeya Puranam interspersed with the ballads and folk-stories of communities like Gauda, Madiga and so on.

• The main narrative is spiced up with scenes from simple rural life - Women doing chores in the kitchen, men working in the paddy fields or boozing away in merry abandon, festival scenes, etc. are endearingly depicted.

• The costumes and settings in which the figures are depicted are typical and reflect the culture of Andhra, where these paintings originated.

• Within the narrow panels, proportion is created by depicting trees, or a building, a pillar with drawn curtains, etc. However more often than not, the proportion of individual characters is determined by their relative importance in that particular scene, with the most important character being the largest and most detailed and the lesser characters being smaller and less detailed.

== GI rights ==
Cheriyal scroll painting received Intellectual Property Rights Protection or Geographical Indication (GI) status in 2008.

== Bibliography ==
- British Museum; Anna Libera Dallapiccola (2010). South Indian Paintings: A Catalogue of the British Museum Collection. Mapin Publishing Pvt Ltd. ISBN 978-0-7141-2424-7.
