= Jagdeo, Pakistan =

Jagday
- Jagday
- Location within Pakistan
- Coordinates: 31.07°N 72.50°E
- Country: Pakistan
- Province: Punjab
- Elevation: 168 m (551 ft)
- Time zone: UTC+5 (PST)
- Calling code: 0413

Jagdeo, or Jagday, is a village in Samundri Tehsil in Faisalabad District in the Punjab province of Pakistan. It has an altitude of 168 metres (551 ft). It is the part of union council no.120 of Tehsil Sammundri. It has a population of over 8,000.
