= Bejjanki =

- Village
- Location in Telangana, India Bejjanki (India)
- Coordinates: 18.255562°N 79.016474°E
- Country: India
- State: Telangana
- District: Siddipet
- Talukas: Bejjanki

Languages
  - Official: Telugu
- Time zone: UTC+5:30 (IST)
- PIN: 505528
- Telephone code: 878
- Vehicle registration: TG 36
- Website: telangana.gov.in

Bejjanki is a mandal in Siddipet district of the Indian state of Telangana. It consists of 25 villages.

== History ==
Bejjanki is a mandal in the newly formed district of Siddipet. It was previously part of Karimnagar district. Bejjanki was divided into two separate mandals during the formation of new districts in 2016.

== Festivals and Culture ==
Bejjanki Jathara and Dassara are the major festivals celebrated in Bejjanki. Other festivals celebrated are Bonalu, Ugadi, Bathukamma, Deepavali, Sankranti, Shivarathri and Holi. Bejjanki Jathara is one of the biggest fairs in Siddipet and Karimnagar districts. Bejjanki Jathara comes on the very first pournami of the Telugu calendar which is Chaitra Pournami.

== Geography ==
Bejjanki is the largest village in the mandal with a population of over 8,000. Villages surrounding Bejjanki are Chilapur, Gundaram, Papannapalli, Ellampalli, Thimmaiahpally.

== Politics ==
Bejjanki mandal is part of Manakondur assembly constituency and Karimnagar Lok Sabha constituency. TRS candidate Rasamai Balakishan has won the 2018 Assembly elections from Manakondur constituency for the second consecutive time. Bahujan Samaj Party is one of the major parties in Bejjanki Mandal.

== Education ==
The Government Junior College, Government Boys High School, Government Girls High School, and Telangana State Model School are schools for the rural people of Bejjanki mandal. Private schools and colleges are also available.

== Transport ==
Bejjanki is well connected with roads. A 5 km road from Bejjanki Gram Panchayat office connects to Rajiv Rahadari. Buses are available from Karimnagar, Siddipet, HUSNABAD TOWN and Vemulawada. Karimnagar bus depot 1 runs city buses to Bejjanki everyday and also few other bus services to other villages via Bejjanki. A bus runs daily between Karimnagar and Secunderabad via Bejjanki which connects the village with the state capital.

Auto rickshaws are also available for the people in Bejjanki to reach shorter destinations quickly.

== Sports ==
Cricket is the most popular sport in Bejjanki, though sports such as Volleyball, Badminton, and Kabaddi are also enjoyed by the younger people. A cricket tournament is conducted in January by Bejjanki youth association.
