= Siddipet district =

- District of Telangana
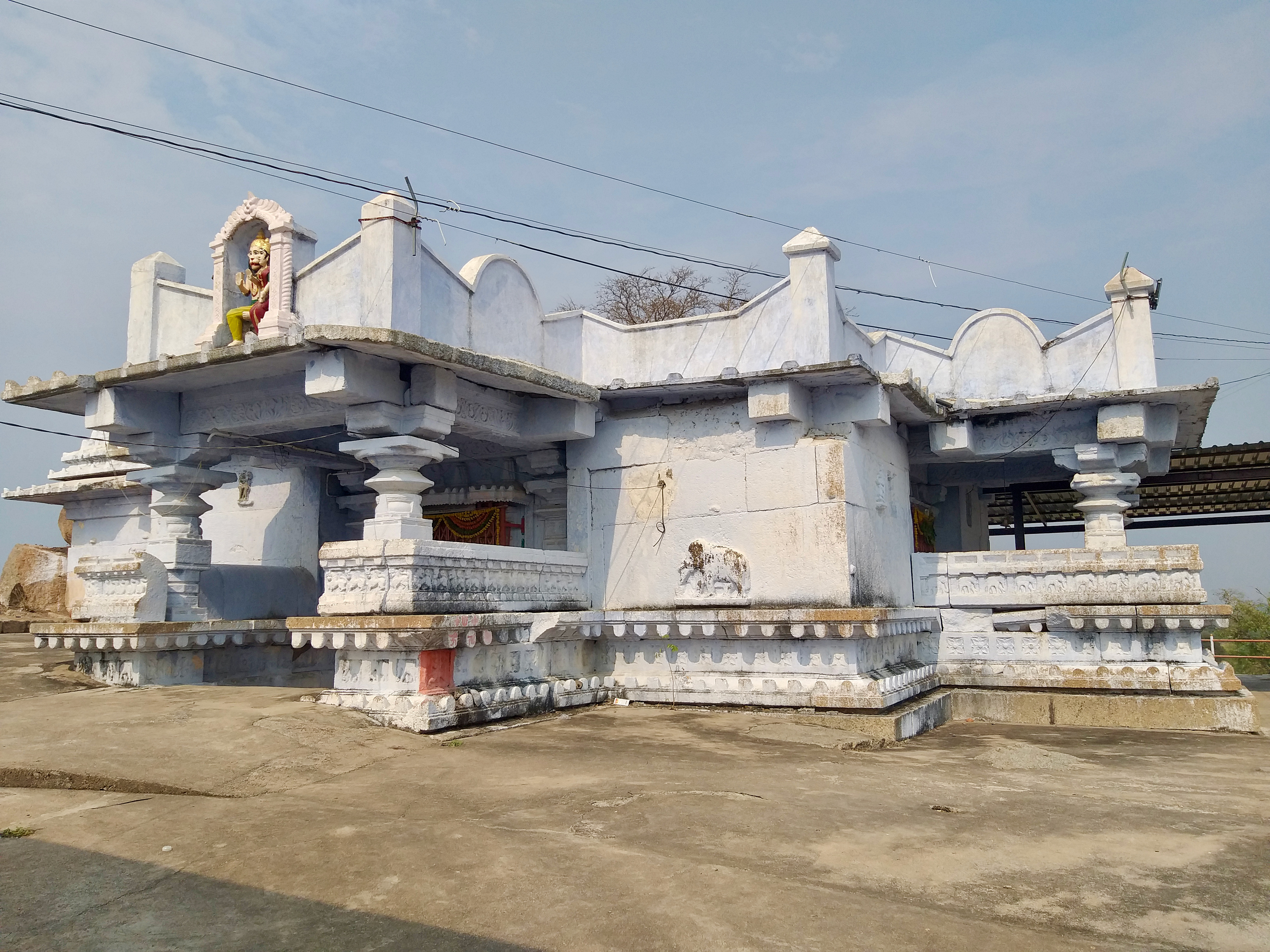
- Lakshmi Narasimha Temple, Bejjanki

- Location in Telangana
- Siddipet district
- Country: India
- State: Telangana
- Formation: 11 October 2016
- Headquarters: Siddipet
- Mandalas: 26

Government
  - District collector: Smt. K.Hymavathi, IAS
  - Member of Legislative Assembly: T. Harish Rao, BRS

Area
  - Total: 3,842.33 km^{2} (1,483.53 sq mi)

Population (2011)
  - Total: 1,012,065
  - Density: 263.399/km^{2} (682.200/sq mi)
- Time zone: UTC+05:30 (IST)
- Vehicle registration: TG 36
- Nominal GDP (2022-23): ₹28,029.91 crore (equivalent to ₹310 billion or US$3.2 billion in 2026)
- Per Capita Income ( 2022-23 ): ₹235,218 (US$2,400)
- Website: siddipet.telangana.gov.in

Siddipet district is a district in the Indian state of Telangana. Its headquarters is Siddipet. This district contains a part of the Hyderabad Metropolitan Region (Markook Mulugu Wargal) Siddipet district is located in central part of the state. The district shares boundaries with Jangaon, Sircilla, Karimnagar, Kamareddy, Hanamkonda, Yadadri, Medhchal and Medak districts.

== Geography ==
This district is bounded by Rajanna Sircilla district in the north, Karimnagar district in the northeast, Jangaon district in the east, Yadadri Bhuvanagiri district in the south, Medchal district in the southwest, Medak district in the west and Kamareddy district in the northwest.

== Demographics ==
Religion in Siddipet district (2011)
Hinduism	93.44%
Islam	5.49%
Christianity	0.65%
Other or not stated	0.42%

At the time of the 2011 census, Siddipet district has a population of 1,012,065. Siddipet has a sex ratio of 1008 females per 1000 males and a literacy rate of 61.61%. 103,852 (10.26%) were under 6 years of age. 139,052 (13.74%) lived in urban areas. Scheduled Castes and Scheduled Tribes made up 187,508 (18.53%) and 25,010 (2.47%) of the population respectively.

Languages of Siddipet district (2011)
1. Telugu (92.5%)
2. Urdu (5.09%)
3. Lambadi (1.57%)
4. Others (0.84%)

At the time of the 2011 census, 92.50% of the population spoke Telugu, 5.09% Urdu and 1.57% Lambadi as their first language.

== District administration ==
The collector of Siddipet district is Prasanth Jeevan Patil, appointed on 16 November 2021, succeeding P. Venkatrami Reddy, who submitted his resignation to join politics.

== Administrative divisions ==
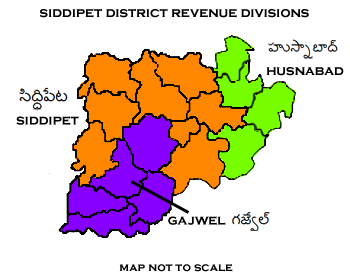
Siddipet District revenue divisions

The district will have three revenue divisions of Gajwel, Siddipet and Husnabad. Venkatarama Reddy is the present collector of the district.

Siddipet Revenue Division	Gajwel Revenue Division	Husnabad Revenue Division
Siddipet(Urban)	Gajwel	Husnabad
Siddipet(Rural)	Wargal	Maddur
Chinnakodur	Mulugu	Akkannapet
Nangnoor	Jagadevpur	Koheda
Dubbak	Markook	Bejjanki
Doulthabad	Kondapak	Dhoolmitta
Mirdoddi	Raipole	
Thoguta	Kukunoorpally	
Komuravelli		
Cheriyal		
Narayanaraopet		
Akbarpet-Bhoompally		

== Notable sites ==
- Sri Vidya Saraswathi Shani Temples, Wargal
- Sri Bugga Rajeshwara Swami temple Narayanraopet mandal headquarters
- Sri Lakshmi Narasimha Swamy Temple, Nacharam
- Mallanna Swamy Temple, Komuravelli
- Konda pochamma temple, Tigul Narsapur
- Koti Lingeshwara Temple, Siddipet
- Sri Saraswathi Kshetramu Main Temple, Regulapalli
- Sri Lakshmi Narasimha Swamy temple, Bejjanki
- Komati Cheruvu Tankbund, Siddipet
- Ainapur Lake, Telangana
- Komuravelli Mallanna Sagar Reservoir
- Sri Ranganayaka Sagar Reservoir
- Shanigaram Cheruvu, Telangana
- Annapurna Reservoir
- Konda Pochamma Sagar Reservoir, Markook

== See also ==
- List of districts in Telangana
