= Mounagiri Hanuman Temple =

Mounagiri
- Mounagiri Hanuman Temple
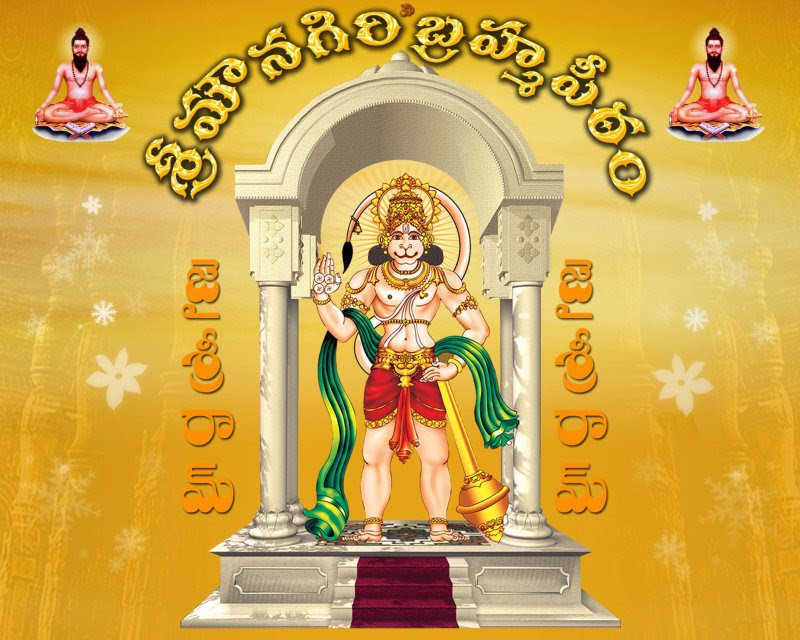

Religion
- Affiliation: Hinduism
- Deity: Hanuman
- Festivals: Hanuman Jayanthi, Sri Ramanavami

Location
- Location: Anantapur district, Andhra Pradesh
- Country: India
- Interactive map of Mounagiri
- Coordinates: 14°36′50.35″N 77°16′39.73″E

Architecture
- Type: Vastu Shastra and Pancharatra Shastra
- Creator: Sri Eswaraiah Swamy
- Completed: 6 November 2010 (consecration)

Website
- http://www.mounagiri.com

Mounagiri (Telugu: మౌనగిరి అభయ ఆంజనేయ స్వామి, Devnagari: मौनागिरी अभय हनुमान मंदिर ) is a Hindu temple near Bengaluru Highway in Anantapur, India. The temple displays millennia of traditional Hindu and Andhra culture, spirituality, and architecture. The temple was inspired and developed by Sri Eswaraiah Swamy, the spiritual head of the Mounagiri Global Trust and Philosophical Society, whose 500 volunteers helped 1,000 artisans construct the Mounagiri Hanuman Temple. The Hanuman idol cost around ₹90 lakh (US$93,000) to sculpture.

== Features ==
=== Monument ===
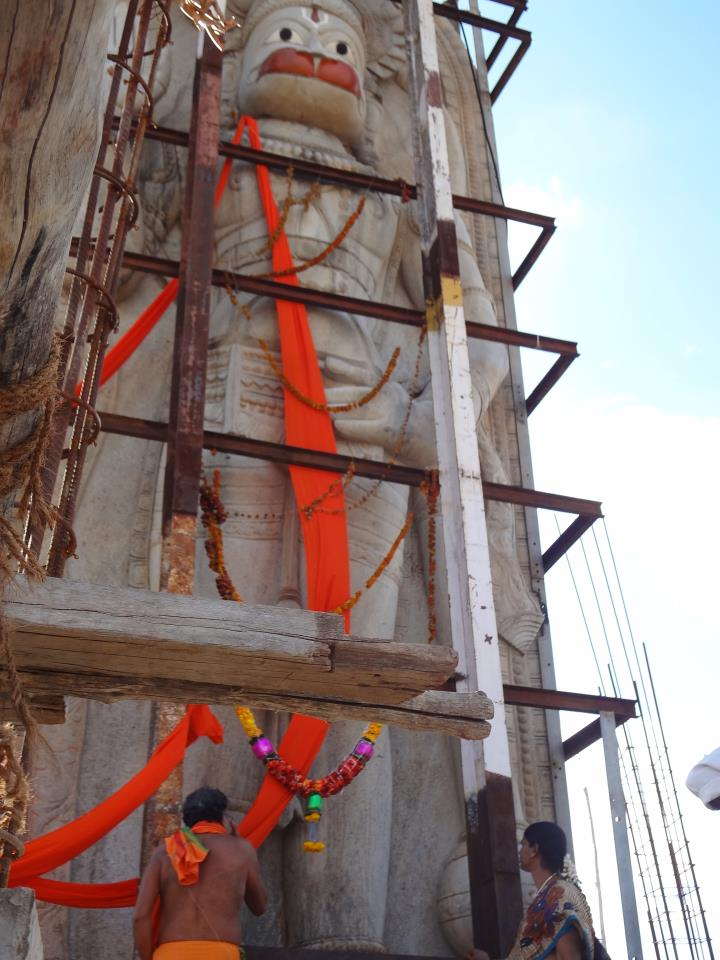
The central monument at Mounagiri

The main monument, at the center of the temple, is 39 feet (12 m) high, made from a single stone. The temple is located in a peaceful environment outside the city without any disturbances occurring. The temple construction work is still in process, and is going very slowly due to the financial problems, and looking for donors to finish the construction of the temple.

== Location and contact information ==
The temple is located in Hampapuram Village, Bengaluru highway (NH 44), Ananthapuramu district (formerly Anantapur), Andhra Pradesh, 7.4 km from Rapthadu Mandal. Buses are available from all places in Andhra Pradesh and Telangana, Bengaluru, and Chennai to reach this temple.

The nearest railway station is Anantapur, 12.6 km away. Buses and private taxis are available while the nearest airport is Sri Sathya Sai Airport in Puttaparthi, 71 km away from the temple.

== Gallery ==
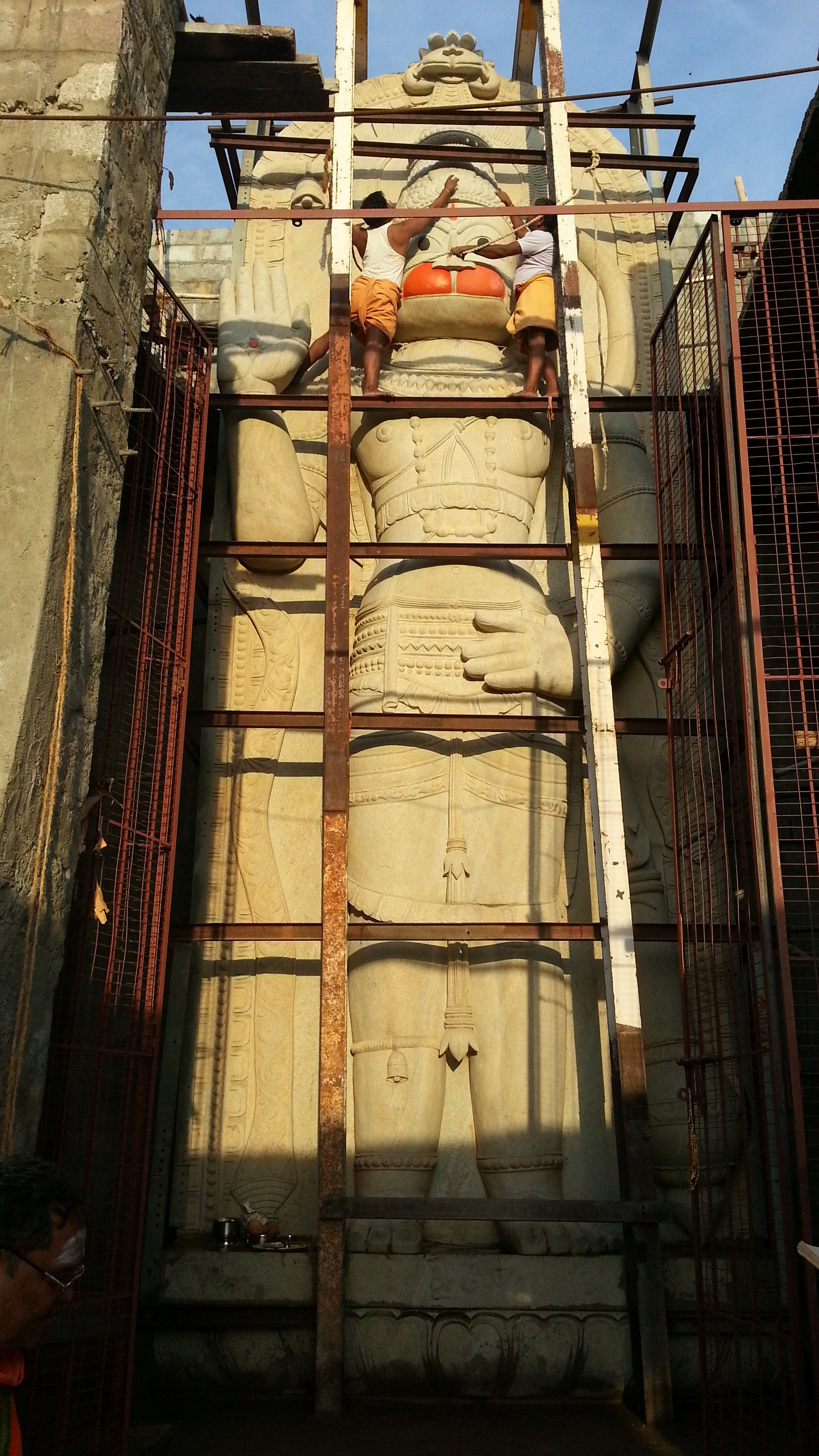
Main Monument of Lord Hanuman main statue at Mounagiri

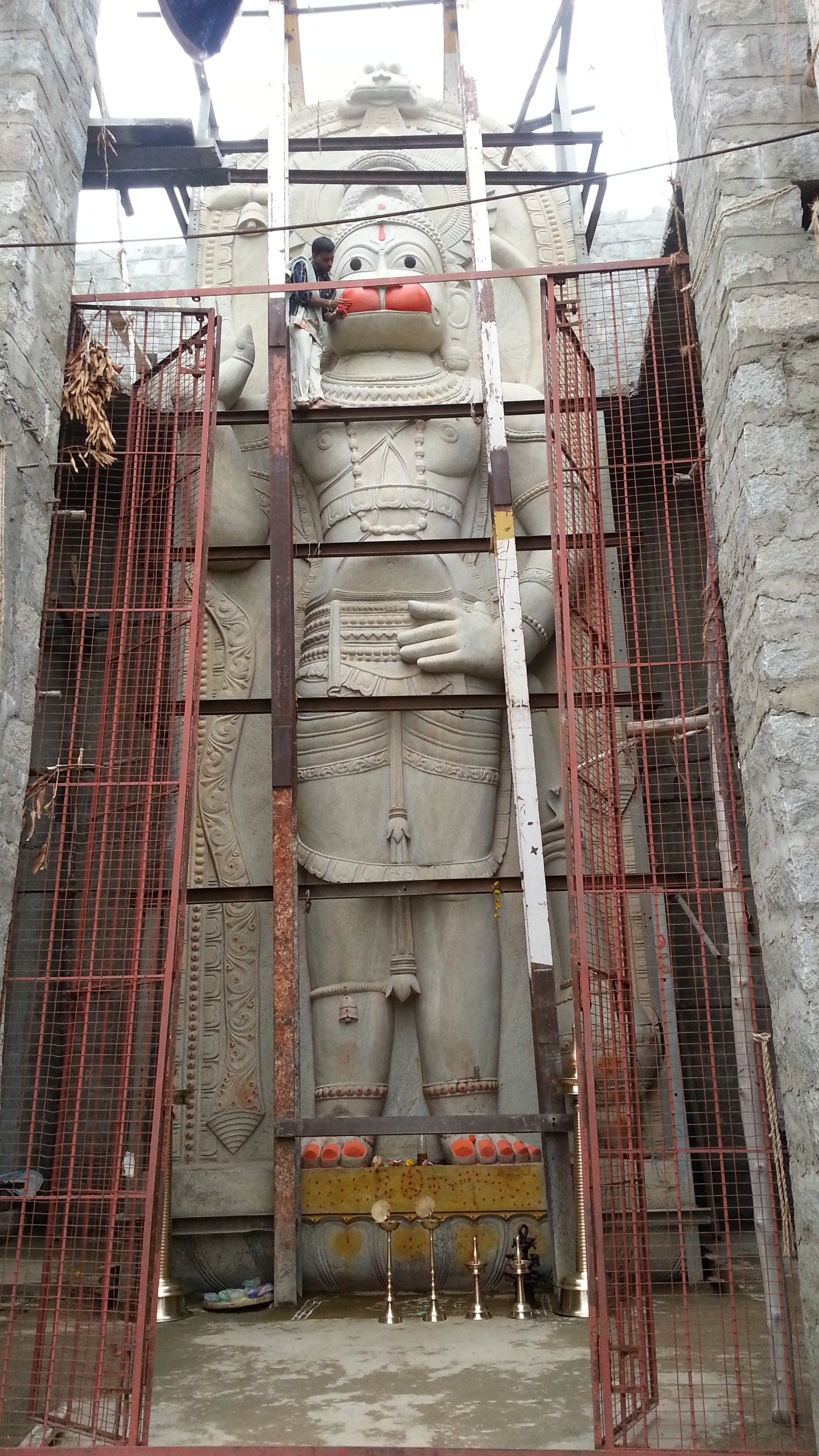
Abhaya Hanuman at Mounagiri

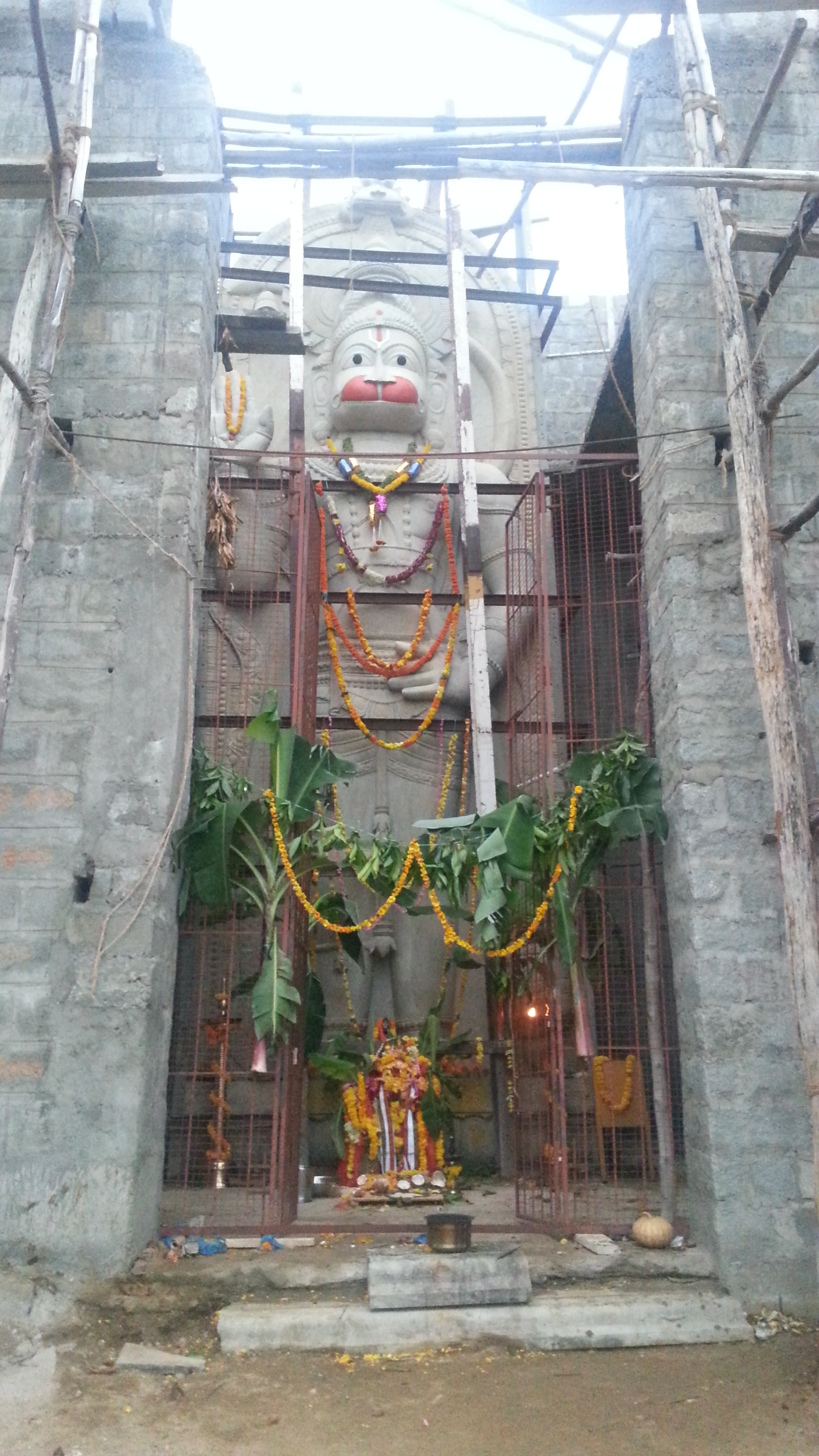
Sankata Mochana Hanuman at Mounagiri, Ananthapur
