= Maya Samhita =

Maya Samhita (Sanskrit:मय संहिता,Mayasaṁhitā) is a treatise on Hindu Shilpa Shastras. A certain Maya is said to have written this book along with Hora Shastra.

== See also ==
- Mamuni Mayan
