= Vidyadhar Bhattacharya =

Indian Architect (1693-1751)

- Born: 1693; Naihati, Bengal, India
- Died: 1751 (aged 57–58)
- Occupations: architect, auditor, minister
- Buildings: City Palace, Jaipur
- Projects: Jaipur, City Palace, Jaipur

Vidyadhar Bhattacharya (Bengali: বিদ্যাধর ভট্টাচার্য; 1693–1751) was the chief architect and city planner of Jaipur, Rajputana. He was a Gaur Brahmin from Naihati (in present-day West Bengal), and was already working in the Amber state as Junior Auditor when approached by Maharaja Sawai Jai Singh II in 1727 to build one of the earliest planned cities of India. City Palace, a newer addition to palace complex, was designed by Sir Samuel Swinton Jacob. He used principles of Shilpa Shastra and Vaastu Shastra to create a grid-based model of city.

== Vidyadhar Garden ==
The Vidyadhar Garden, located at Ghat ki Guni, near Galtaji, was built in memory of Purohit Vidyadhar Bhattacharya. Built in 1988, the garden was designed based on "Shilpa Shastra", the ancient book on Indian architecture that Vidyadhar Bhattacharya referred to while designing the pink city of Jaipur. Before the garden was built, the area, situated close to the Sisodia Garden, was believed to be a vineyard.

The place is managed by the government of Rajasthan and was used to host private get-togethers, but now it is banned by the government of Rajasthan.
