= Jawahar Kala Kendra =

Coordinates: 26.8762°N 75.8091°E

- जवाहर कला केंद्र
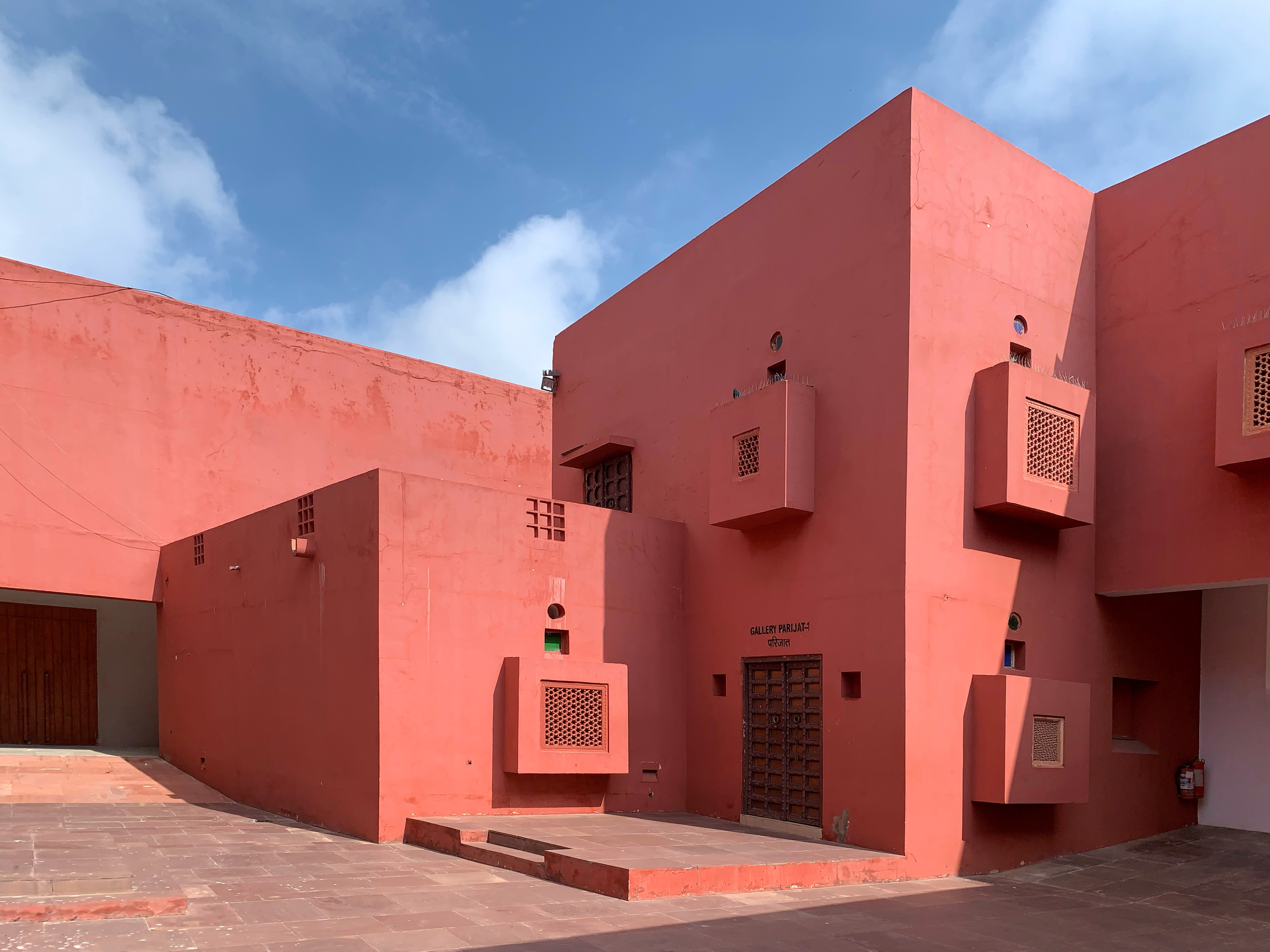
- The Jawahar Kala Kendra, designed by Charles Correa, in Jaipur, Rajasthan

- Location within Jaipur Location within Rajasthan

General information
- Location: 2, Jawahar Lal Nehru Marg, Opposite Opp Commerce College, Jhalana Doongri, Jaipur, Rajasthan 302004, India, Jaipur, India
- Construction started: 1986; 40 years ago
- Completed: 1992; 34 years ago
- Owner: Government of Rajasthan

Design and construction
- Architect: Charles Correa

The Jawahar Kala Kendra (JKK) is a multi-arts center located in the city of Jaipur, India. It was built by the Government of Rajasthan to preserve Rajasthani arts and crafts. The center has eight blocks housing museums, an amphitheater, an auditorium, a library, art display rooms, a cafeteria, a small hostel, and an art studio. It also houses two permanent art galleries and three others, and it hosts its yearly theatre festival.

== Architecture ==
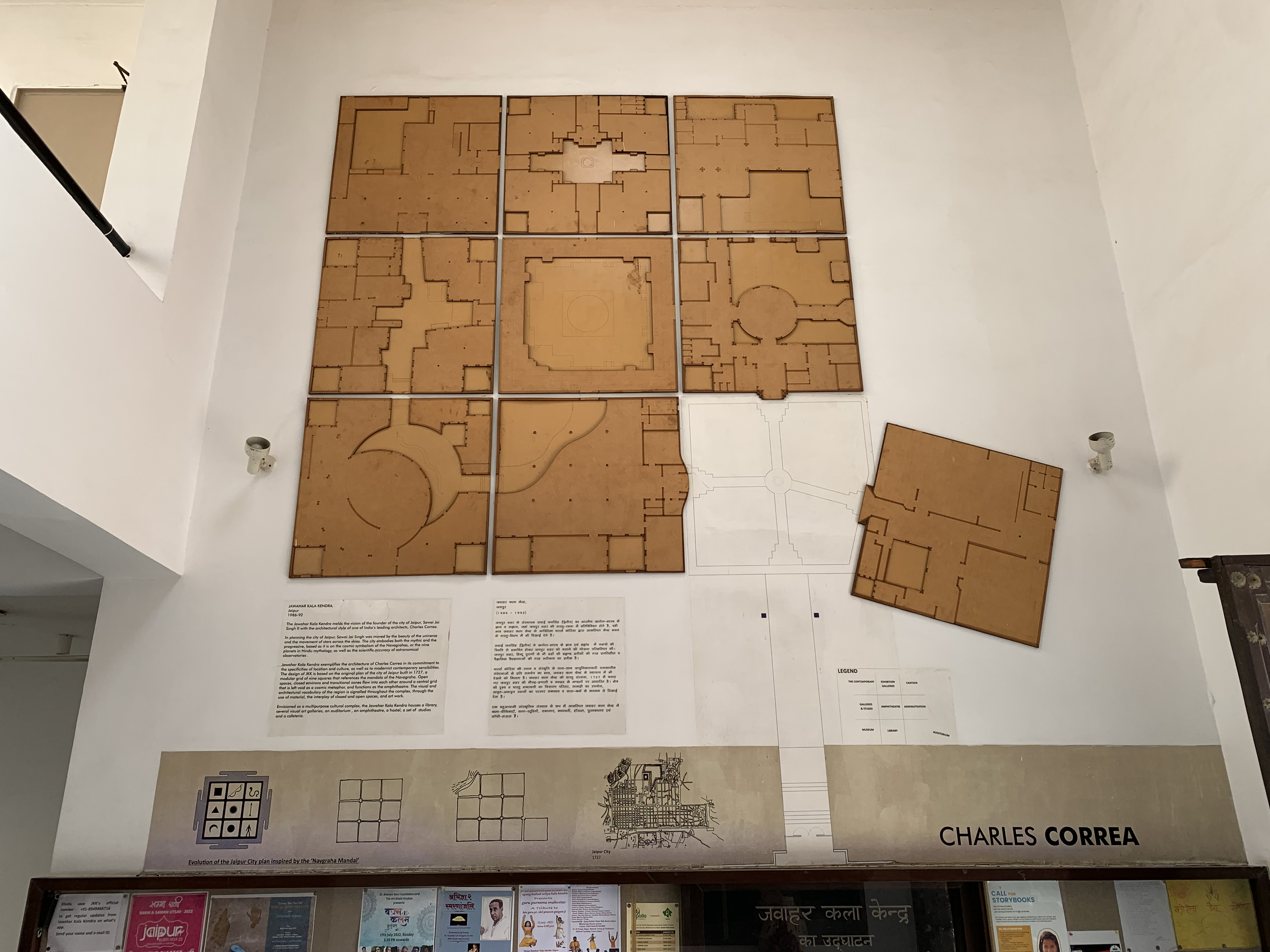
Vastu shastra-inspired plan adapted and evolved by modern architect Charles Correa in the design of Jawahar Kala Kendra, Jaipur, Rajasthan.

Jawahar Kala Kendra was built to resemble a red fort, with no windows on its facade. The design was prepared by the architect Charles Correa in 1986 and the building was ready in 1992. The plan is inspired by the original city plan of Jaipur, consisting of nine squares with a central square left open. The Jawahar Kala Kendra adapts and applies concepts from ancient architectural principles called the Vastu Vidya.

The architecture of Jawahar Kala Kendra follows the Indian classical principle Vastu Purush Mandala. In this style, the plan of the building is conceived as a model of the Cosmos. The specific mandala invoked in Jawahar Kala Kendra is the Navagraha. The plan consists of nine squares, each representing a planet, including two imaginary ones, Rahu and Ketu.

The centre is an analogue of the original city plan of Jaipur, drawn up by Maharaja Jai Singh II, a scholar, mathematician, and astronomer, in the mid-17th century. His city plan, guided by the Shilpa Shastras, was based on the ancient Vedic mandala. Due to the presence of a hill, one of the squares was transposed to the east, and two squares were amalgamated to house the palace. Maharaja Jai Singh had one of the squares moved due to the presence of a hill in his design of the Jaipur city plan. Correa invoked the original mandala while innovatively using one square as the main entrance.

Correa's plan for the Kendra directly invokes the original navagraha or nine house mandala. One of the squares is pivoted to recall the original city plan and create the entrance. The plan of Jaipur city is based on the nine square Yantra in which one square is displaced, and two central squares are combined. The squares are defined by an 8-meter-high wall, symbolizing the fortification wall along the old city of Jaipur.

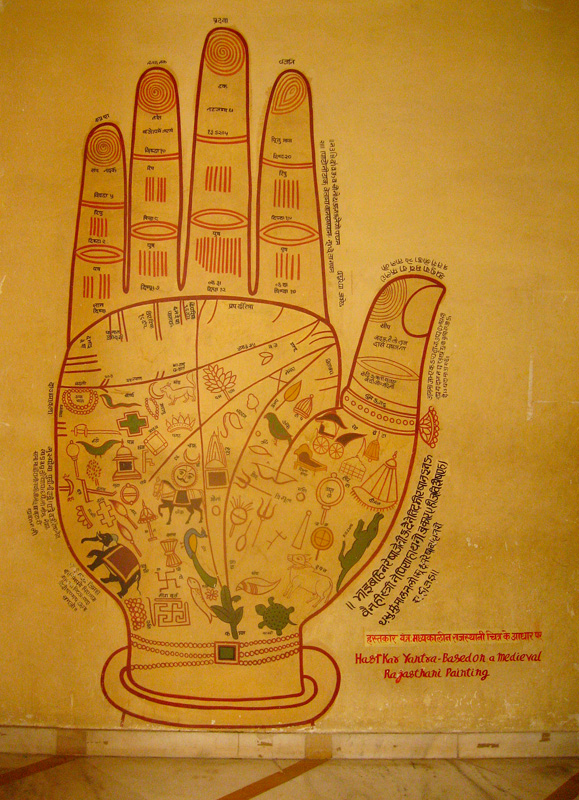
Hastakar Yantra, Jawahar Kala Kendra

The idea was to create a cultural complex imbued with an intrinsic local context and historical ambience. Crossing the lush garden, one foray into a series of open-air pavilions as one enters the courtyard. Archways lead to painted domes, amphitheaters, cafés, and art galleries that all seemed spatially aligned as if enveloping the structure. There is a mural of a palm reading at the entrance to the theatre which illustrates the association of astrology and astronomy by naming the planets on the mounds of the hand. Ancient traditions, Medieval Mughal aesthetics, and contemporary and evolving artistic sensibilities find representation in Jawahar Kala Kendra in its architecture, design, and activities.

== Theatre, Museum and Activities ==
Rangayan, Mihir, Open Theatre, are a few of the many theatres housed in JKK. The building has eight squares and one main entrance. Each square is assigned to one planet in the plan and design. The square assigned to planet Brihaspati houses the library; planet Mangala houses the administrative offices; planet Budha houses the museum, which boasts a collection of miniature paintings, jewellery, photographs, musical instruments, and other cultural artifacts. Ketu houses other museum objects, among which an ornate antique carriage is prized.

Traditional wooden statues of Rajasthani crafts and traditional terracotta wall panels are also exhibited. Planet Shukra houses the theatres, while planet Shani houses the art galleries, such as Sukriti, Surekh, Parijat, Chaturdik, etc. Rahu is the square that facilitates documentation and research. The central square is dedicated to the Surya, just as the sun is the centre of the universe. It also serves as an open-air theatre called ‘Madhyavati.’ The astrological symbol of each planet is illustrated in a mural on the adjoining wall of each corresponding section. The ground plan includes two museums, a folk art centre, a studio, a closed theatre known as ‘Rangayan,’ and an open-air theatre known as ‘Madhyavati.’

At Jawahar Kala Kendra, many local traditional folk theatres like Khayals, Rammats, and Tamashas are performed. Lok Rang, the national folk festival, is also held here annually. Its library houses 20,000 books on Art, Architecture, Culture, Sculpture, Music, Drama, and other related subjects. Monographs on studies of various art forms such as Ghumar, Kanhaiya, and Dhrupad have been published, along with a major publication on Wall Paintings of Rajasthan, Treasures of Albert Hall Museum, Abhaneri, etc. Summer schools for dance, theatre, music, painting, etc., are regularly conducted to train children. Renowned artists are invited for residency programs.

== Gallery ==
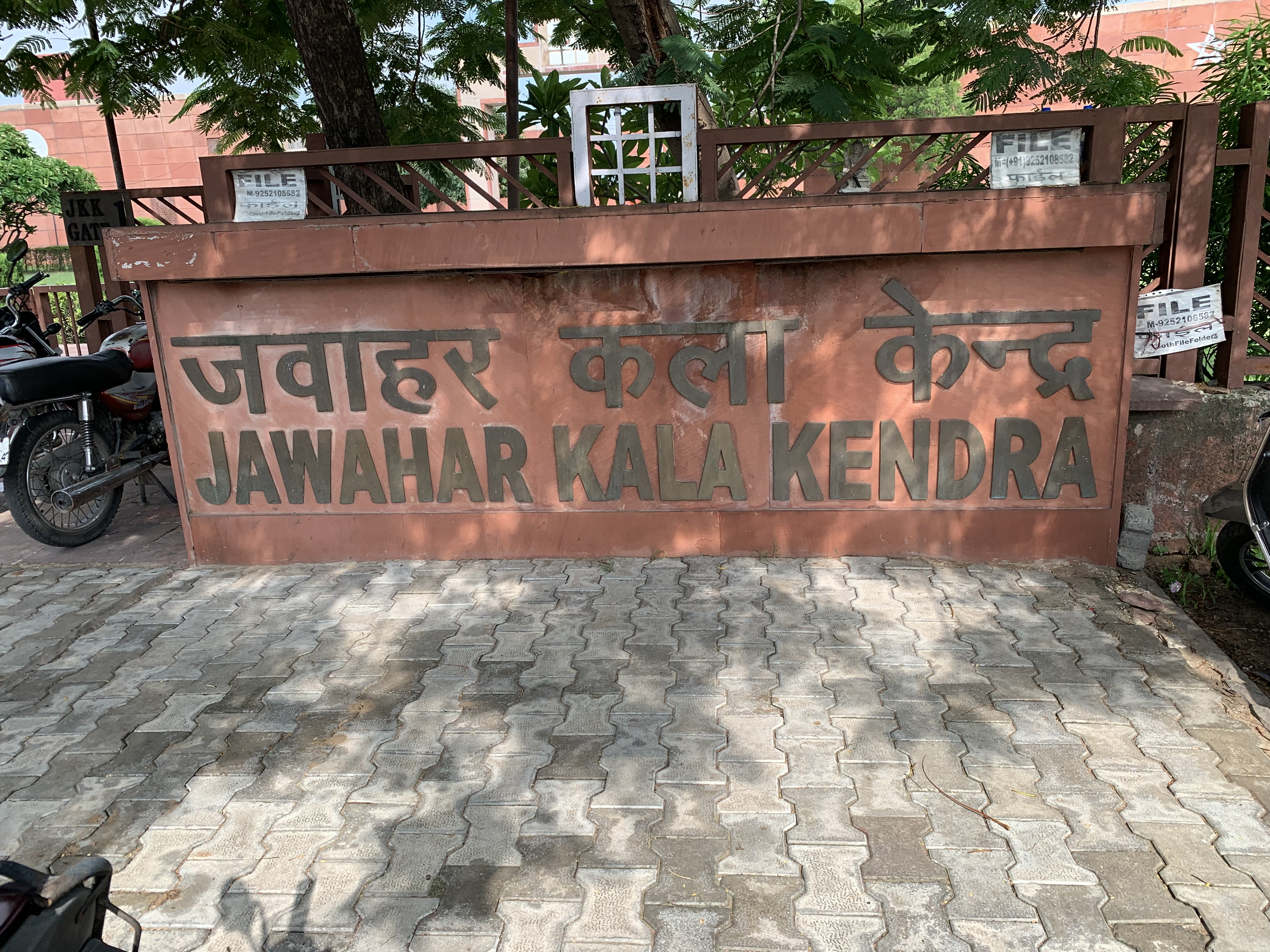
Sign at the entry

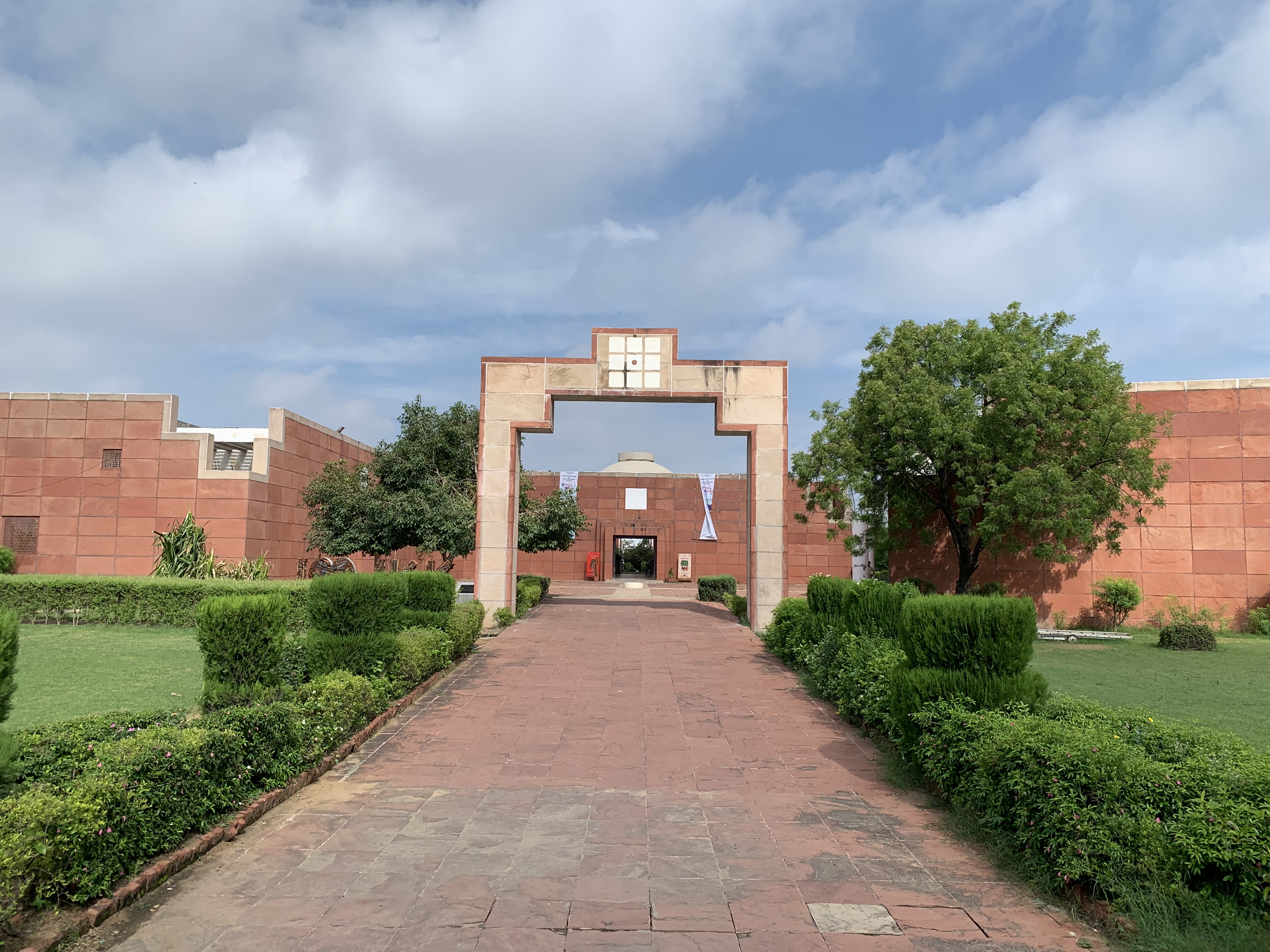
Entryway

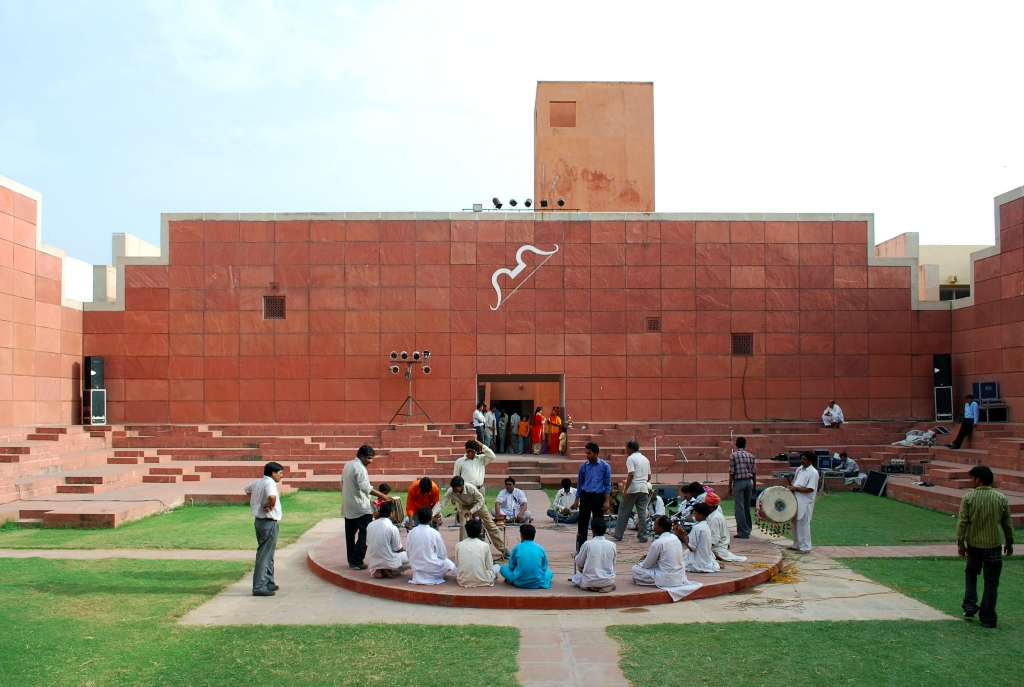
Amphitheatre

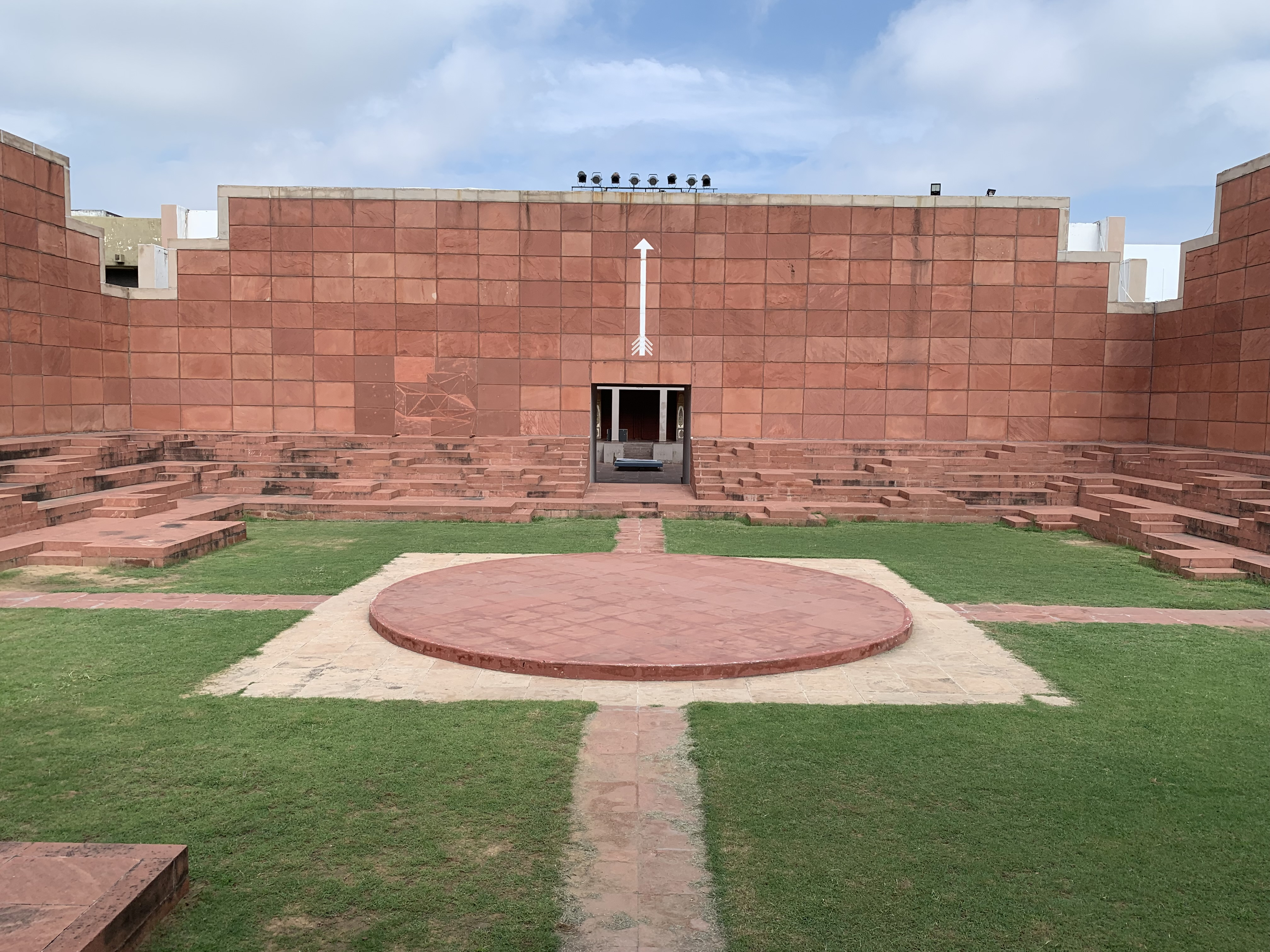
Amphitheatre

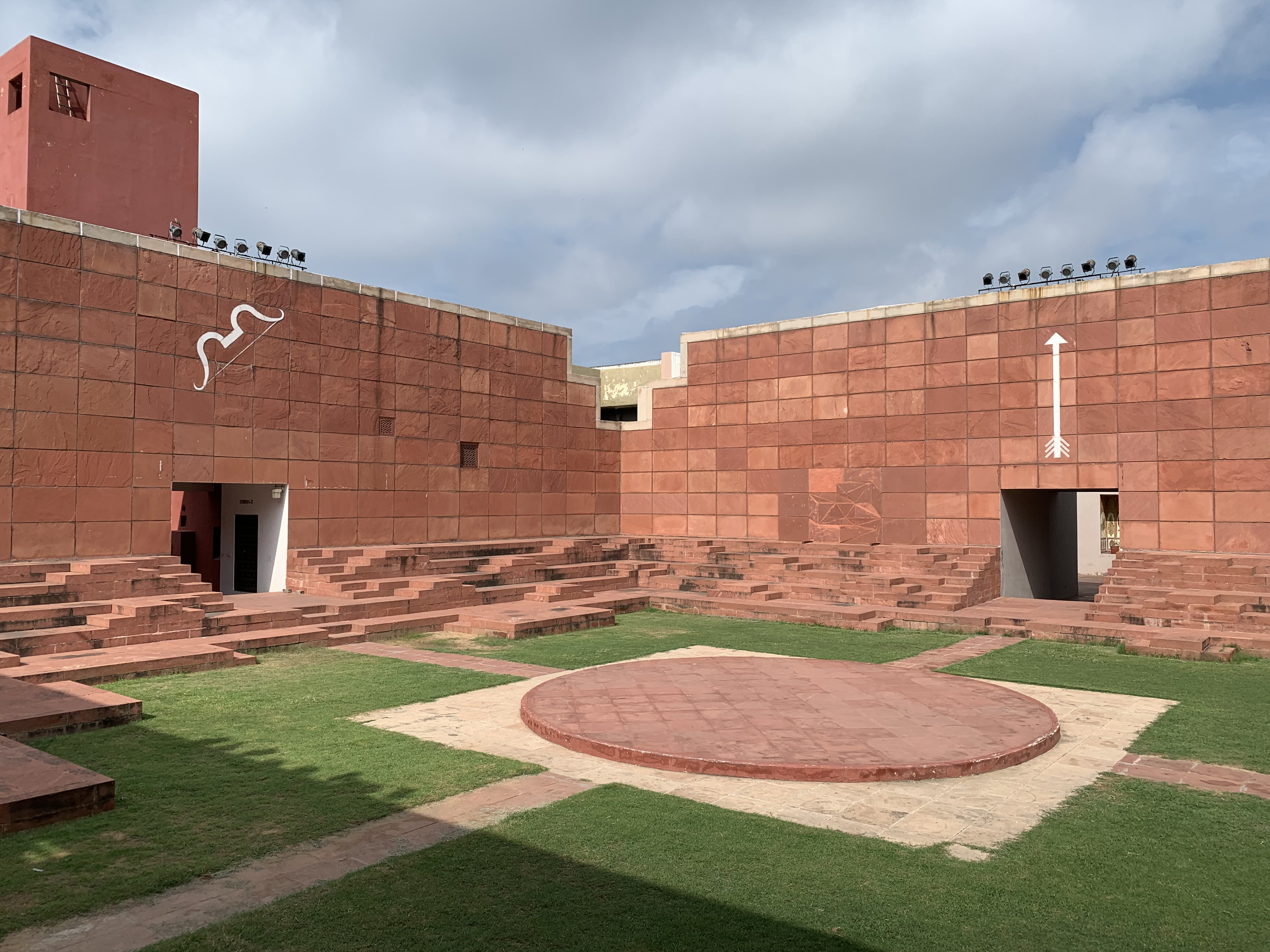
Amphitheatre

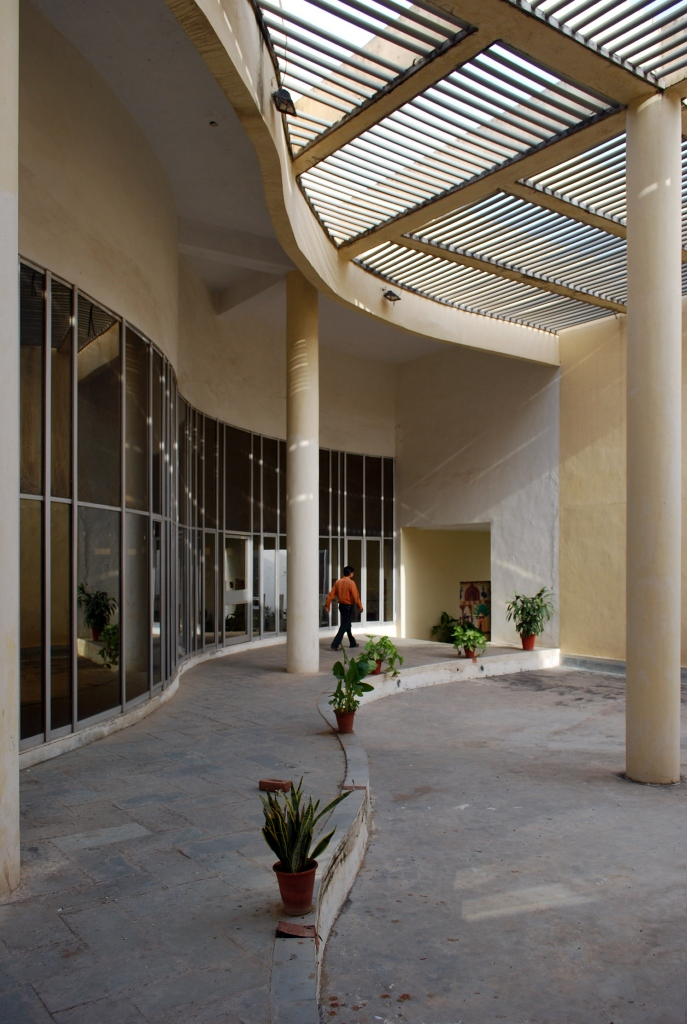
Pergola

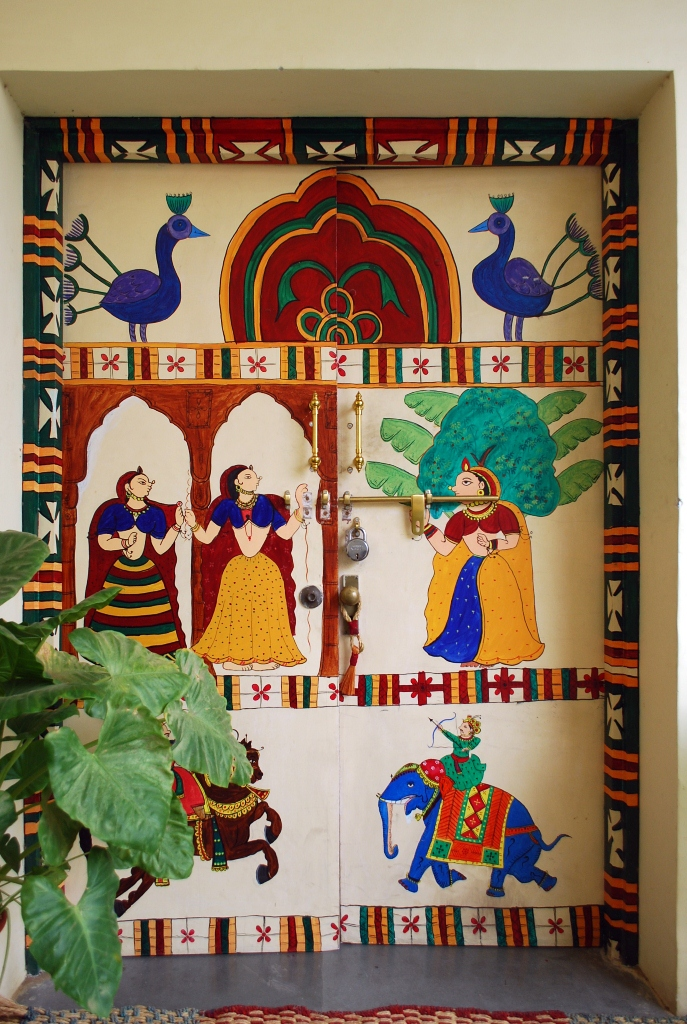
Door painted in Rajasthani Art

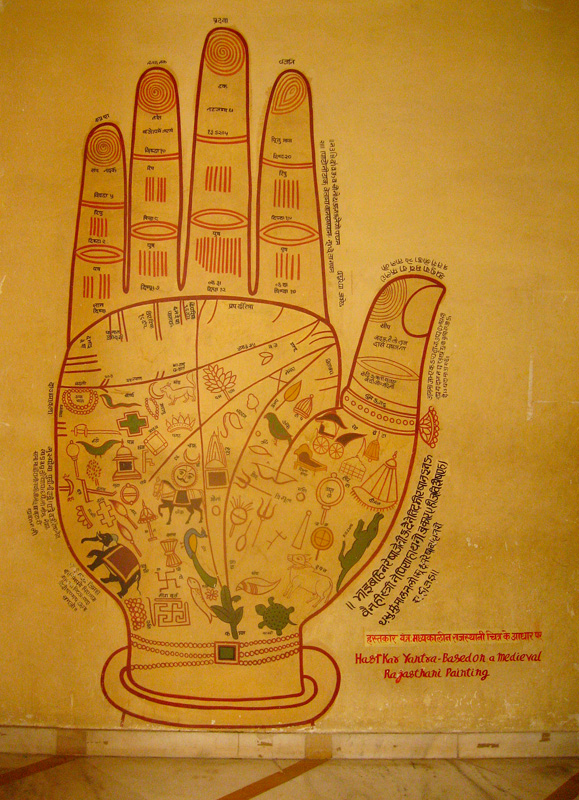
Hastkaar Yantra based on medieval Rajasthani painting

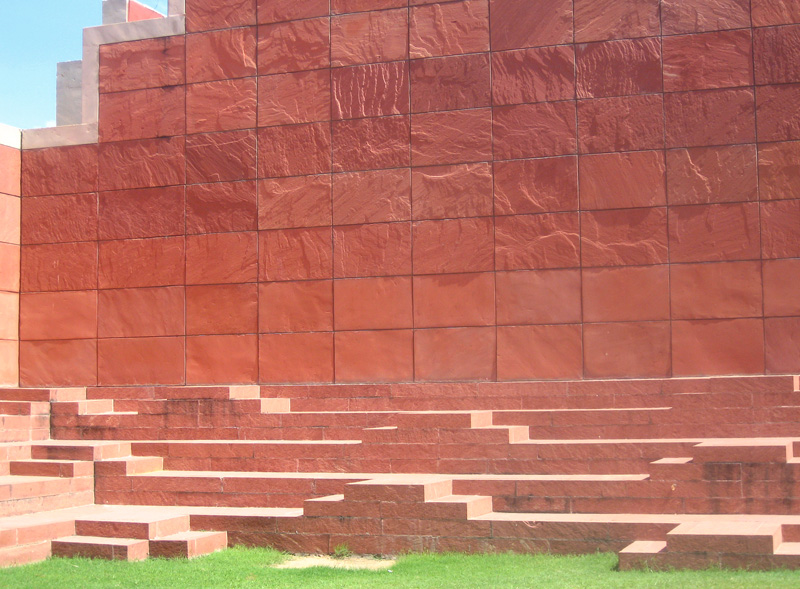
Central courtyard, Jawahar Kala Kendra, Jaipur

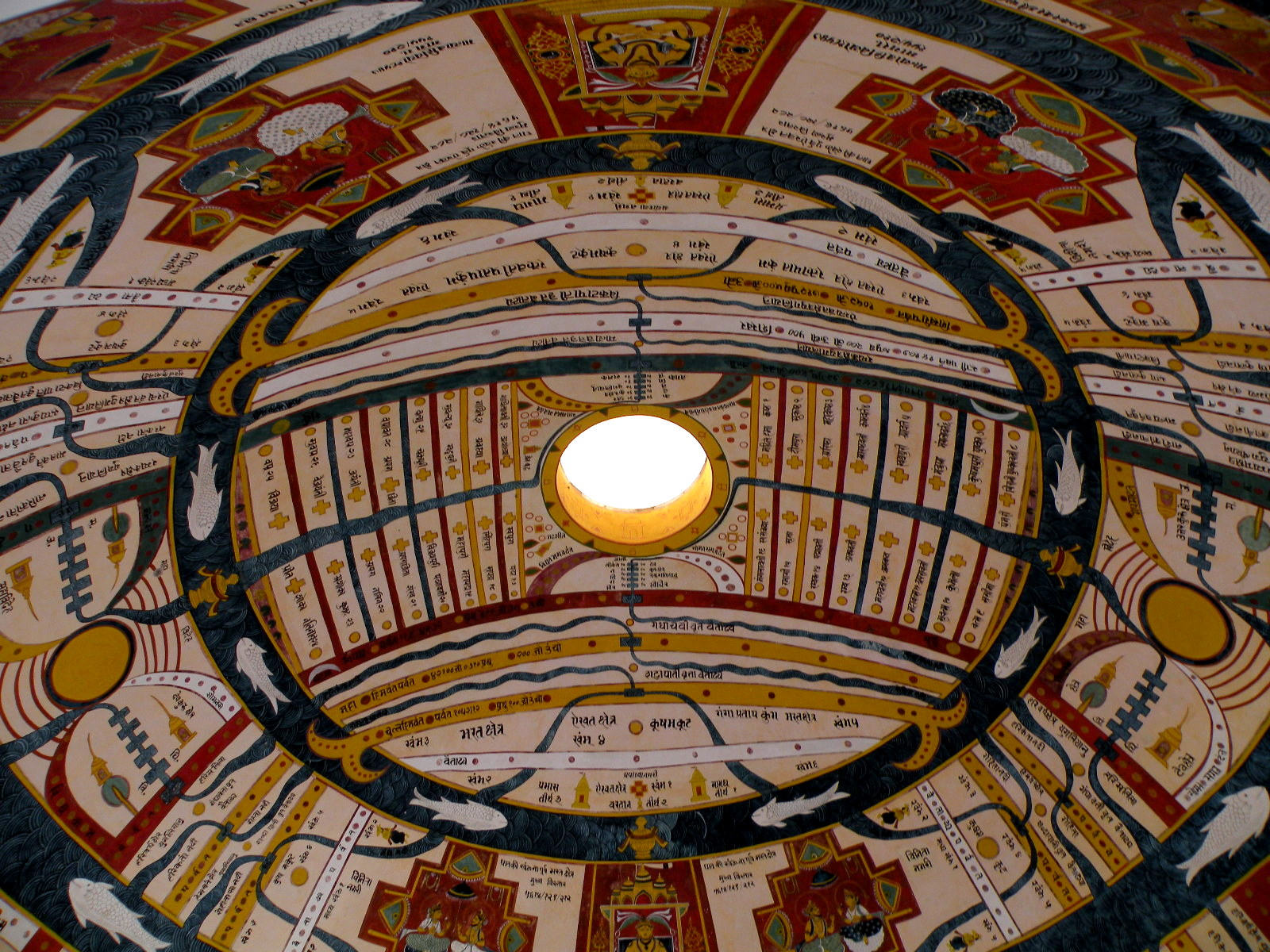
Ceiling of entrance foyer at Jawahar Kala Kendra, Jaipur

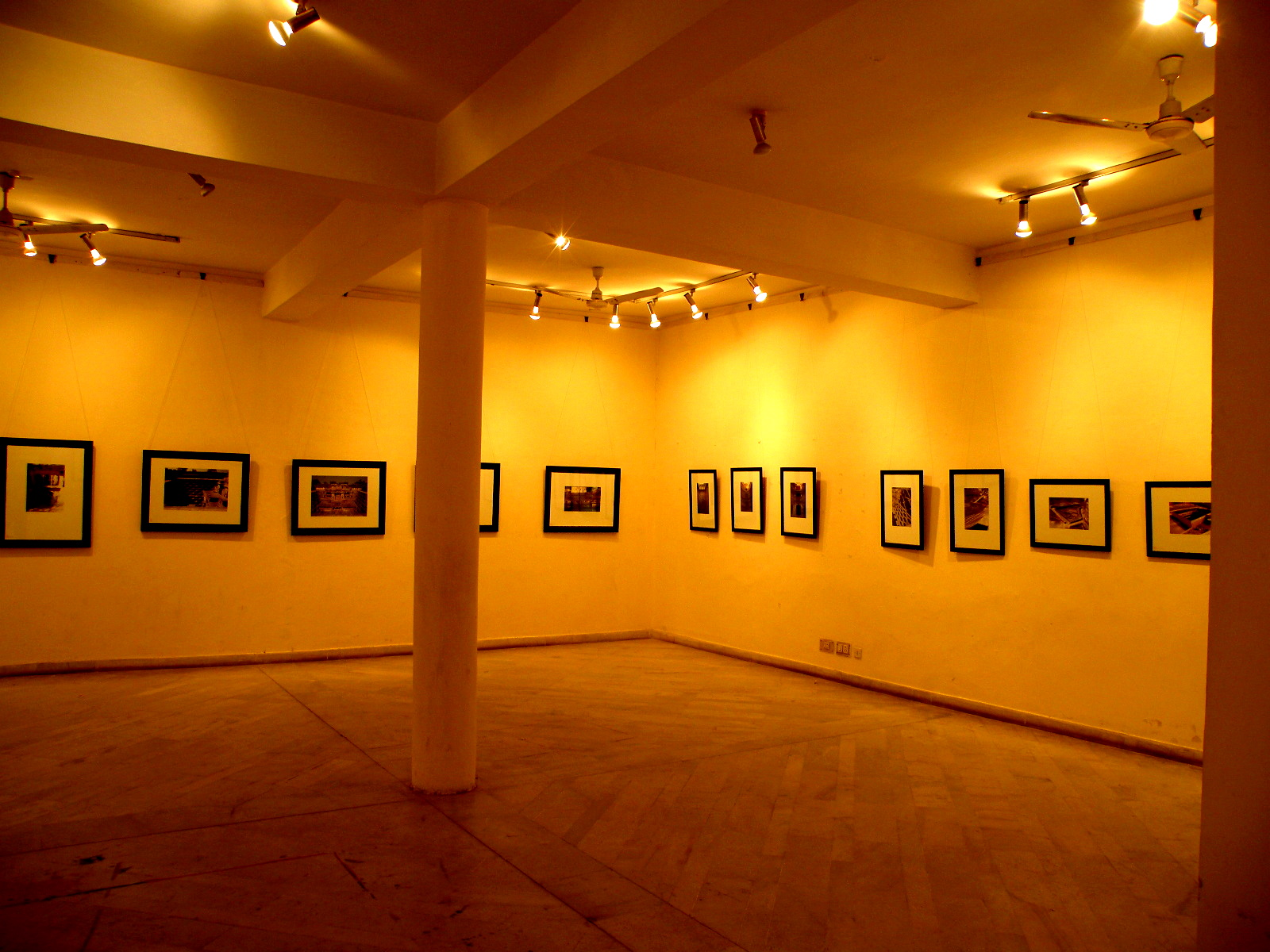
Display Area, Jawahar Kala Kendra, Jaipur

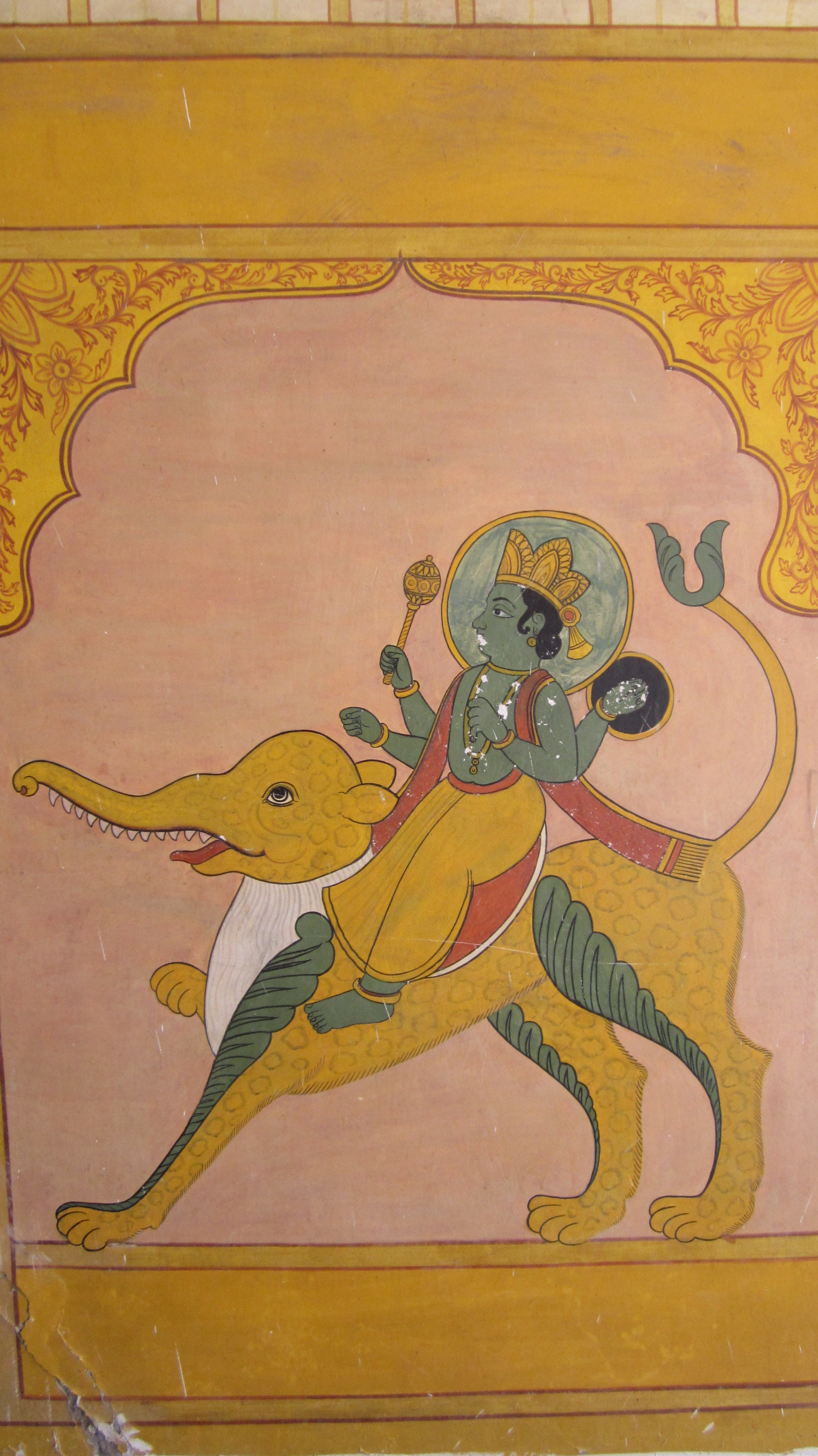
Planet Budh

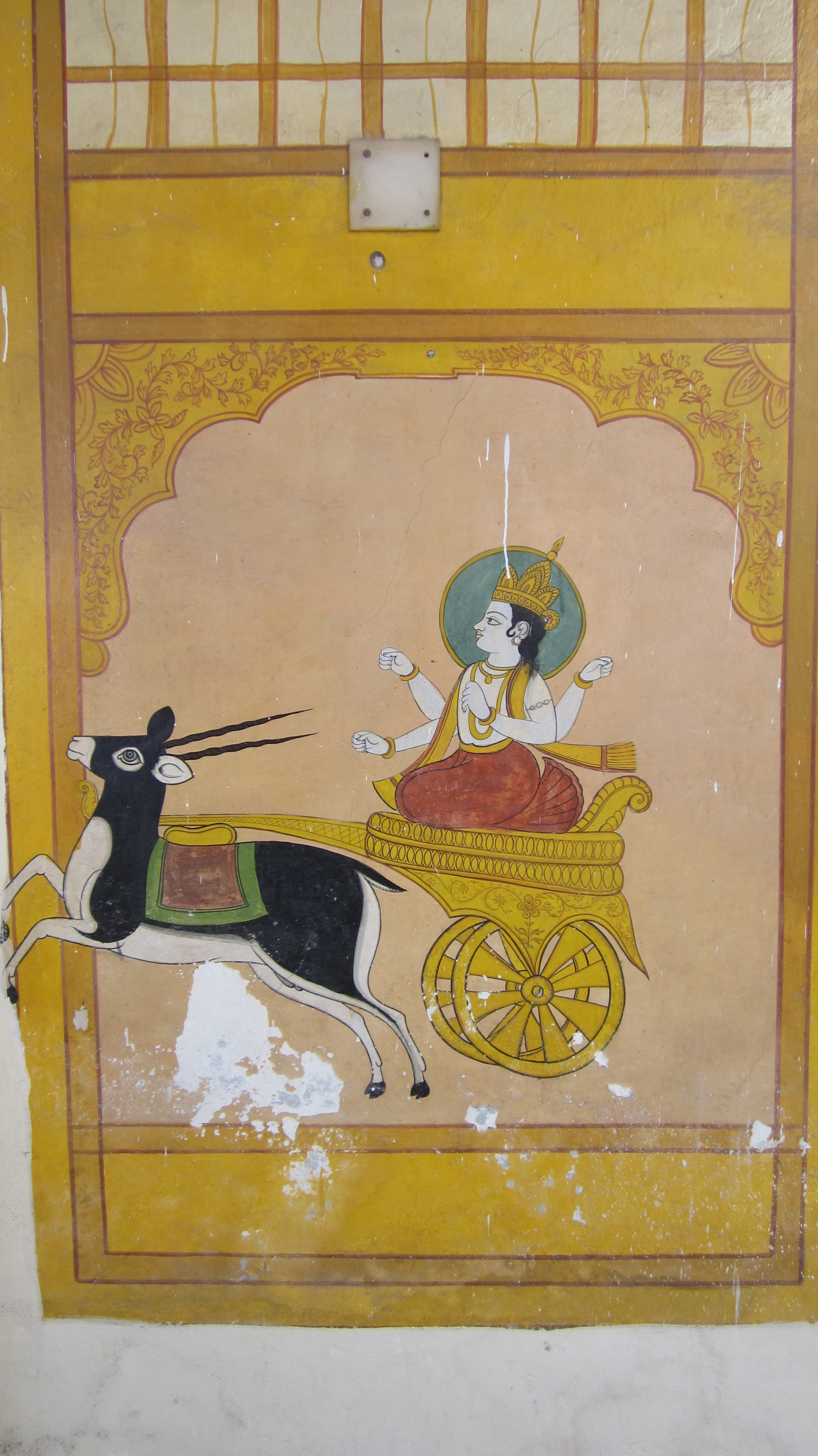
Planet Chandra

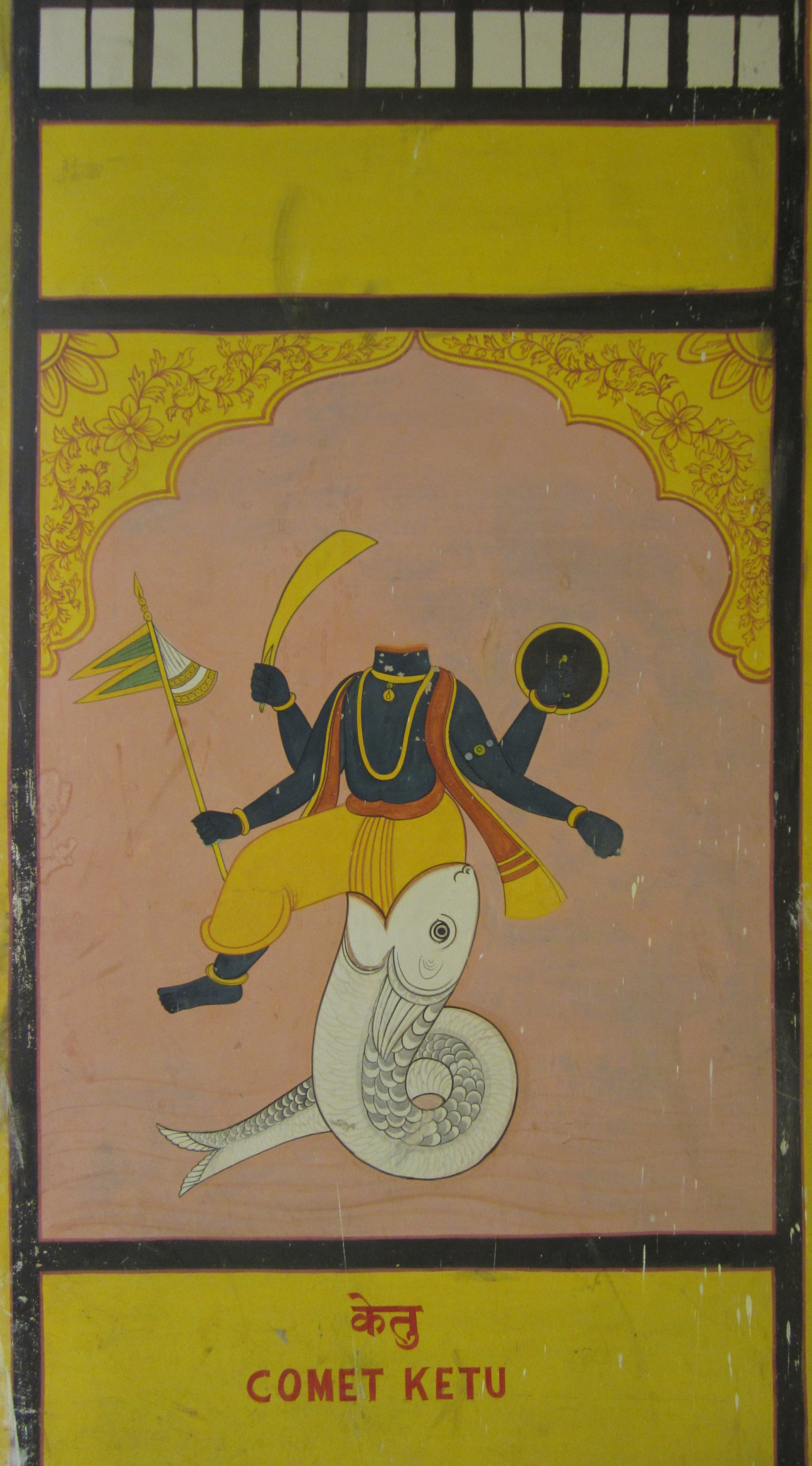
Planet Ketu

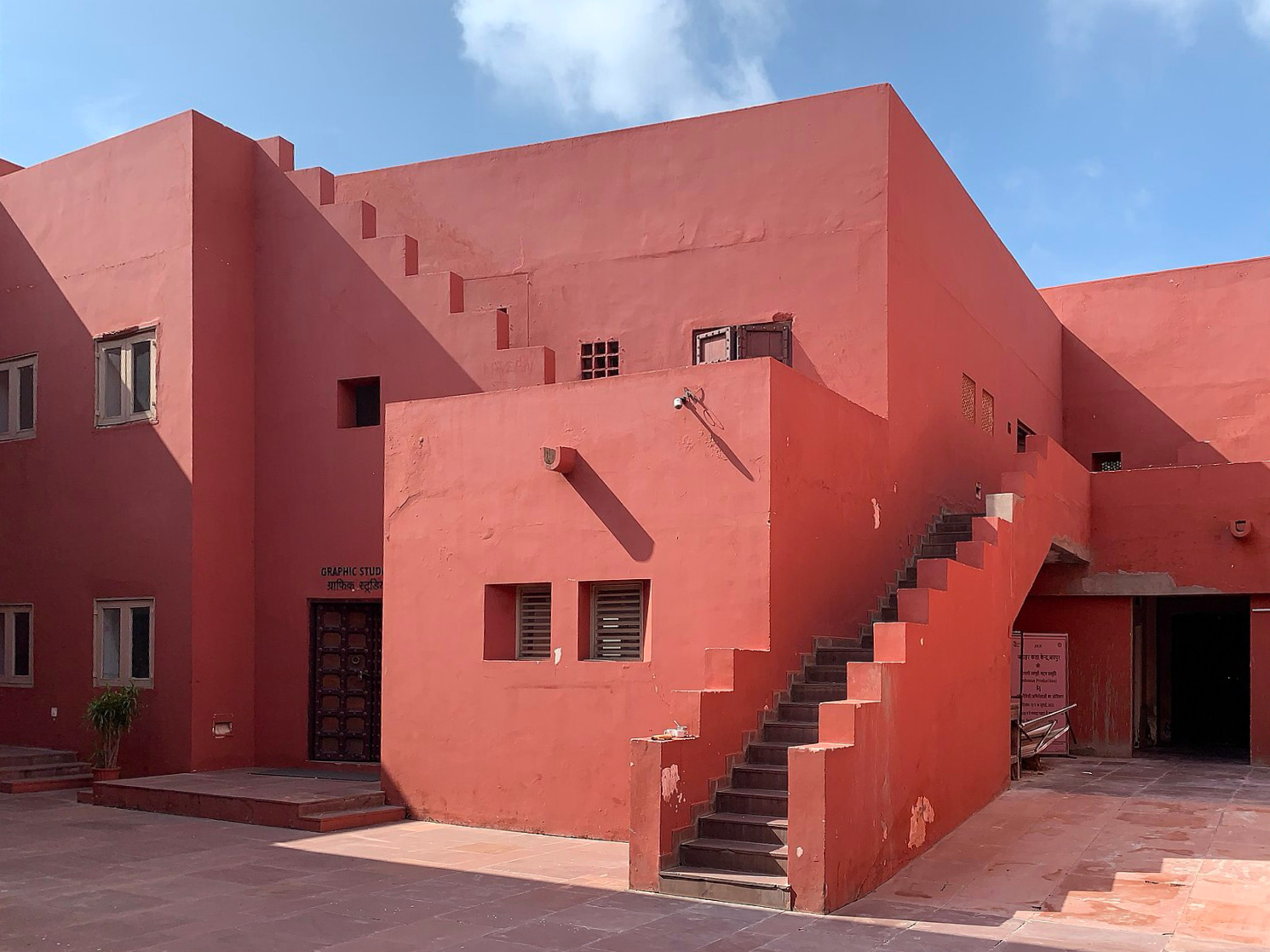
