= Brahmasthan =

A brahmasthan is a principle of Vedic architecture and community planning that designates the center point of a building or geographical area. Vedic architecture is based on Vastu Shastra.

The brahmasthan is a special central zone in a building. It is free from any obstructions in the form of a wall, pillar or beam, furniture or fixtures and is often well lit from above, by skylights for instance.

== See also ==
- Maharishi Sthapatya Veda § Features
