= Mamuni Mayan =

Tamil mythological character

Mamuni Mayan (Tamil: மாமுனி மாயாசுரன், romanized: Māmuṉi Māyāsuran) is an ancient sage referenced in Tamil literature. He is featured in works of Sangam literature such as the Cilappatikaram, Manimekalai, and Civaka Cintamani, identified with the asura Mayasura of the Hindu epic Mahabharata. Mayan is regarded to be the founder of the Vastu Shastra.

In Tamil tradition, Mayan is known as the progenitor of the original Veda, called Pranava Veda, and is credited with the authorship of the Mayamata Vastu Shastra as well as the Aintiram (Aindra, a school of grammar connected with the Tolkappiyam). He is also credited with the authorship of the Surya Siddhanta.

== See also ==
- Mayasura
- Kubera
- Vishvakarma
