= Siddipet railway station =

Railway Station in Siddipet, India

Siddipet Railway Station
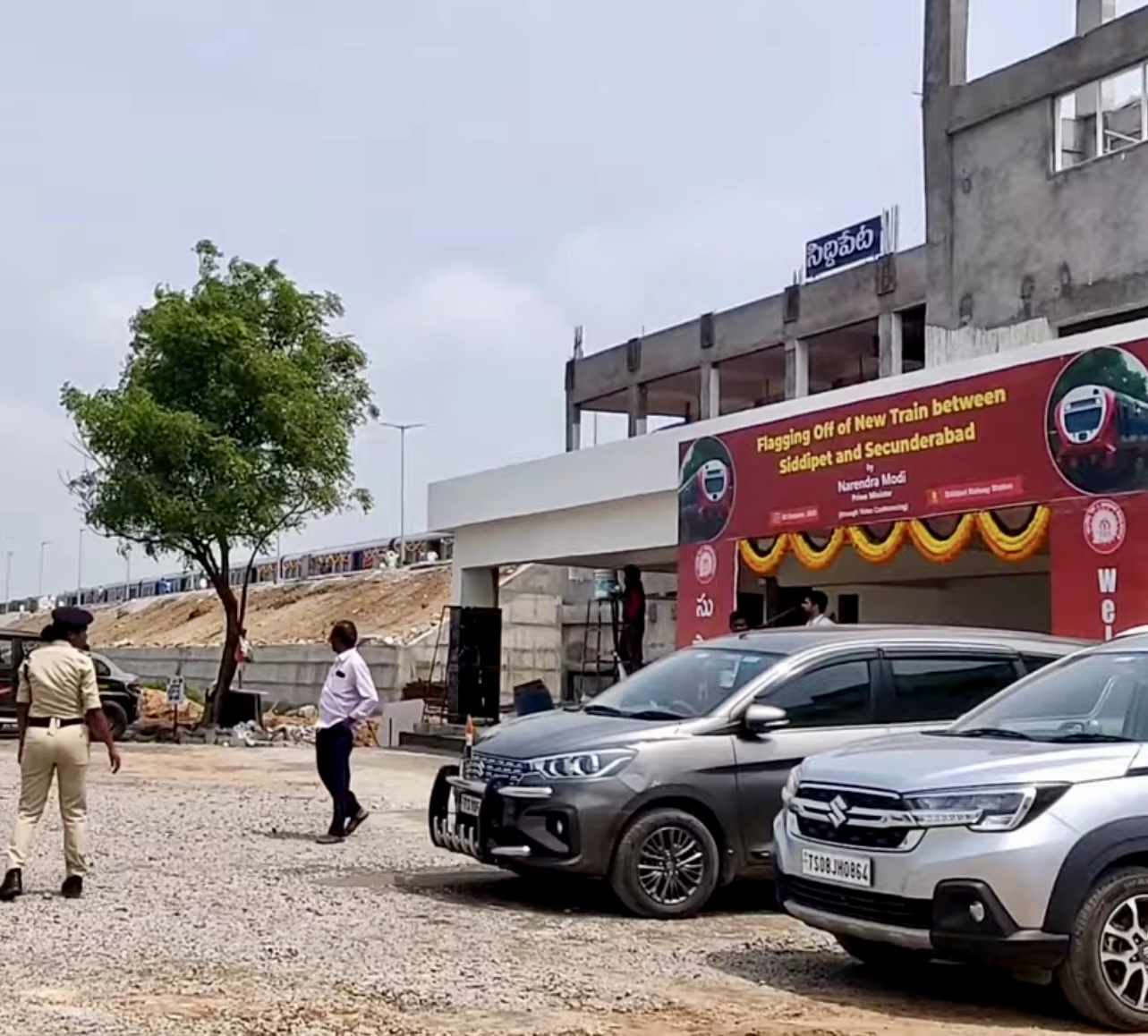

General information
- Location: KCR Colony, Shankar Nagar Lane 2 Siddipet, Telangana; India
- Coordinates: 18.115904°N 78.8854907°E
- System: Indian Railways station
- Owner: Indian Railways
- Operator: South Central Railway zone.
- Lines: Kothapalli–Manoharabad line; Kacheguda–Manmad section; Peddapalli–Nizamabad line
- Platforms: 3
- Tracks: 4

Construction
- Structure type: Standard (on ground)
- Parking: Yes
- Accessible: Disabled access

Other information
- Status: Functioning
- Station code: SIPT
- Zone(s): South Central Railway zone
- Division(s): Hyderabad

History
- Opened: 03-Oct-2023; 2 years ago

Services
Preceding station	Indian Railways	Following station
Secunderabad towards ?	Kacheguda–Manmad section	Manoharabad towards ?
Kottapalli towards ?	Peddapalli–Nizamabad section	Karimnagar towards ?
Location
- Location within Telangana Location within India

Siddipet Railway Station (station code SIPT) is a railway station in Siddipet District Headquarters. It serves the city of Siddipet in Telangana State, India. It comes under Hyderabad division of South Central Railway, opened in the year of 2023.

== Overview ==
The station is part of the Kothapalli–Manoharabad line.

The Manoharabad - Siddipet portion of the line was inaugurated on 3 October 2023 with a regular (6 days a week) Secunderabad-Siddipet DEMU train service.

== History ==
The Kothapalli-Manoharabad line is under construction. On June 29, 2022, the line received its first shipment of goods at Gajwel station. As of 2023, the line is completed up until Siddipet, with remaining distance to Kothapalli to be completed by 2025.

The Manoharabad - Siddipet portion of the line was inaugurated on 3 October 2023 with a regular Secunderabad-Siddipet DEMU train service.

== Trains ==
- 77653/54 Secunderabad - Siddipet DMU
- 77655/56 Secunderabad - Siddipet DMU

== See also ==
- Kothapalli-Manoharabad section
- Telangana
- Gajwel
