= Sircilla railway station =

Railway station in Sircilla, India

- Sircilla Railway Station in 2026

General information
- Location: Sircilla, Telangana; India
- Coordinates: 18.3738382°N 78.8529359°E
- System: Indian Railways station
- Owner: Indian Railways
- Operator: South Central Railway zone.
- Line: Kothapalli–Manoharabad line
- Platforms: 3
- Tracks: 4

Construction
- Structure type: Standard (on ground)
- Parking: Yes

Other information
- Status: Functioning
- Station code: SRCLA
- Zone(s): South Central Railway zone
- Division(s): Hyderabad

History
- Opened: 2026; 0 years ago
Location
- Location within Telangana Location within India

Sircilla Railway Station (station code SRCLA) is a railway station in Sircilla District Headquarters. It serves the city of Sircilla in Telangana State, India. It comes under Hyderabad division of South Central Railway, opened in the year of 2026.

== Overview ==
The station is part of the Kothapalli–Manoharabad line.

The Manoharabad - Siddipet portion of the line was inaugurated on 3 October 2023 with a regular (6 days a week) Secunderabad-Siddipet DEMU train service.

After this the line proceeded north with construction of station buildings at Gurralagondi, Chinnalingapur, and Sircilla outskirts.

== History ==
The Kothapalli-Manoharabad line is under construction. On June 29, 2022, the line received its first shipment of goods at Gajwel station.

The Manoharabad - Siddipet portion of the line was inaugurated on 3 October 2023 with a regular Secunderabad-Siddipet DEMU train service.

The construction continued in 2024 with the Sircilla railway station and Mid-Manair railway bridge in advanced stage of construction in 2026.

The final stage of the line will be through the Vemulawada area, finally connecting to Kothapalli railway station near Karimnagar.

== Originating Trains ==
- Sircilla-Secunderabad DEMU Special

== See also ==
- Kothapalli-Manoharabad section
- Telangana
- Sircilla
