= Karimnagar railway station =

Railway station in Karimnagar, Telangana, India

Karimnagar Railway Station
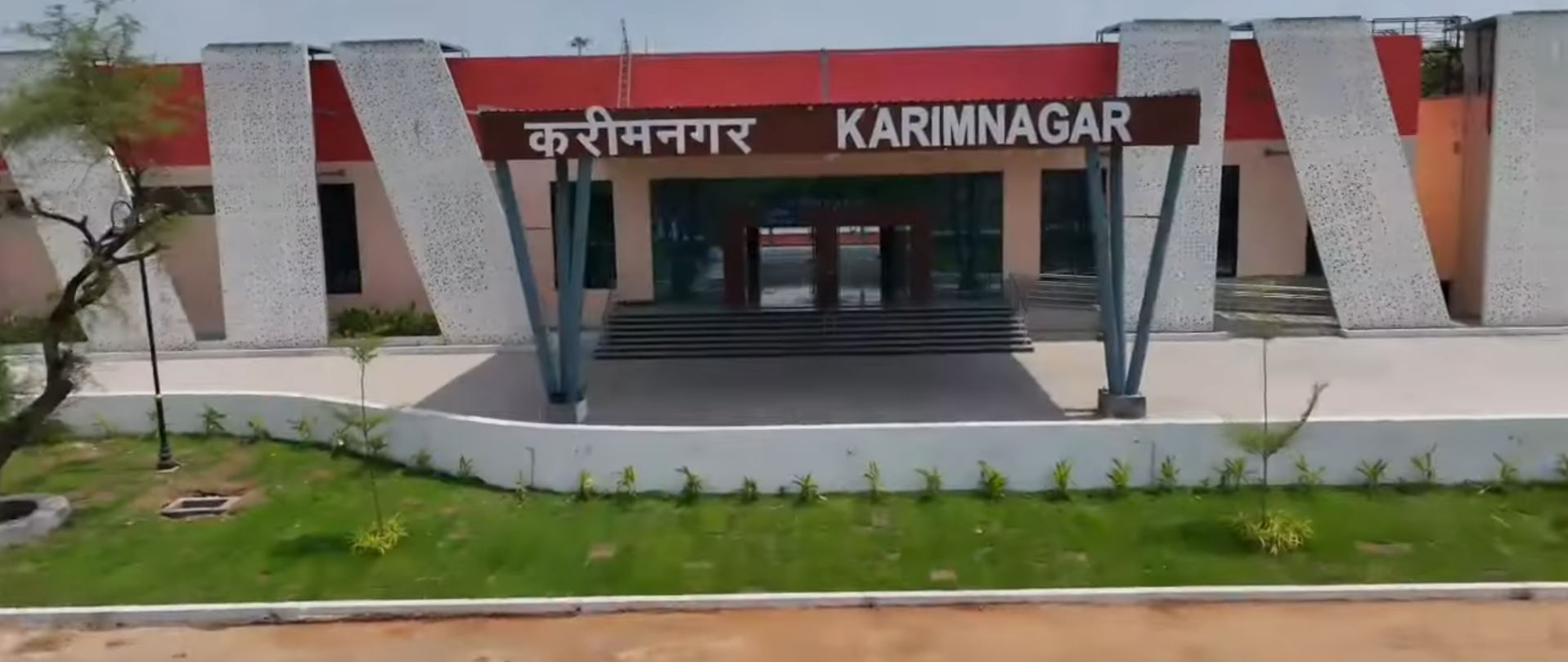
- Front façade of the station building

General information
- Location: Saraswatinagar, Choppadandi Road Karimnagar, Telangana; India
- Coordinates: 18.4590°N 79.1423°E
- Elevation: 265 metres (869 ft)
- System: Indian Railways station
- Owner: Indian Railways
- Operator: South Central Railway zone
- Lines: Peddapalli–Nizamabad line; Kothapalli–Manoharabad line; Kacheguda–Manmad section; Delhi–Chennai line
- Platforms: 3
- Tracks: 6

Construction
- Structure type: Standard (on ground)
- Parking: Yes
- Accessible: Disabled access

Other information
- Status: Functioning
- Station code: KRMR
- Zone(s): South Central Railway zone
- Division(s): Secunderabad
- Classification: Non-Suburban Grade-5 (NSG-3)

History
- Opened: 2001; 25 years ago
- Rebuilt: 22-May-2025; 16 months ago
- Electrified: 18-Feb-2019; 7 years ago

Services
Preceding station	Indian Railways	Following station
Kottapalli towards ?	Peddapalli–Nizamabad section	Peddapalli Junction towards ?
Manoharabad towards ?	Kacheguda–Manmad section	Nizamabad towards ?
Karimnagar towards ?	New Delhi–Chennai main line	Peddapalli Junction towards ?
Kothapalli–Manoharabad line
Location
- Location within Telangana Location within India

Karimnagar railway station (station code KRMR) is a fifth grade non-suburban (NSG–5) category Indian railway station in Secunderabad railway division of South Central Railway zone. It is located in Karimnagar of the Indian state of Telangana. It was selected as one of the 21 stations to be developed under Amrit Bharat Stations scheme.

== Overview ==
It is a single broad-gauge line located between Peddapalli–Nizamabad railway section connected to the Grand Trunk Route (Delhi-Chennai line) at Peddapalli (35 kilometres). Its neighborhood station is Kottapalli railway station. There is a new line of Kothapalli–Manoharabad, currently under construction. There is a Joulepoint EV charger adjacent to the station.

== History ==
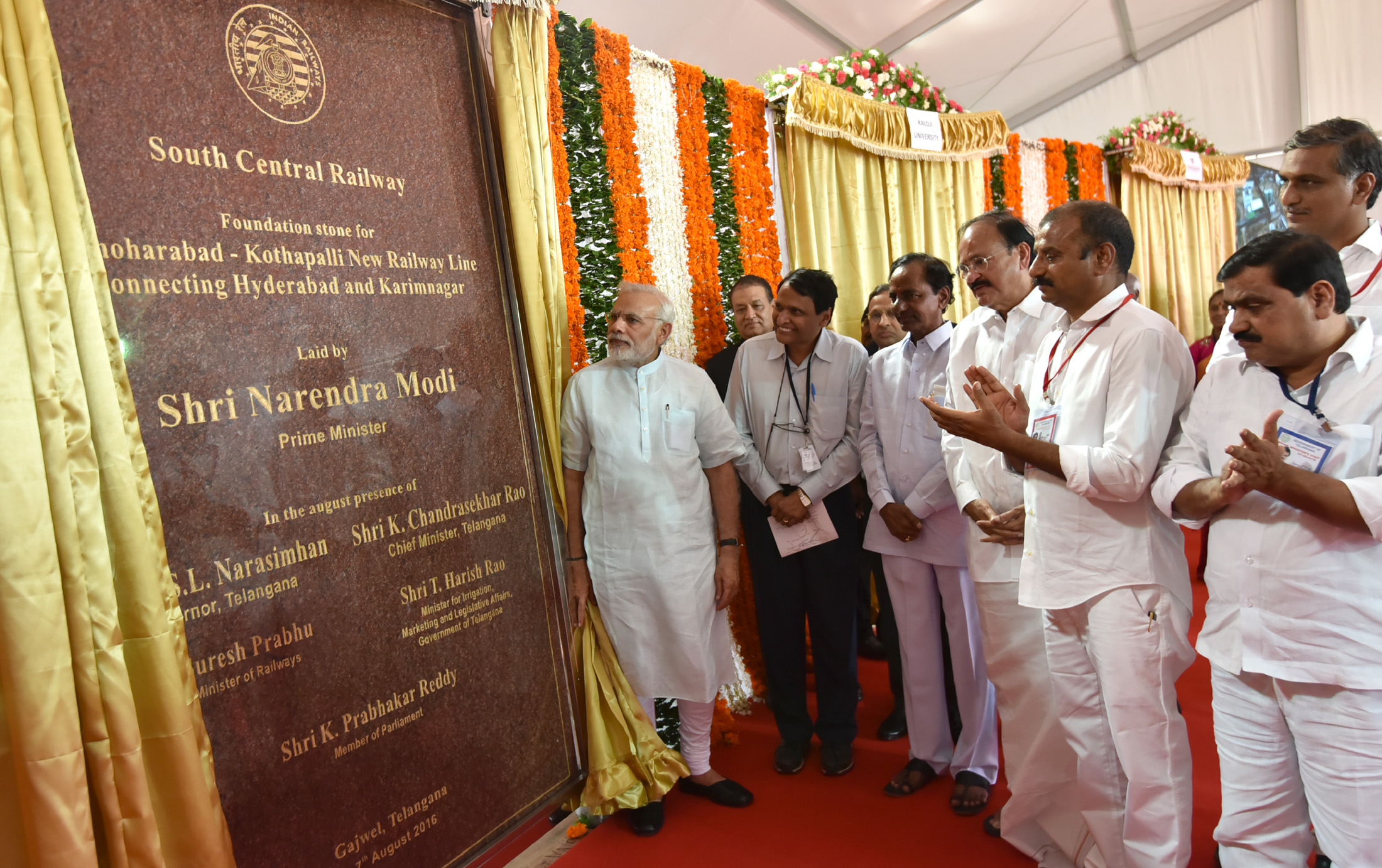
Kothapalli-Manoharabad railway foundation stone being laid

Karimnagar railway station's construction started in 1994 on the sanction of Peddapalli–Nizamabad line by P. V. Narasimha Rao, 10th prime minister of India. Peddapalli–Karimnagar (35 km (22 mi)) was laid between 1994 and 2001. Train service has been operational from year 2001 with the Karimnagar Peddapalli DEMU service, it was later extended to Sirpur town.

Karimnagar–Jagityal line was completed in March 2007. Train service from Karimnagar Jagityal started in the year 2007. The Karimnagar Tirupati weekly express was inaugurated in October 2012; it received a good response, therefore the train frequency increased from weekly to biweekly in 2013. The Peddapalli-Nizamabad line was completed in 25-March-2017 providing direct access to Nizamabad from Karimnagar. Started electrification in Oct 2018 and it took 3.5 Years to completed the whole stretch from Peddapalli to Nizamabad, final CRS run has done at NZB on 24-Feb-2022.

The Kothapalli-Manoharabad line is under construction. On June 29, 2022, the line received its first shipment of goods at Gajwel station. As of 2023, the line is completed up until Siddipet, with remaining distance to Kothapalli to be completed by 2025.

In 2023, construction work began at the railway station to add a second and third platform, part of the Amrit Bharat Station Scheme, a modernization and expansion effort by the government.

In September 2023, the final location survey (FLS) for the Karimnagar-Hasanparthy new line was sanctioned by South Central Railways. The line will connect intermediate towns like Manakundur and Huzarabad on the rail map. Additionally, it will help support the granite industry of Karimnagar district by allowing shorter access to Kakinda Port.

In October 2023, the Karimnagar-Nizamabad MEMU was extended up to Bodhan.

The modernization of the station building was completed in May 2025.

== Originating and passing trains ==
- Tirupati–Karimnagar Superfast Express (12761/62)
- Kacheguda–Nizamabad-Karimnagar DEMU (57601/02)
- Bodhan-Nizamabad-Karimnagar MEMU (67774/73)
- Karimnagar-Sirpur-Karimnagar MEMU (67771/72)
- Nanded-Tiruchanur (Tirupati) Express (17633/34)
- Nanded-Dharmavaram Express via Tirupati (17635/36)

== Gallery ==
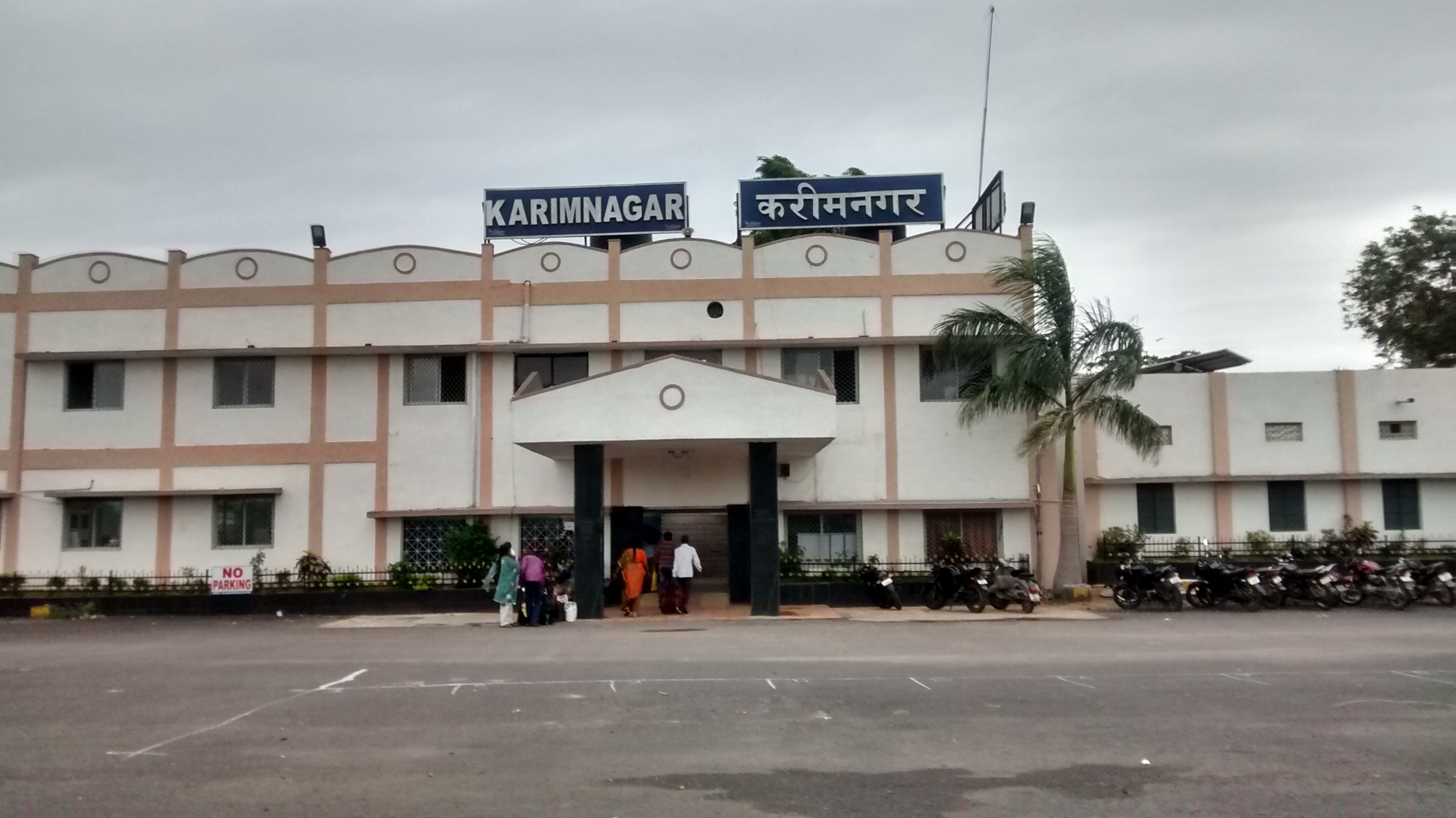
facade prior to 2025 remodel

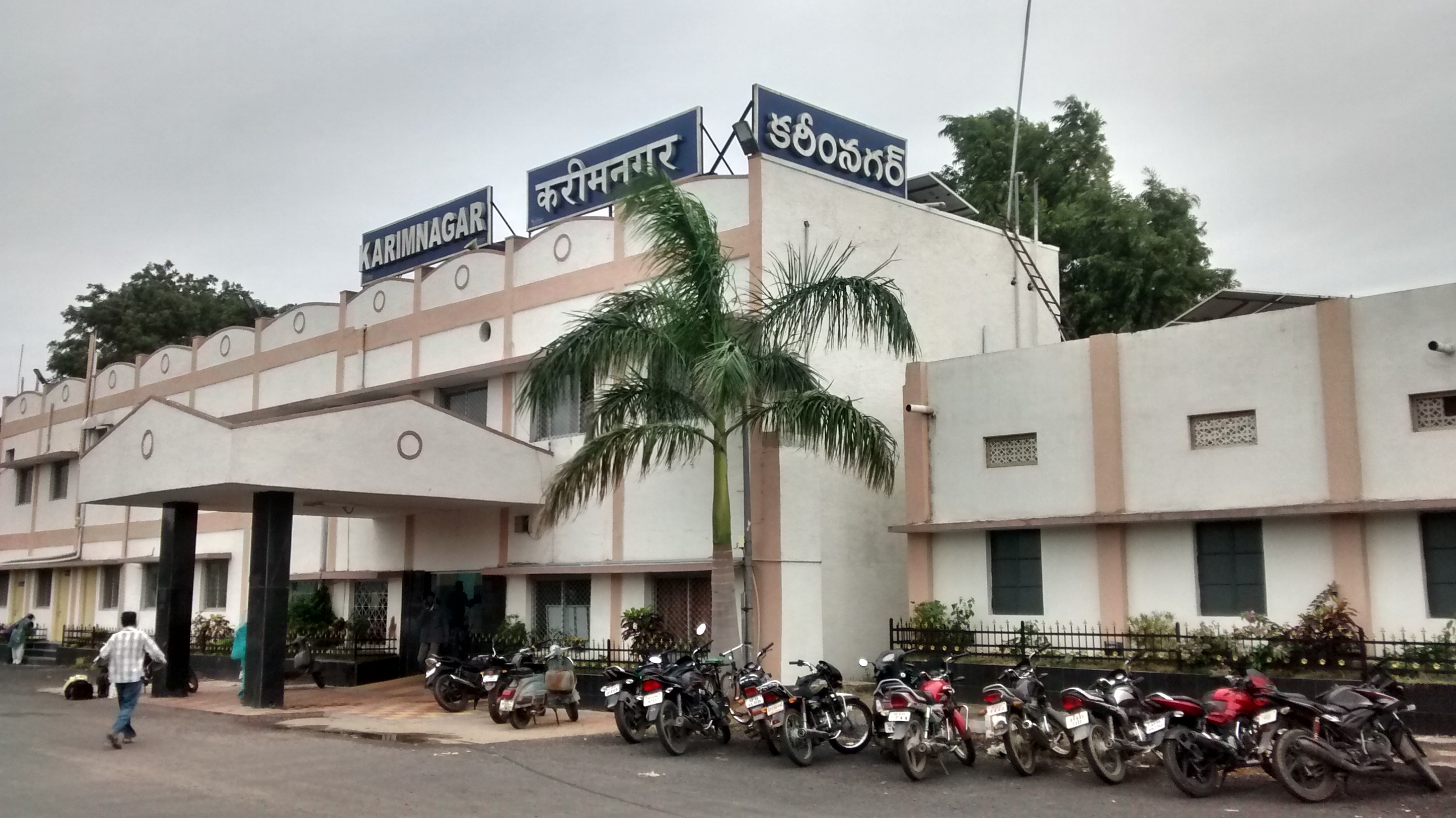
facade prior to 2025 remodel

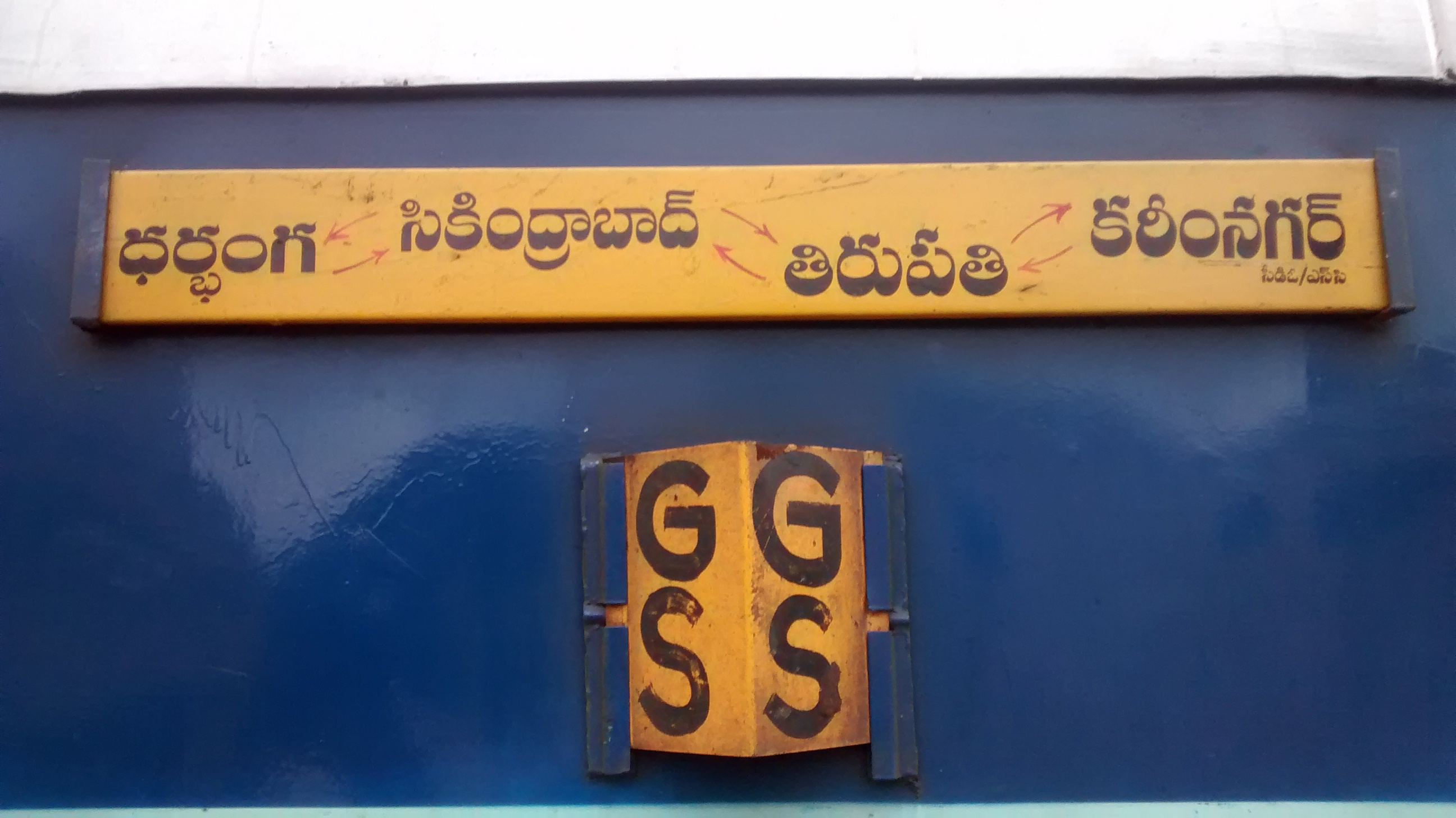

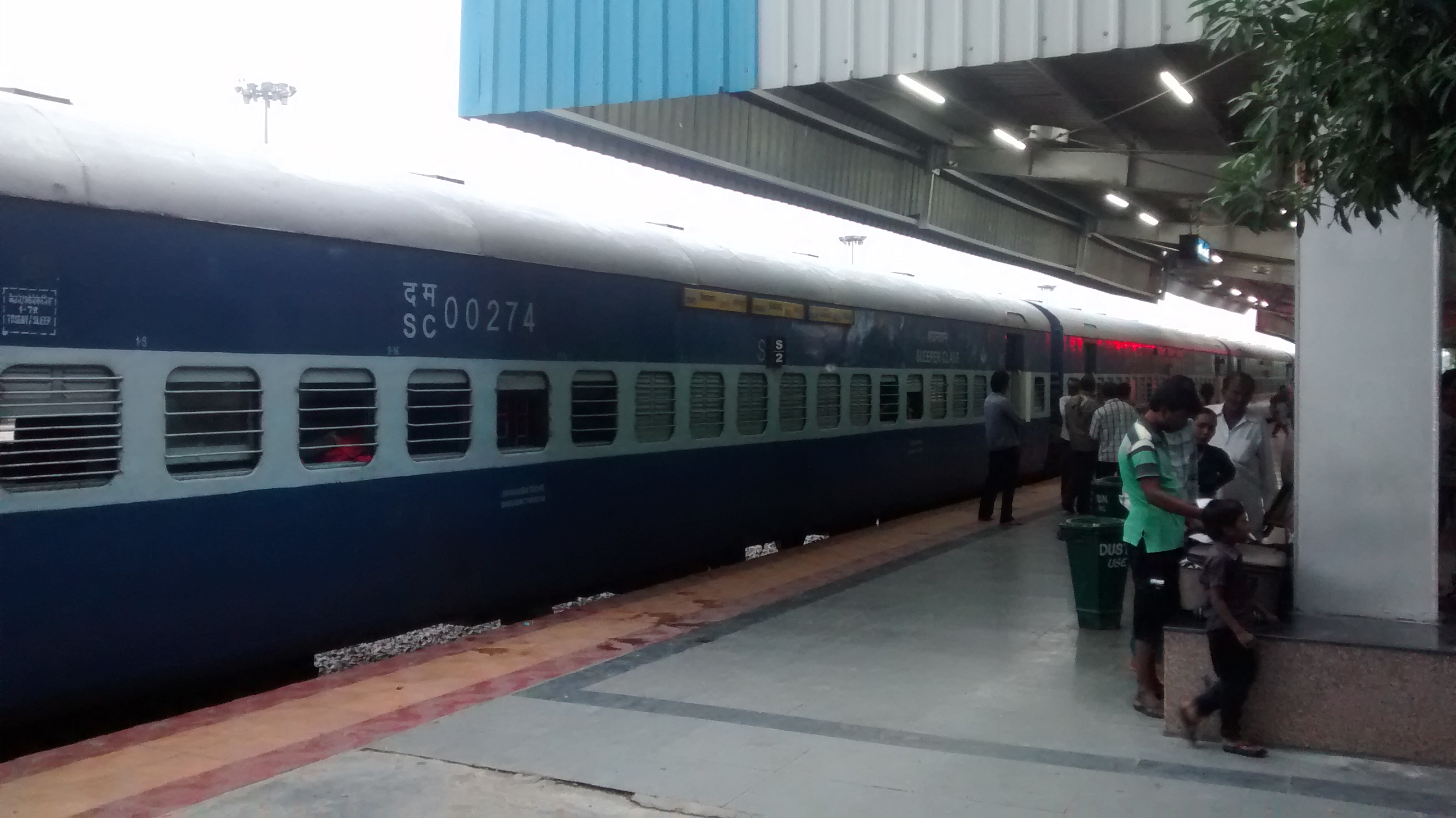

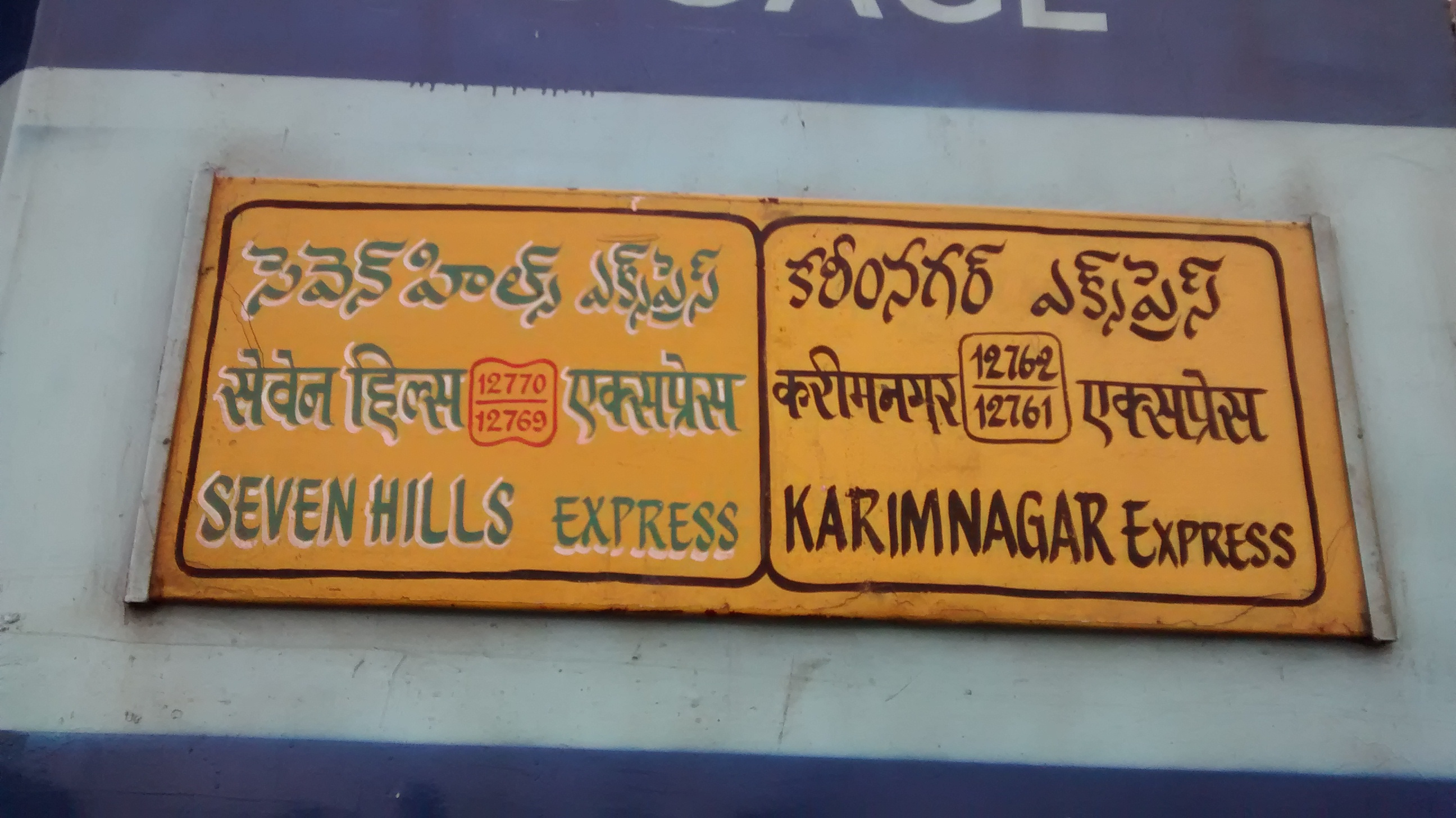

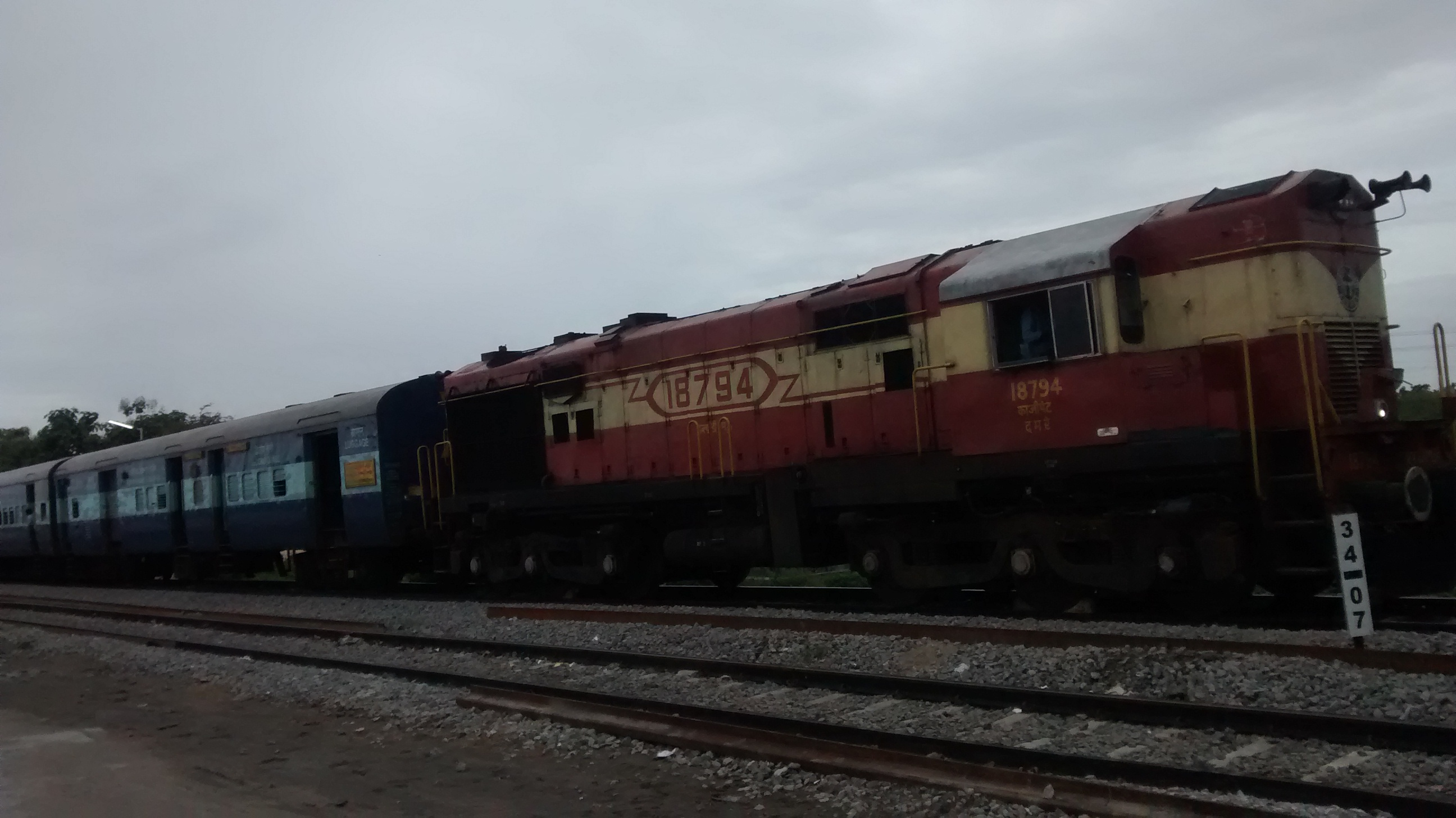

== See also ==
- Peddapalli–Nizamabad section
- Kothapalli-Manoharabad section
