= Kothapalli (Haveli) =

Village in Telangana, India

Kothapalli కొత్తపల్లి
- Revenue village
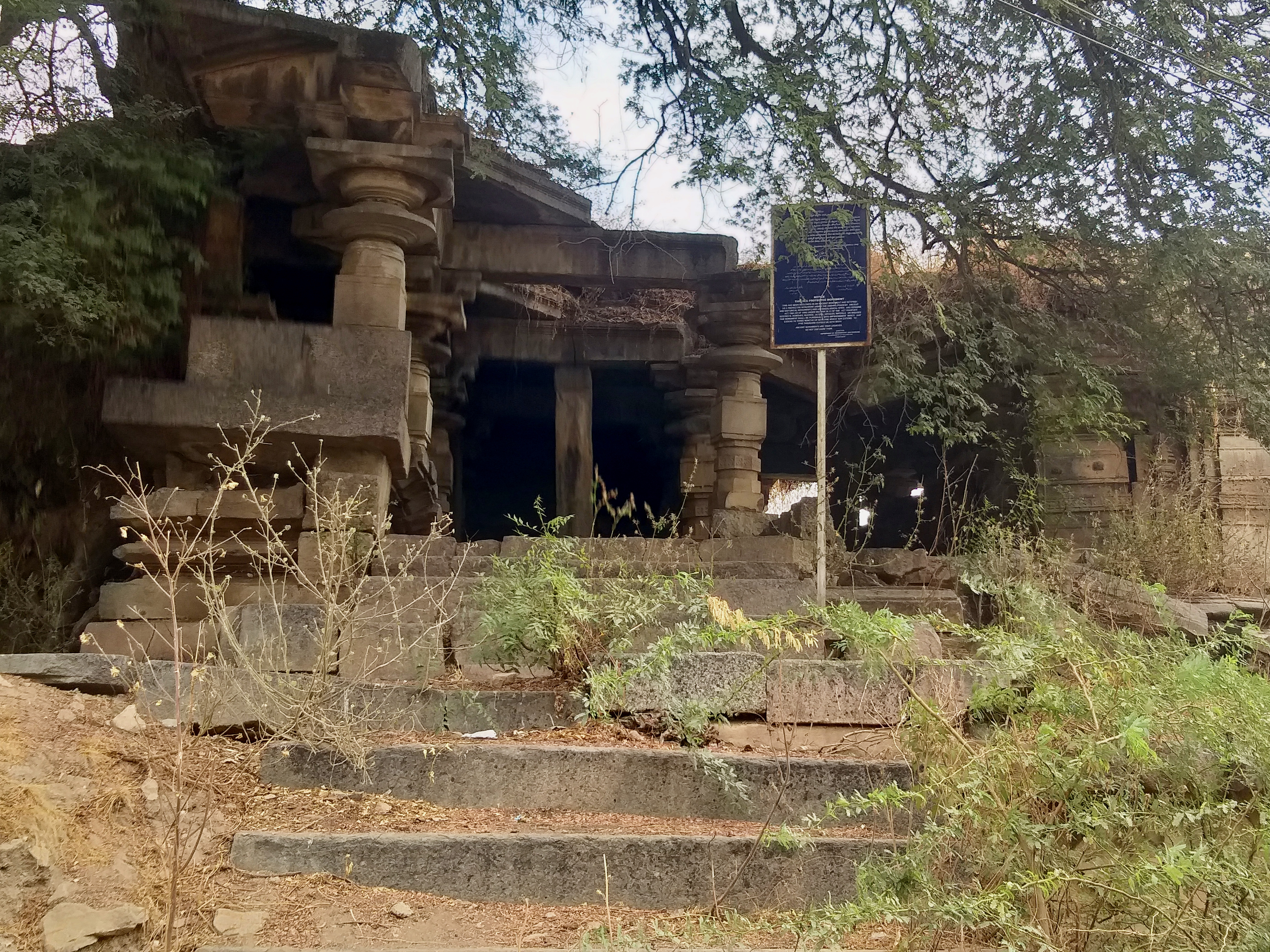
- Chikati Gudi ruins within Kothapalli Haveli, 2021

- Location within Telangana Location within India
- Coordinates: 18°29′47″N 79°05′36″E
- Country: India
- State: Telangana
- District: Karimnagar
- Mandal: Kothapalli

Government
  - Type: Sarpanch

Area
  - Total: 16.06 km^{2} (6.20 sq mi)
- Elevation: 294 m (965 ft)

Population (2011)
  - Total: 11,058
- Postal Index Number: 505451

Kothapalli (Haveli) (Telugu: కొత్తపల్లి), or Kothapalli, is a Revenue Village and a semi-town in Kothapalli Mandal, Karimnagar district, Telangana, India. The village used to be in the Karimnagar mandal of the old Karimnagar district. Following the district reorganization of Telangana, it was included in the newly formed Kothapalli Mandal. Kothapalli was formed as a municipal corporation on 2 August 2018, as part of the Municipal Amendment Bill by the Government of Telangana.

== Geography ==
Kothapalli (Haveli) is situated on the northeastern portion of Kothapalli Mandal, near an artificial lake named "Kothapalli Ceruvu" (Telugu: కొత్తపల్లి చెరువు). The village covers an area of 1606 hectares of land, with the National Highway 563 running through its southwestern edge.

== Demographics ==
According to the 2011 Indian Census, the village has 2,821 households. Out of the 11,058 total population, 5,401 are males and 5,657 are females. The number of scheduled castes is 2,143 while the number of scheduled tribes is 118. Its census location code is 572308.

== Education ==
In 2023, a Government Medical College was opened in the town.

== Administrative status ==
The village used to be a part of Karimnagar mandal within Karimnagar district. After the formation of Telangana as a separate state in 2014, the government made Kothapalli (Haveli) and 11 surrounding villages into a new mandal starting on 10 November 2016.

== Ancient temples ==
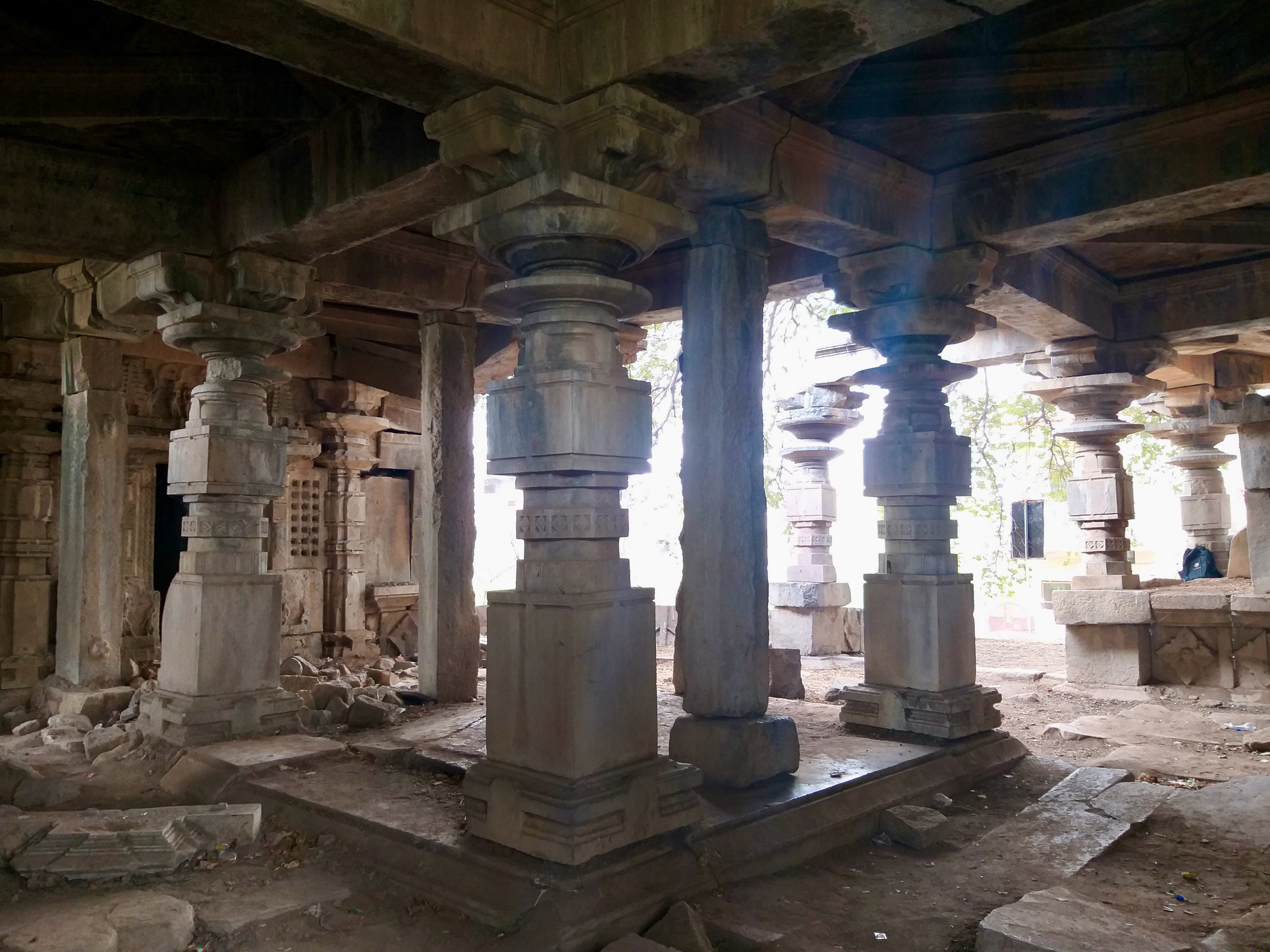
Internal view of Chikati Gudi in Kothapalli Haveli

The ruins of Chikati Gudi (Telugu: చీకటి గుడి), an ancient Hindu temple, can be found within the village. It is somewhat similar to the main Shiva temple found in Nagunur village 9 km to the east. It is one of the many Hindu, Jain and Buddhist ruins in Telangana. Following independence, the interior of the temple was cleaned, but the structure remained neglected for decades. Unlike other Hindu temples, which usually have their entrances on their east side, Chikati Gudi faces southward and has a porch there for entrance.

Like other important temples in India, Chikati Gudi stands on a large platform, measuring about 2 meters from the base to the surface. The surface is molded, and the base extends about 3.2 meters around the temple to provide a circumambulation path for the visitors.

Its mandapa (hall) is shared by three garbhagriya (sanctums, built in the trikutesvara design). The walls are carved with many cells and frams by sculptors, and the pillars are finely carved sculptures.

The doorways to the sanctums are carved with Nataraja on the architrave. It is believed that the temple have been dedicated to the principle deity Shiva.

== Transport ==
National Highway 563 runs through this town.

=== Rail ===
Kothapalli has an existing railway station (KPHI) and is connected to Nizambad-Peddapalli railway line. Kothapalli is also a part of the new Kothapalli-Manoharabad railway line which will connect Karimnagar to Hyderabad and multiple important districts in between which were hitherto unconnected on the railway map.
