= Sircilla =

Siricilla Sircilla, Sirisilla, Sirisala
- Town
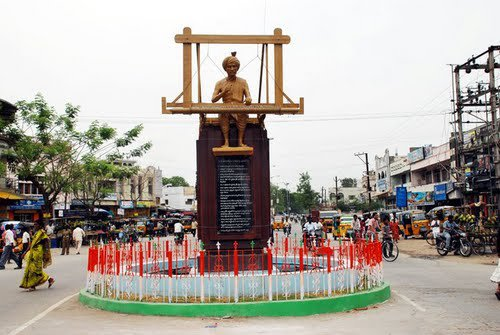
- Nickname: Textile Town
- Location in Telangana, India Siricilla (India)
- Coordinates: 18.38°N 78.83°E
- Country: India
- State: Telangana
- District: Rajanna Sircilla

Government
  - Type: Municipal Council
  - Body: Sircilla Municipal Council

Area
  - Total: 55.87 km^{2} (21.57 sq mi)
- Elevation: 322 m (1,056 ft)

Population (2020)
  - Total: 92,910
  - Rank: 16th in Telangana
  - Density: 1,663/km^{2} (4,307/sq mi)

Languages
  - Official: Telugu, Urdu
- Time zone: UTC+5:30 (IST)
- PIN: 505 301
- Vehicle registration: TS-23
- Railway station: Sircilla railway station
- Website: sircillamunicipality.telangana.gov.in

Siricilla (also spelled as Sircilla or Sirsilla) is a town and the district headquarters of Rajanna Siricilla district in the Indian state of Telangana. It is located on the banks of Manair river in the Siricilla mandal of Siricilla revenue division. It is popularly known as Textile Town due to the presence of large number of power looms, textile processing and dyeing units. It is the biggest textile hub in the state of Telangana with over 40,000 power looms. Siricilla, along with Warangal is proposed to be developed as a mega textile zone by the Telangana government. The first Visalandhra Mahasabha in Telangana was held at Siricilla during the Visalandhra movement. Scenes from the 2023 Telugu film Veera Simha Reddy were also shot here.

== Geography ==
The town is located at 18.38°N 78.83°E. It has an average elevation of 322 metres (1056 feet). By road, it is located 120 km north of Secunderabad, 40 km west of Karimnagar, 30 km north of Siddipet and 56 km east of Kamareddy. It is 10 km away from the famous Vemulawada temple.

== Governance ==
Siricilla Municipality was constituted in 1952 and is now classified as a first grade municipality with 34 election wards. The jurisdiction of the civic body is spread over an area of 55.57 km^{2} (21.46 mi^{2}).

== Transport ==
=== Road ===
A new national highway numbered NH 365B connects Siricilla with different district headquarters of the state Suryapet-Jangaon-Siddipet-Siricilla. State Highway 11 passes through this town.

=== Railway ===
Manoharabad-Kothapalli broad gauge line connects the Sircilla railway station with Secunderabad, Karimnagar, Gajwel, Siddipet and Manoharabad.

== Demographics ==
As of 2011 census, the town has a population of 92,910 within the municipal limits of 55.47 km^{2} area. Hindus form the majority religious group with 92% of the population, followed by 6% Muslims and 2% others.

Telugu is the most widely spoken language. Urdu is spoken among the Muslim communities.

== Politics ==
The Sircilla Municipal Council is the local governmental body of the town of Sircilla. The jurisdiction of the civic body is spread over an area of 55.47km^{2} (21.41 mi^{2}).

The Bharat Rashtra Samithi (BRS) commands an absolute majority of 33 seats in the 39-seat-assembly. Jindam Kala Chaprakani and Manche Srinivas of the BRS are the municipal chairperson and vice chairperson respectively.

Sircilla padmashali political start with Gudla Laxminarsu, Rudra Shankaraiah...

== Economy ==
The Siricilla economy is largely driven by the textile industry with presence of numerous textile and textile-allied industries spread across the town and nearby villages. It is also the main commercial center for trade and commerce in the district.

The town is also a major education and healthcare hub of the region. The town has a sprawling Textile park nearby, an apparel park for garments industry with companies like Shoppers stop, Gokuldas Image, etc. setting up their manufacturing units.

Starting 2018, the Government of Telangana is giving orders to manufacture 1 crore meters of Bathumma Sarees worth 350 crore rupees a year. The town is now a bustling town with strong economy in Telangana. The town also has various major tourists places in proximity, like Sri Rajarajeshwara temple, Sri Rajarajeshwara Mid Manair reservoir, Ananthagiri reservoir, Malkapet reservoir, Peddamma jungle, etc.

== Education ==
There are numerous educational institutions in the town. The town has one of the oldest junior colleges in the state, a government degree and a polytechnic college.

Jawaharlal Nehru Technological University (JNTU) - Rajanna Siricilla is a government engineering college under Jawaharlal Nehru Technological University, Hyderabad.

A Government nursing college for women was inaugurated in 2021. There is also a Government Agricultural polytechnic college. A Government Medical college was inaugurated in 2023 with a teaching hospital. Apart from these there are many private degree and technical institutions in the town.

=== Politics ===
Siricilla assembly constituency is a legislative assembly constituency in Telangana.It is represented by K. T. Rama Rao.

== Notable people ==
- Midde Ramulu – Oggu Katha artist from Hanmajipet village.
- C. Narayana Reddy - Lyricist and the first recipient of Jnanpith Award in Telugu.
- Anabheri Prabhakar Rao – Freedom fighter and major activist of Telangana Rebellion.
- Chennamaneni Rajeshwara Rao – Freedom fighter and six times ex-MLA of Siricilla.
- Chennamaneni Vidyasagar Rao – Entrepreneur, ex-central home minister and former governor of Maharashtra and Tamil Nadu
- Venu Yeldandi - Film actor, comedian and Director.
- Paidi Jairaj - Indian Actor, Director and Producer.
- K. T. Rama Rao - Former Minister for IT, Municipal Administraion and Rural Development, Industries and MLA for Sircilla
