= Peddapalli Junction railway station =

Railway station in Telangana, India

Peddapalli
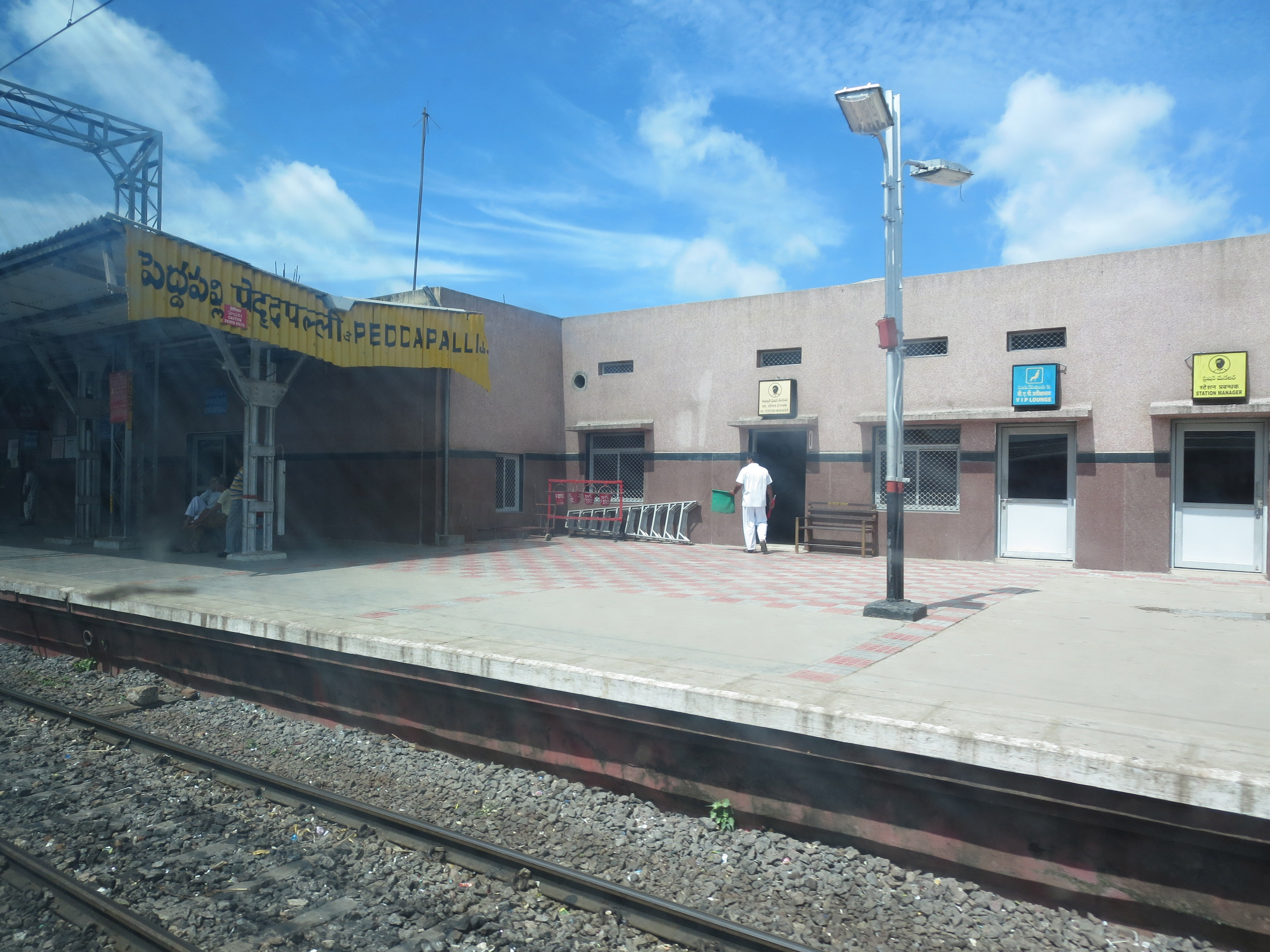

General information
- Location: Peddapalli, Telangana; India
- Coordinates: 18.6137°N 79.3921°E
- Elevation: 230 metres (750 ft)
- System: Express train & Passenger train Station
- Lines: New Delhi–Chennai main line; Peddapalli–Nizamabad line; Kothapalli–Manoharabad line; Kacheguda–Manmad section
- Platforms: 4
- Tracks: 6

Construction
- Structure type: Standard (on-ground station)
- Parking: Available (Paid)

Other information
- Status: Functioning
- Station code: PDPL
- Zone(s): South Central Railway zone
- Division(s): Secunderabad
- Fare zone: South central railway

History
- Opened: 1929

Services
Preceding station	Indian Railways	Following station
Kazipet towards ?	New Delhi–Chennai main line	Ramagundam towards ?
Karimnagar towards ?	Peddapalli–Nizamabad section	Peddapalli Junction towards ?
Location
- Location within Telangana Location within India

Peddapalli (station code: PDPL) is a fifth grade non-suburban (NSG–5) category Indian railway station in Secunderabad railway division of South Central Railway zone. It is located in Peddapalli of the Indian state of Telangana. It was selected as one of the 21 stations to be developed under Amrit Bharat Stations scheme. The station is located on New Delhi–Chennai main line that connects North and South India, and also serves as the junction point for the Peddapalli-Nizambad line.

== History ==
The railway line between Kazipet and Balharshah was completed in 1929, which made Chennai to directly link to Delhi. Peddapalli–Nizamabad railway line (177 km) was sanctioned by P.V. Narasimha Rao, 10th Prime Minister of India in the year of 1994. Peddapalli-Karimnagar railway line was completed and train services began in 2001 and later on Karimnagar–Jagityal line was completed and demu services were started in 2007. The entire line to Nizamabad was completed in the year 2017. The station was upgraded in Amrit Bharat Station Scheme in 2023.

== Layout and services ==
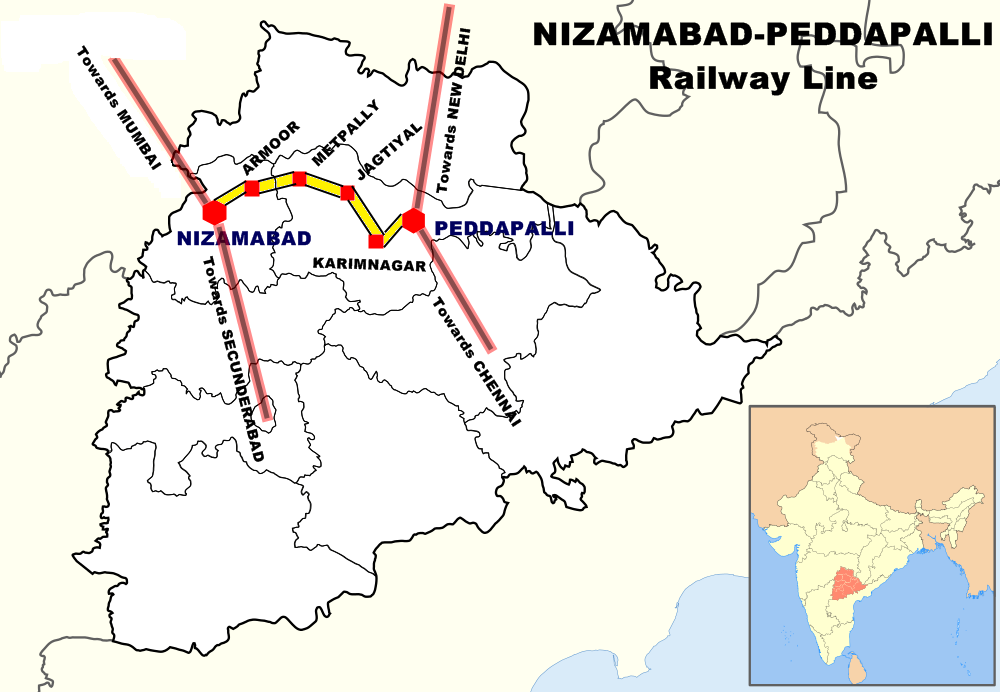
Peddapalli Jn. location

The station is situated on Delhi–Chennai line which is broad-gauge double electrified. And the single line that passes towards Nizamabad initially started as a diesel line but now stands fully electrified, where it meets Secunderabad–Manmad line. The station is served by 22 trains every day and 14 non-daily trains. Most of the trains halting or passing through this station are bound for New Delhi. As of August 2019, there are no trains that directly connect Peddapalli to Nizamabad or vice versa but there are numerous train services running to and fro Nizamabad till Karimnagar and from Karimnagar till Peddapalli.

== See also ==
- Ramagundam railway station
- Hazur Sahib Nanded railway station
- List of railway stations in India
