= Nizamabad Junction railway station =

Railway junction station in Nizamabad, Telangana

Nizamabad Junction
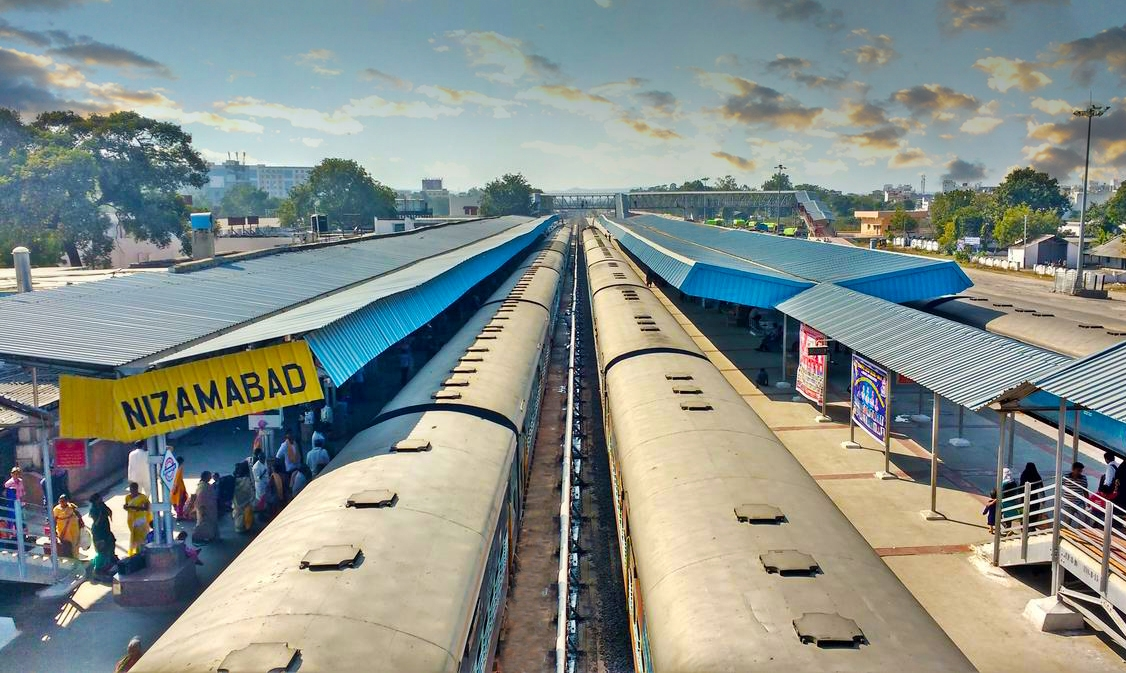
- View from a foot overbridge

General information
- Location: NH 63, Godown Road, Nizamabad, Telangana; India
- Coordinates: 18°40′44″N 78°06′13″E
- System: Commuter, Inter-city and Regional rail station
- Owner: Indian Railways
- Operator: South Central Railway zone
- Lines: Kacheguda–Manmad section, Peddapalli–Nizamabad section, Nizamabad–Bodhan
- Platforms: 3
- Tracks: 5 (5 ft 6 in (1,676 mm) broad gauge) +2 Extra Tracks for Accident Relief & Medical Vans

Construction
- Structure type: At grade
- Parking: Yes
- Accessible: Disabled access

Other information
- Status: Functioning
- Station code: NZB
- Zone(s): South Central Railway
- Division(s): Hyderabad
- Classification: Non-Suburban Grade-3 (NSG-3)

History
- Opened: 1905; 121 years ago
- Electrified: Single electric Line; 24-Feb-2022; 4 years ago

Passengers
- 20,000 (approximately)

Services
| Preceding station | Indian Railways | Following station |
|---|---|---|
| Dichpally towards ? | Kacheguda–Manmad section | Jankampet towards ? |
| Mamidipalle towards ? | Peddapalli–Nizamabad section | Jankampet towards ? |
Location
- Location within Telangana Location within India

Nizamabad Junction railway station (station code: NZB) is a second grade non-suburban (NSG–2) category Indian railway station in Hyderabad railway division of South Central Railway zone. It serves the city of Nizamabad in the Indian state of Telangana. It is a major station on Secunderabad–Manmad line, also serving as the junction point for Secunderabad, Peddapalli Junction, Jankampet/Mudkhed junctions.

Jankampet Junction railway station is another station located in the city from where the Secunderabad–Manmad line branch towards Bodhan. It was selected as one of the 21 stations to be developed under Amrit Bharat Stations scheme.

== History ==
The Nizam of Hyderabad ruled over the Deccan region during 18th century and under his reign the railway line between Secunderabad and Manmad was constructed in the year 1905. The railway station was named after then ruler of the Nizam state Nizam-ul-Mulk as Nizamabad.

On 30 June 2004 the SCR operated the last metre-gauge train on the Nizamabad–Manoharabad line bringing to an end the metre gauge services which started in the 1930s on the Secunderabad–Manmad line of the Nizam's State Railways (formerly Hyderabad–Godavari Valley Railways)

== Line and location ==
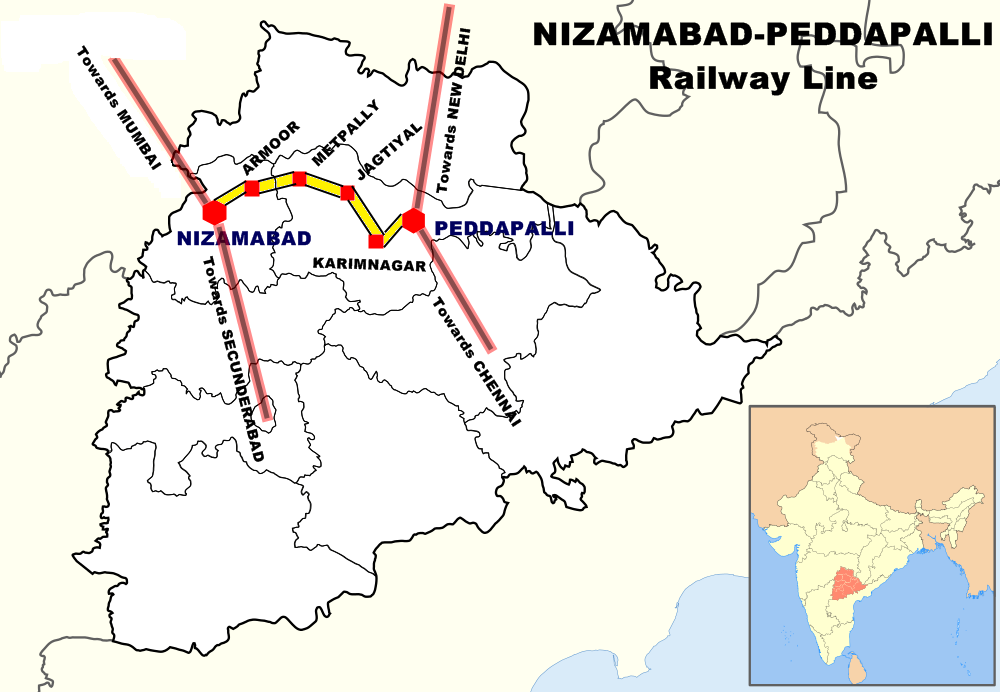
Nizamabad Jn. Location

Nizamabad railway station is a junction connecting northern, southern and western India lines. It is situated on Secunderabad (Kacheguda)-Manmad railway line and is also the convergence station for Peddapalli–Karimnagar–Nizamabad line via Armoor which was inaugurated on 25 March 2017 with a DEMU service between Nizamabad and Karimnagar. This section is a part of Delhi–Chennai line which is known as Grand Trunk Route. This 180 km (110 mi) long line also reduced the distance the between major Indian cities such as Hyderabad–New Delhi, Mumbai–Karimnagar, Nizamabad–Warangal.

Jankampet Jn. is another station located in western part of the city. This station also lies on Secunderabad (Kacheguda)–Manmad railway line and acts as the junction point for Jankampet-Bodhan railway line in Nizamabad district. Indian Railways also has plans for extending the railway line from Bodhan to Latur Road and Bidar which in turn will pave way for Nizamabad and Karimnagar to have direct connectivity to Latur, Bidar, Gulbarga, Solapur, Miraj and many other cities of the neighbouring states of Maharashtra and Karnataka.

In October 2023, the Karimnagar-Nizamabad MEMU was extended up to Bodhan.

== Classification and performance ==
Nizamabad is classified as an A–category station, in terms of earnings. It has been selected for the Adarsh Station Scheme, a scheme for upgradation of stations by the Indian Railways.

== Structure and amenities ==
The zonal railway has identified the station for development of Multi Functional Complex adjoining to the station building. The proposed Multi Functional Complex will provide state of the art facilities to the passengers and public at large which shall include services like, food courts, quick service restaurants, cloak rooms, hotels with banquet hall, stores, medical outlets, state of the art, dormitories etc. As of June 2015, P.K.Srivastava the General Manager of Hyderabad Division along with Ms. K.Kavitha, Hon’ble Member of Parliament of Nizamabad have inaugurated several passenger amenities/facilities including Automatic Ticket Vending Machines facility (ATVM), foundation for development of Nizamabad station.

== See also ==
- List of railway stations in India
