= Komrelly Mallanna Temple =

Hindu temple in Telangana, India

Komuravelli Mallanna Temple
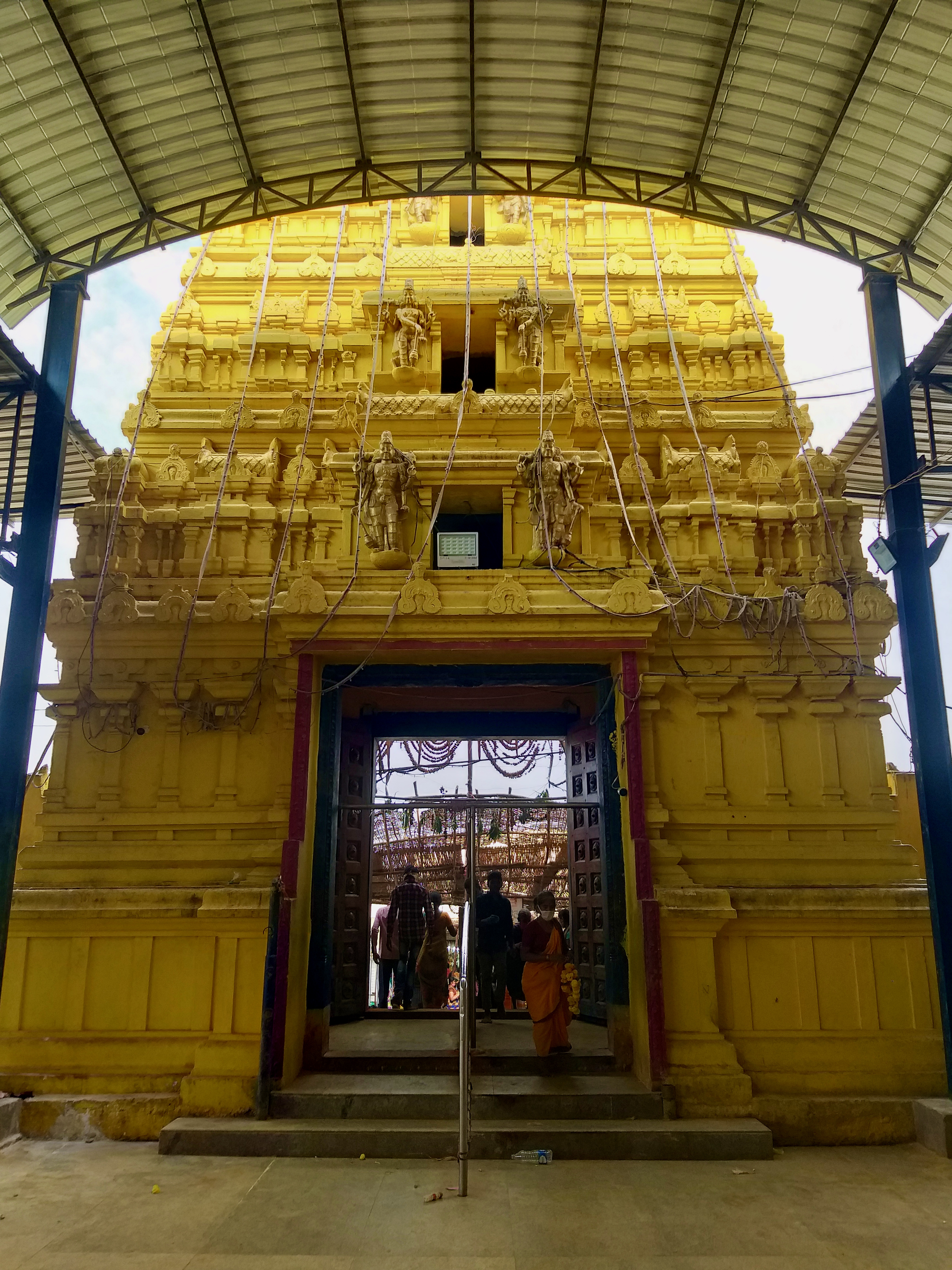

- Location in Telangana

Religion
- Affiliation: Hinduism
- District: Siddipet
- Deity: Mallikarjuna Swamy (Shiva)/ Khandoba
- Festivals: Maha Shivaratri, Ugadi

Location
- Location: Komuravelli village and mandal
- State: Telangana
- Country: India
- Coordinates: 17.9300°N 78.8963°E

Architecture
- Temple: 1

The Komuravelli Mallanna Swamy Temple is a Hindu temple located on a hill in Komuravelli village of Siddipet district in Telangana state, India. It is located near Siddipet on SH–1 Rajiv Rahadari. The primary deity is Mallanna or Mallikarjuna Swamy, a form of Shiva. The deity is also called as Khandoba by the Maharashtrian people. The temple is located about 85 kilometers from Hyderabad. In 2026, the state government opened the Komuravelli railway station to ensure easy access to the temple. The station is part of the Kothapalli–Manoharabad line.

== Komuravelli Mallanna Temple ==
Mallanna along with his consorts Golla Kethamma, and Medalamma, are at the main temple. The Oggu Katha singers sing the tale of Mallanna here. Devotees offer prayers to Mallanna with the help of Oggu Pujaris who draw a rangoli called as Patnam ( A form of offering prayers to Lord ) in front of Lord Mallanna inside temple and also in temple's verandah.

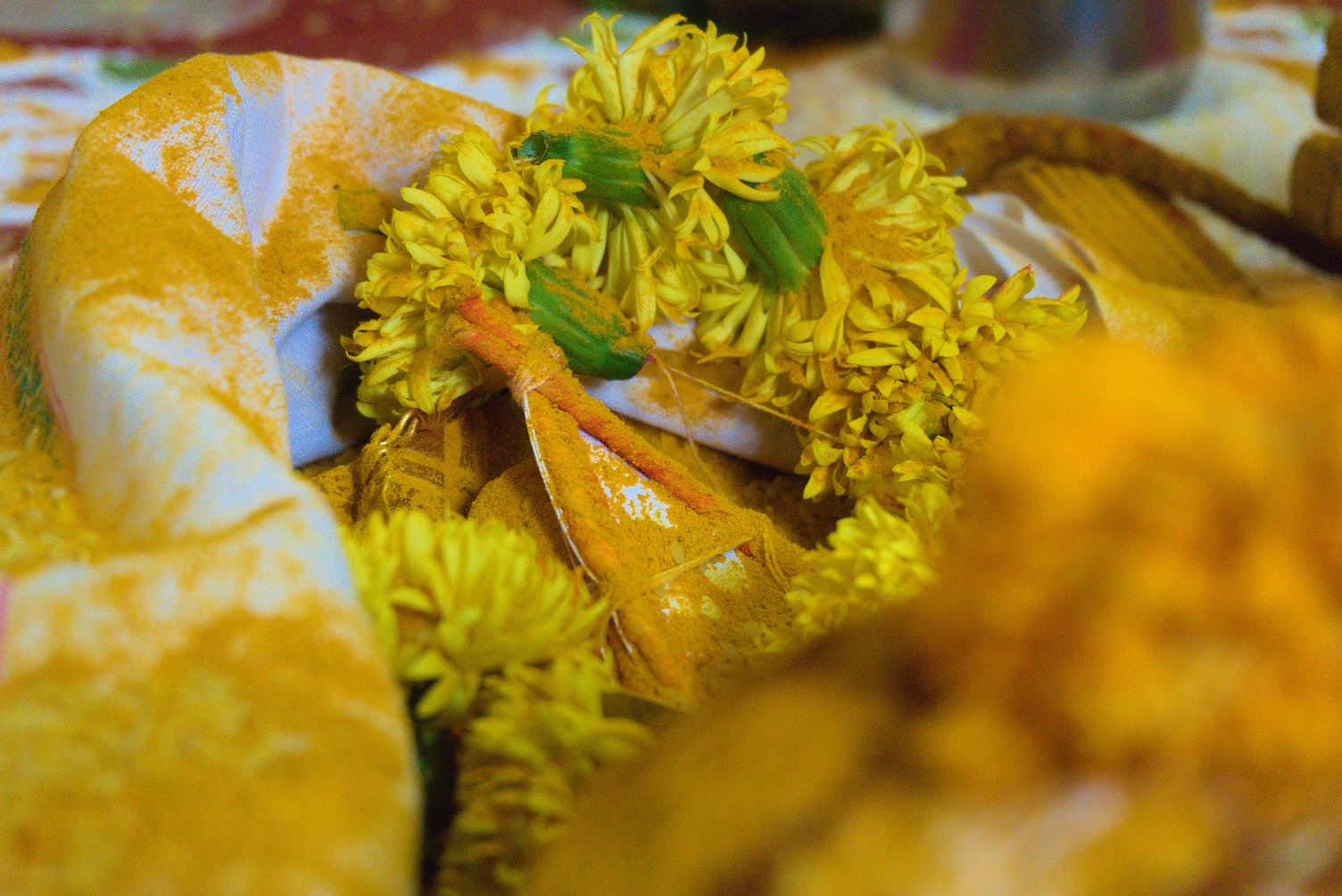
Mallanna Swamy Idol

Large number of devotees visit the Mallanna temple during Maha Shivaratri when the Pedda Patnam is celebrated and also during the Agni Gundaalu which is celebrated on the Sunday falling before the Ugadi. The festive season, called as Mallanna Jatara begins from Sankranti and lasts till Ugadi. Large number of devotees offer prayers to the deity on all Sundays which falls in between Sankranti and Ugadi.

Another temple, Konda Pochamma temple is nearby which is visited by the devotees who visit Mallanna temple.

== Priesthood and Ritual Traditions ==
The ritual structure of the temple is characterized by a unique dual priesthood system that reflects a synthesis of scriptural Veerashaiva traditions and regional pastoral folk culture. This dual arrangement is directly tied to the temple's core mythology, which dictates that Lord Mallanna married two consorts: Kethamma, from the Golla/Yadava community, and Medalamma, a princess from the Linga Balija community.

- Inner Sanctum (Garbhagriha) Priesthood: The main temple priests responsible for the inner sanctum rituals, daily pooja, and the preservation of the 500-year-old clay idol belong to the Linga Balija (Veerashaiva Lingayat) community. Following ancestral lineages and deeply rooted traditions, these priests wear the Ishtalinga around their necks and conduct daily services strictly in accordance with Veerashaiva codes of worship.
- Folk Rituals and Oggu Pujaris: Complementing the inner sanctum worship, external folk rituals, major festive offerings, and public celebrations are led by the Oggu Pujaris, who belong to the pastoral Kuruma and Yadava communities. They perform the Oggu Katha (traditional musical ballads narrating the life of Mallanna) and draw the massive, sacred Patnam (chromatic floor drawings made of turmeric and colored powders) during the annual Jatara season.

== Komuravelli Mallanna Temple Story ==
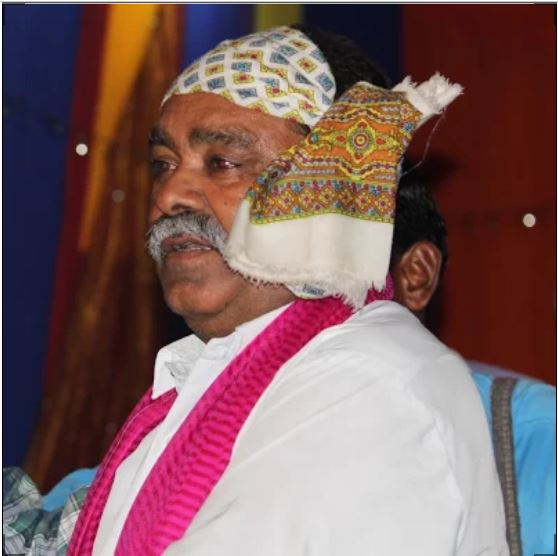
OgguKatha (Folk Story Teller ) Poodur (Kathala) Mallaiah

There is no written script for the Lord Mallanna story. The story of Mallanna is sung in "Oggu Katha". In this Oggu katha, Swamy Mallanna married goddess Medallamma by facing conditions which are put up by her brothers. Goddess Medallamma is also called as Bramarambika, who is consort of Lord Shiva.

Also, in a recent offering from "Devon Ke Dev...Mahadev" mythological daily show on LifeOk TV channel, it has been shown that, Mallanna resembles to Marthand/Khandoba, an incarnation of Lord Shiva. Sujitkumar phulari
