= Manoharabad railway station =

Railway station in Manoharabad, India

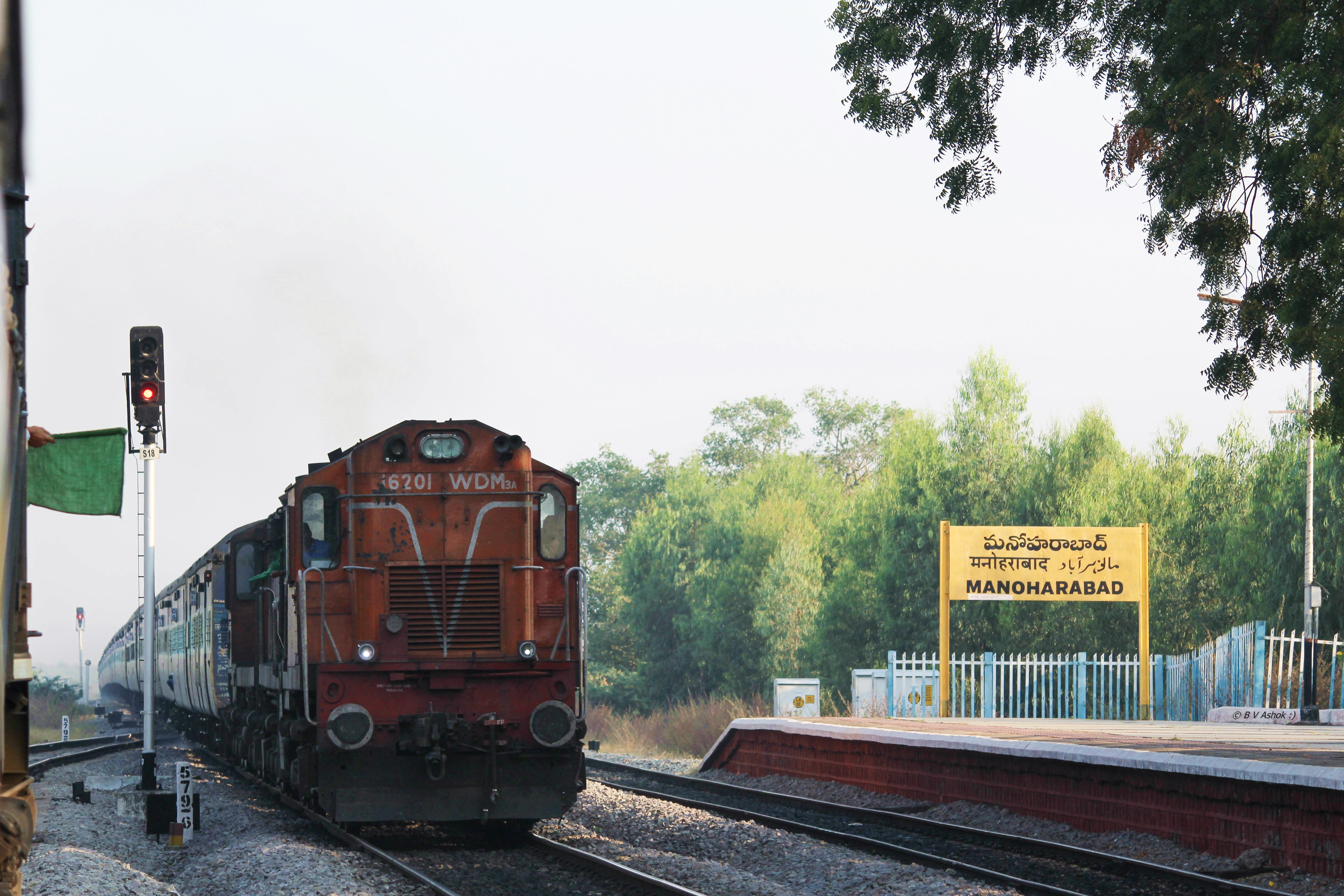
- Ajanta Express at the Manoharabad railway station

General information
- Location: Railway Road Manoharabad, Telangana; India
- Coordinates: 17.7548988°N 78.4553962°E
- Elevation: 265 metres (869 ft)
- System: Indian Railways station
- Owner: Indian Railways
- Operator: South Central Railway zone.
- Lines: Kothapalli–Manoharabad line Secunderabad-Manmad line
- Platforms: 2
- Tracks: 4

Construction
- Structure type: Standard (on ground)
- Parking: Yes

Other information
- Status: Functioning
- Station code: MOB
- Zone(s): South Central Railway zone
- Division(s): Hyderabad
Location
- Location within Telangana Location within India

Manoharabad railway station (station code MOB) is a railway station in Manoharabad of Medak District. It serves the city of Manoharabad in Telangana State, India. It comes under Hyderabad division of South Central Railway.

== Overview ==
The railway has emerged as an important link in Telangana's railway map. It helps to connect Karimnagar, Siddipet and Rajanna Sircilla Districts to Hyderabad via the Kothapalli-Manoharabad railway line.

The Manoharabad station is of crucial importance for both northern Telangana and the 700,000 plus people of the Medak District. The line provides the people with medical access in Hyderabad, pilgrims access to the ancient Raja Rajeswara Temple in Vemulawada etc.

== See also ==
- Kothapalli-Manoharabad section
- South Central Railways
