= Vemulawada, Rajanna Sircilla district =

Vemulawada
- Town Hindu Pilgrimage
- Nickname: Emulaada
- Location in Telangana, India Vemulawada (India)
- Coordinates: 18°28′N 78°53′E
- Country: India
- State: Telangana
- District: Rajanna Sircilla district
- Founder: Chalukyas

Government
  - Type: Municipal council
  - Body: Vemulawada Municipal Council; Vemulawada Temple Area Development Authority

Area
  - Total: 28.89 km^{2} (11.15 sq mi)

Population (2011)
  - Total: 33,706
  - Density: 1,167/km^{2} (3,022/sq mi)

Languages
  - Official: Telugu
- Time zone: UTC+5:30 (IST)
- PIN: 505302
- Lok Sabha constituency: Karimnagar
- Assembly constituency: Vemulawada
- Website: http://www.vemulawadatemple.org

Vemulawada is a census town in Rajanna Sircilla district of the Indian state of Telangana. It is the headquarters of Vemulawada Mandal and Revenue Division. A Hindu pilgrimage site, it served as the capital of the Chalukyas of Vemulavada during the 8th-10th centuries.

== History ==
Vemulawada was the capital of Vemulawada Chalukyas, that ruled present day Telangana, parts of Andhra Pradesh, Karnataka and Maharashtra between 7th and 10th centuries CE. The Chalukya inscriptions call the town "Lembula-pātaka"; "Lemulavada" is another historical variant of the name.

== Temples ==
The town is a Hindu pilgrimage site, notable for the Sri Raja Rajeshwara Swamy temple, which is also known as "Dakshina Kashi" ("Southern Kashi"), and which was constructed between 760 and 973 CE. It also hosts the temples of Bheemeshwara, Nagareshwara and Pochamma.

The town attracts large number of pilgrims from South India as well as Maharashtra, Odisha and Chhattisgarh. Huge number of devotees throng the place during Maha Shivaratri and Sri Rama Navami. The famous floral festival of Telangana, Bathukamma is believed to have originated from this place.

== Transport ==
=== Road ===
State Highway 11 passes near this town.

=== Rail ===
Vemulawada is connected to Hyderabad and Karimnagar via the Kothapalli-Manoharabad railway line. Also part of the railway line are Sircilla, Siddipet, Gajwel, etc.

== Notable people ==
- Chalukyas of Vemulavada
- Malliya Rechana
- Vemulawada Bheemakavi
