= Karimnagar mandal =

Karimnagar mandal కరీంనగర్ మండలం
- Mandal
- Location in Telangana, India
- Country: India
- State: Telangana
- District: Karimnagar
- Headquarters: Karimnagar

Government
  - Body: Mandal Parishad

Population (2011)
  - Total: 363,106

Languages
  - Official: Telugu
- Time zone: UTC+5:30 (IST)

Karimnagar mandal is one of the mandal in Karimnagar district of the Indian state of Telangana. It is under the administration of Karimnagar revenue division and the headquarters are located at Karimnagar.

== Government and politics ==
Karimnagar mandal is the only mandal under Karimnagar assembly constituency, which in turn represents Karimnagar lok sabha constituency of Telangana Legislative Assembly.

== Towns and villages ==
As of 2011 census, the mandal has 30 settlements. It includes 2 towns and 28 villages.

The settlements in the mandal are listed below:

- Arepalle (OG)
- Asifnagar
- Baddipalle
- Bommakal (OG)
- Chamanpalle
- Chegurti
- Cherlabuthkur
- Chintakunta (OG) (Part)
- Chintakunta (Part)
- Durshed
- Elbotharam
- Elgandal
- Fakeerpet
- Hasnapur
- Irukulla
- Jublinagar
- Kamanpur
- Karimnagar (M)
- Khazipur
- Kothapalle(Haveli)
- Lakshmipur
- Malkapur
- Maqdumpur
- Nagunur
- Pothgal
- Rekurthi (CT)
- Sitarampur (OG)
- Taharakondapur
- Wallampahad
- Arepalle (Part)

Note: M-Municipality, CT–Census town, OG–Out growth

== See also ==
- List of mandals in Telangana
