= Peddapalli–Nizamabad line =

Railway in Telangana, India

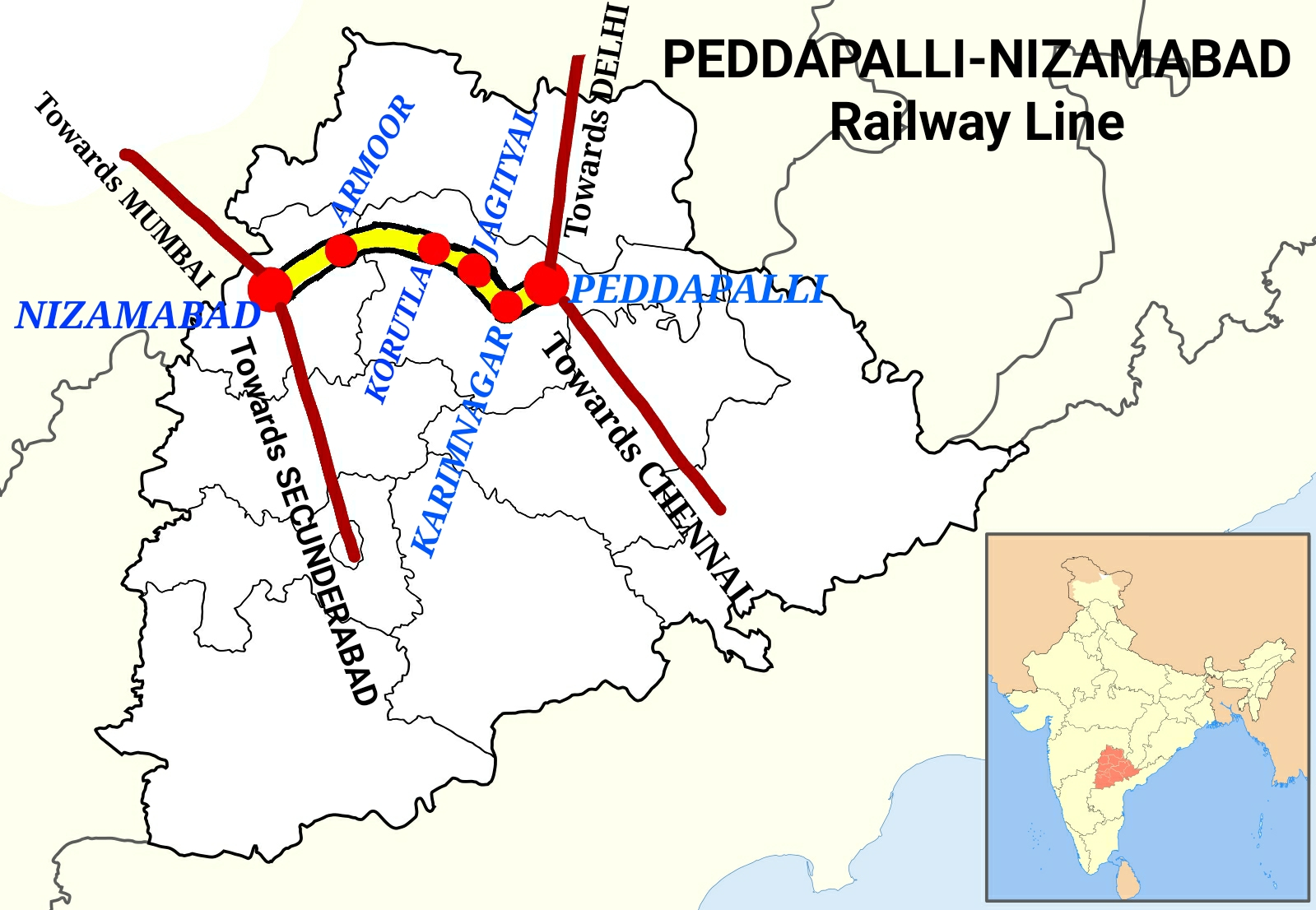
- Route map of Peddapalli–Nizamabad Railway line

Overview
- Status: Operational
- Owner: Indian Railways
- Locale: Telangana
- Termini: Peddapalli Junction; Nizamabad Junction
- Stations: 16
- Website: scr.indianrailways.gov.in

Service
- Type: electric railway line
- System: Single Electric Railway Line
- Services: Delhi–Chennai line Secunderabad–Manmad line Kothapalli-Manoharabad line
- Operator: South Central Railway zone

History
- Work began: 1993
- Opened: 25-Mar-2017; 9 years ago

Technical
- Line length: 177 km (110 mi)
- Track gauge: 5 ft 6 in (1,676 mm) broad gauge
- Electrification: Single-line overhead catenary
- Operating speed: 110 km/h (68 mph)
Route map
Peddapalli–Nizamabad railway line highlighted in red

Peddapalli–Nizamabad line is a single-track broad-gauge railway line in the Indian state of Telangana. It connects Nizamabad and Peddapalli in South Central Railway zone. It reduces the distance between Nizamabad, Karimnagar and Warangal. Peddapalli is located on Kazipet–Balharshah section of Delhi–Chennai line, known as Grand Trunk line and Nizamabad is located on Secunderabad–Manmad line. The line roughly follows National Highway 63 from Jagtial to Nizamabad.

== History ==
Peddapalli–Karimnagar–Nizamabad railway line (177 km) was sanctioned by the late Shri.P.V. Narasimha Rao who was the 10th Prime Minister of India in the year of 1993. It took 24 years to be completed in a phased manner.

The section between Peddapalli and Karimnagar was completed and services were started in 2001. It took another 6 years to complete the stretch between Karimnagar and Jagityal. Passenger trains were extended till Jagityal from 2007. On 29 December 2016 upon the completion of railway tracks between Jagityal and Mortad, the DEMU trains were further extended till Morthad mandal of Nizamabad district and passenger trains began moving between Karimnagar–Morthad and Peddapalli–Jagityal.

After the fund allocation for the remaining section between Morthad and Nizamabad, the works were accelerated and within a year the Peddapalli–Nizamabad line via Karimnagar was ready for operations and the services began from 25 March 2017, it took 3.5 years to electrify the complete line, started in 2018 Oct and completed in 24 Feb 2022. The overall stretch took nearly 28 years in total to complete along with single electric line.

In the near future, passengers can link to this line once the Kothapalli-Manoharabad line is complete, via Kothapalli (Karimnagar).

In October 2023, the Karimnagar-Nizamabad MEMU was extended up to Bodhan.

In 2025, the Pedapalli Bypass 2kms line opened, it allows freight and other trains traveling from Karimnagar toward Warangal to avoid going further north to the main Pedapalli station, saving 45 minutes of travel time.

== Stations ==
- Peddapalli Junction (PDPL)
- Sultanabad (STBD)
- Peddapalli Bypass (PDLB)
- Karimnagar (KRMR)
- Kothapalli Jn (KPHI)
- Gangadhara (GDRA)
- Podur (PUDR)
- Mallial Nukapalli (NPML)
- Lingampet–Jagityal(LPJL)
- Medipalli (MDPLI)
- Koratla (KRLA)
- Metpally(MTPI)
- Mortad (MRTD)
- Anksapur (AKSP)
- Armoor (ARMR)
- Mamidipalle (MMDPL)
- Nizamabad Junction (NZB)

== Electrification ==
Full electrification of the line was completed on 24 February, 2022.

== Passenger trains ==
- Tirupati–Karimnagar–Tirupati Biweekly SF Express (12761/12762)
- Kacheguda–Peddapalli Junction–Kacheguda DEMU Express Special (07793/07794)
- Karimnagar–Sirpur Town–Karimnagar MEMU Express Special (07765/07766)
- Nizamabad–Karimnagar–Nizamabad MEMU Express Special (07893/07894)
- 07195/07196 - Dadar Central–Kazipet Junction Express
