= Kothapalli–Manoharabad line =

Railway line in Telangana, India

Kothapalli-Manoharabad line
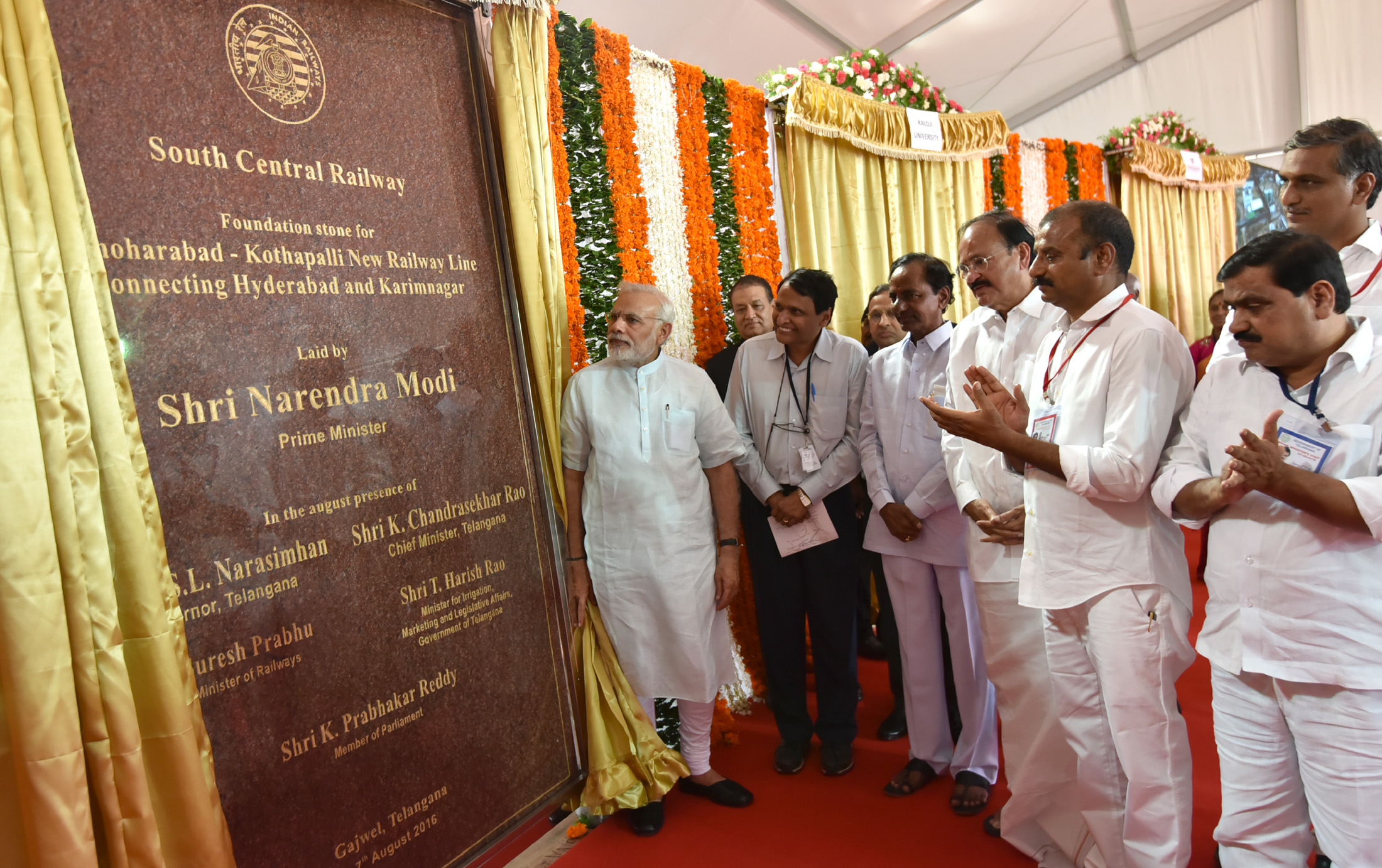
- Kothapalli-Manoharabad railway foundation stone ceremony

Overview
- Status: Partially Operational
- Owner: Indian Railways
- Locale: Telangana
- Termini: Manoharabad; Kottapalli
- Stations: 15
- Website: scr.indianrailways.gov.in

Service
- System: Single Diesel Railway Line
- Services: Delhi–Chennai line Secunderabad–Manmad line Peddapalli-Nizambad line
- Operator: South Central Railway zone

History
- Work began: 2016
- Opened: 2027; 1 year's time Manoharabad-Siddipet section 3 October 2023; 3 years ago

Technical
- Line length: 151 km (94 mi)
- Track gauge: 5 ft 6 in (1,676 mm) broad gauge
- Electrification: NA
- Operating speed: 100 km/h (62 mph)
Route map
Kothapalli-Manoharabad railway line highlighted in red

The Kothapalli–Manoharabad line is a single-track broad-gauge railway line under construction in the Indian state of Telangana. Its purpose is to reduce the distance from Karimnagar to Hyderabad and provide railway connectivity to districts such as Siddipet and Sircilla. The line will connect Manoharabad to Kothapally in the South Central Railway zone, Hyderabad Division.

The line follows State Highway 17 from Manoharabad until it reaches Gajwel where it begins to follow State Highway 1 until Siddipet. It continues north to Sircilla, to allow easy access to the Raja Rajeswara Temple, Vemulawada and following National Highway 365B. The line terminates at Kottapalli, which is near National Highway 563 and connections to Pedapalli-Nizambad line.

The line when fully completed will carry both cargo/freight and passengers. In cargo, products like cement, coal, agricultural, and industrial handloom will be the main focus, although this may expand if e-commerce giants like Amazon India decide to also use the line to ship products to customers. The bid tender for the final leg of the line (between Sircilla and Kothapalli) opened in September 2026 with a estimated completion of 30 months.

== History ==
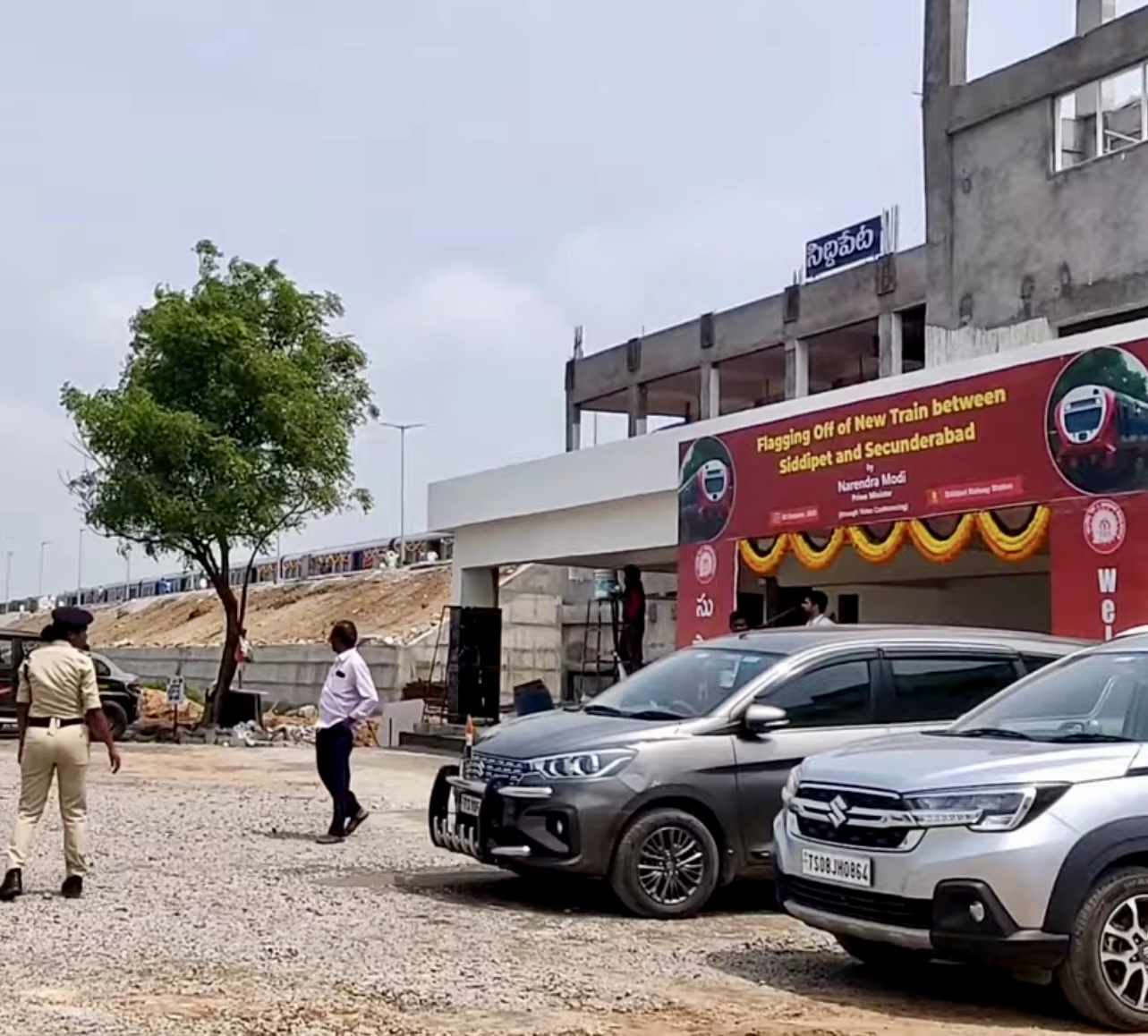
Siddipet Station - opened in 2023

The Survey work for the line was reportedly completed sometime in 2005. After the formation of Telangana, the line was fast-tracked and received Centre approval. The foundation stone was laid on 8 August 2016 by Prime Minister Narendra Modi.

=== Phase 1 ===
In 2020, track on this line was tested to Gajwel. On 29 June 2022, the railway line from Manoharabad to Kothapalli received its first freight shipment at Gajwel. In 2023, Rs 185 crores were allocated to the project in the Union Budget. This was estimated to fund the line to Sircilla. The Manoharabad - Siddipet portion of the line was inaugurated on 3 October 2023 with a Secunderabad-Siddipet DEMU service. The remaining work, from Siddipet to Kothapalli, was to be completed by 2026.

=== Phase 2 ===
In 2024, 350 crores were allocated to the project in the Union Budget. State official Bandi Sanjay reported that the line would be completed by 2027.

Sircilla railway station construction began in 2025, on the outskirts of Sircilla between Gopalraopally and Thangallapally. In 2026, the Railway bridge spanning the Manair River at the Mid-Manair backwaters near Sircilla began construction. The bridge is a major part of the final phase of the project, allowing for completion of the line from Sircilla-Kothapalli. In July 2026, the Komuravelli railway station was inaugurated connecting a historic Hindu temple site.

== Stations ==
Stations include:

- Manoharabad (MOB)
- Nacharam (NCRM)
- Appaipally (APMR)
- Iranagaram (IRNGR)
- Gajwel (GJWL)
- Kodakandla (KDKLA)
- Lakhadaram (LKDRM)
- Komuravelli Punyakshetram (KIPK)
- Duddeda (DUDDA)
- Siddipet (SIPT)
- Gurralagondi (GRLND)
- Chinnalingapur (CHLNG)
- Sircilla (SRCLA)
- Vemulawada, Rajanna Sircilla (VMLWD)
- Boinpalli(BNPLI)
- Wedira (WEDRA)
- Kothapalli Jn (KPHI)

== Gallery ==
Sircilla, Telangana - Manair River Railway Bridge Construction (2026)

Komuravelli Telangana (est. 16th century)

Raja Rajeswara Temple, Vemulawada

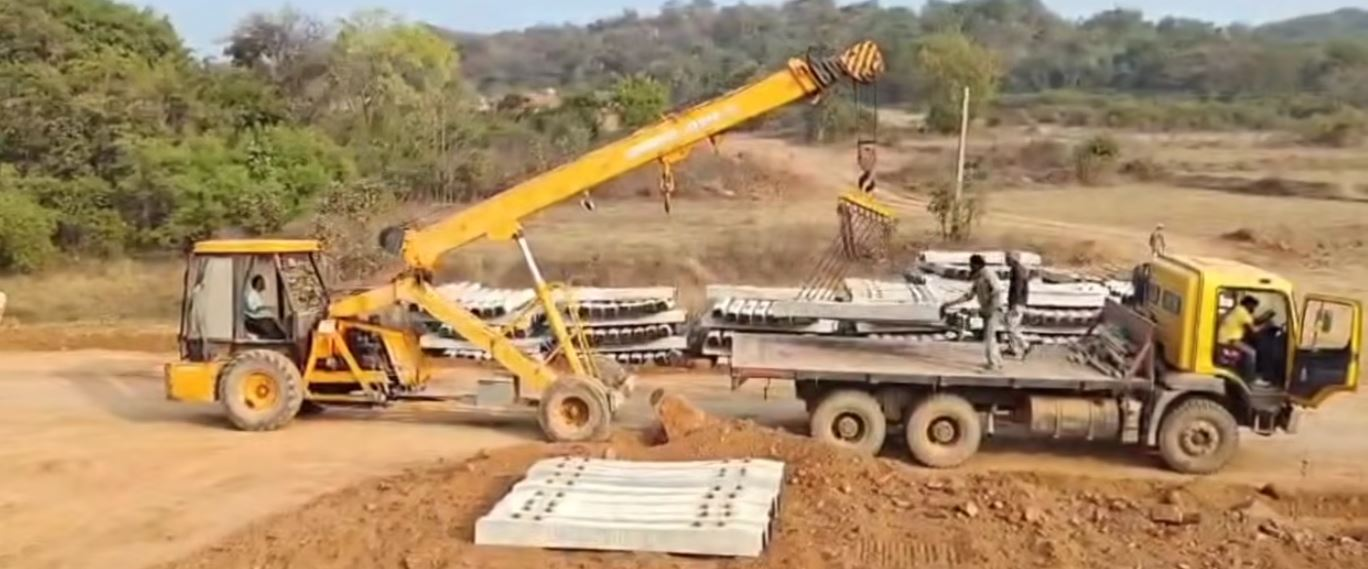
Railway sleepers installation work on the Siddipet-Sircilla segment of the Kothapalli-Manoharabad railway line (2025)

Panorama of Chinnalingapur, Telangana railway station(2026)

Sircilla Railway Station (2026)
