= Kottapalli railway station =

Railway station in Telangana, India

Kothapalli Junction
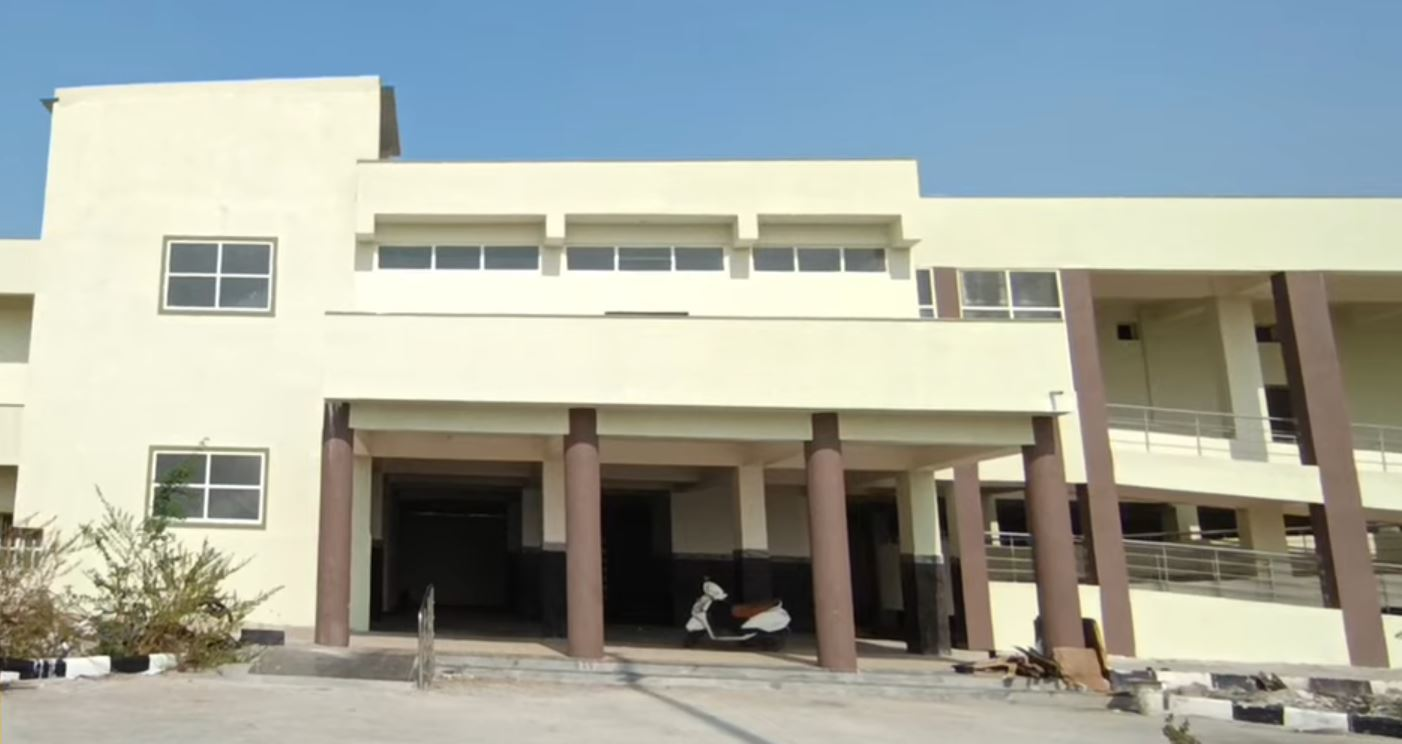

General information
- Location: Kothapalli, Karimnagar, Telangana; India
- Coordinates: 18.510454742237823°N 79.08700033482575°E
- Elevation: 265 m (869 ft)
- System: Indian Railways station
- Owner: Indian Railways
- Operator: South Central Railway zone.
- Lines: Peddapalli–Karimnagar–Nizamabad railway line Kothapalli-Manoharabad railway line
- Platforms: 3
- Tracks: 6

Construction
- Parking: Yes
- Accessible: Disabled access

Other information
- Status: Functioning
- Station code: KPHI
- Zone(s): South Central Railway zone
- Division(s): Secunderabad
- Classification: Non-Suburban Grade-5 (NSG-5)

History
- Opened: 2007; 19 years ago
- Rebuilt: May-2025; 16 months ago
- Electrified: Yes 18-Feb-2019; 7 years ago

Passengers
- Normal

Services
Preceding station	Indian Railways	Following station
Gangadara towards ?	Peddapalli–Nizamabad section	Karimnagar towards ?
Location
- Location within Telangana Location within India

Kothapalli Junction railway station is a neighbourhood station of Karimnagar, the station is located in Kothapalli (Haveli) in the state of Telangana, India. National Highway 563 runs through this area. It is located on Karimnagar-Jagitial section of Peddapalli–Nizamabad line.

There is a construction going on for a Kothapalli-Manoharabad railway line. Kothapalli is a Municipality. It is 8 km away from the district headquarters, Karimnagar, on the Karimnagar–Jagitial–Nizamabad road which is also known as NH 563 and NH 63. In 2024, a new station building was constructed as part of the new Kothapalli-manoharabad line work.
