= National Highway 365B (India) =

India's national highway from Suryapet to Sircilla

National Highway 365B
- Map of the National Highway in red

Route information
- Length: 184 km (114 mi)

Major junctions
- South end: Suryapet
- North end: Siricilla

Location
- Country: India
- States: Telangana

Highway system
- Roads in India; Expressways; National; State; Asian
← NH 65	→ SH 11 (Telangana)

National Highway 365B, commonly called NH 365B is a national highway in India. It is a spur road of National Highway 65. NH-365B traverses the state of Telangana in India. It starts at Suryapet and ends at Sircilla. Major cities on this route are Suryapet, Jangaon, Siddipet and Sircilla.

== Route ==
Suryapet, Arvapally, Phanigiri, Thirumalagiri, Jangaon, Duddeda, Siddipet, Sircilla.

== Junctions ==
NH 65 Terminal near Suryapet.
NH 365 near Aravpally and Vangamarthy.
NH 163 near Jangaon.

Terminal with Telangana State Highway 11 at Sircilla.

== See also ==
- List of national highways in India
- List of national highways in India by state
