= Manoharabad =

Manoharabad Manoharabad Station
- Mandal
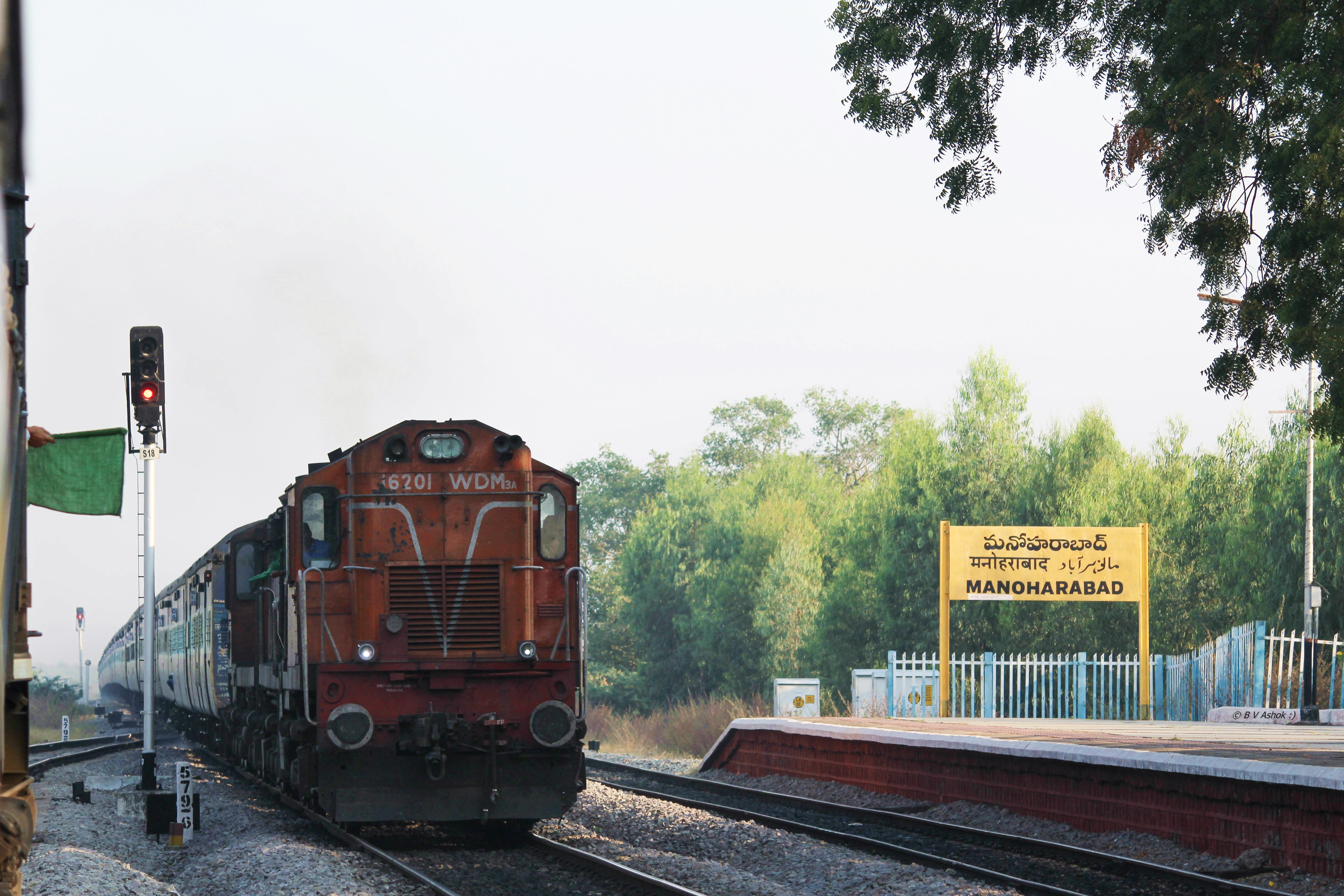
- Ajanta Express at Manoharabad Railway station

- Location in Telangana, India Manoharabad (India)
- Coordinates: 17.766496°N 78.468089°E
- Country: India
- State: Telangana
- District: Medak

Languages
  - Official: Telugu
- Time zone: UTC+5:30 (IST)
- Postal code: 502336
- Vehicle registration: TS 35
- Climate: hot (Köppen)
- Website: telangana.gov.in

Manoharabad is a Mandal of the Medak district, Telangana, India. its erstwhile name was YENNELLI-Harishankergoud Ramunigari also generally called as Manoharabad Station. it also coincides with the Name of Manoharabad a village in Jakranpally Mandal of Nizamabad district in Telangana.

== Economy ==
ITC Limited opened a manufacturing facility in Manoharabad in 2023.

== Transport ==
National Highway 44 passes through this town.

=== Rail ===
Manoharabad has an existing railway station with code (MOB) and is an important part of the new Kothapalli-Manoharabad line connecting various districts and towns such as Karimnagar, Sircilla, Siddipet, Gajwel, etc to Hyderabad. The line is estimated to be completed in 2025.

The Manoharabad - Siddipet portion of the line was inaugurated on 3 October, 2023 with a regular Secunderabad-Siddipet DEMU train service.
