= South Central Railway zone =

One of the 17 railway zones in India

South Central Railway

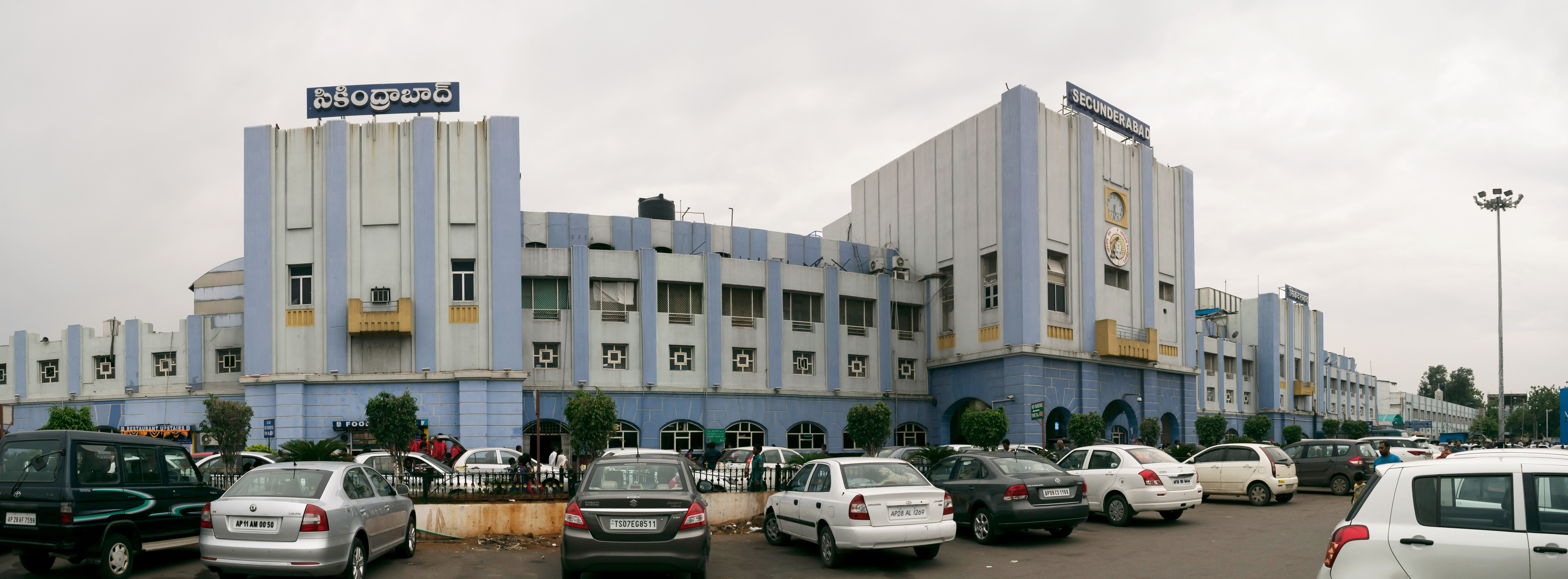
- SCR's largest station, the Secunderabad Railway Station

Overview
- Headquarters: Rail Nilayam, Secunderabad
- Locale: Andhra Pradesh, Telangana, Maharashtra, Karnataka
- Dates of operation: 2 October 1965; 60 years ago–
- Predecessor: Southern Railway zone Central Railway zone

Technical
- Track gauge: Broad gauge
- Length: 3,572 km (2,220 mi)

Other
- Website: https://scr.indianrailways.gov.in/

The South Central Railway (abbreviated SCR) is one of the 19 zones of Indian Railways. The jurisdiction of the zone is spread over the states of Andhra Pradesh, Telangana, Maharashtra, Karnataka. It has three divisions under its administration, which include Secunderabad, Hyderabad and Nanded. Secunderabad, Telangana is the Zonal headquarter.

== History ==
Ex MP Bayya Suryanarayana Murthy requested the creation of a new railway zone.

The zone was formed on 2 October 1965 by merging the carved-out divisions of Hubli, Vijayawada of Southern Railway zone and Solapur, Secunderabad of Nizam's Guaranteed State Railway. On 2 October 1977, Guntakal division of Southern Railway zone was merged and the already merged division of Solapur was demerged from the zone and became part of its former Central Railway zone. On 17 February 1978, the Hyderabad division was formed by splitting the existing Secunderabad railway division. On 1 April 2002, two new divisions of Guntur and Nanded were created in this zone and the Hubli division was demerged and became part of South Western Railway zone. The Khandwa Akola section was merged into Bhusaval Division of Central Railways as the line was taken up for Gauge Conversion in 2017. On 27 February 2019, AP part of Waltair Division, Vijayawada, Guntur and Guntakal divisions were merged into newly formed South Coast Railway zone.

== Jurisdiction ==
The zone is spread over the states of Telangana, Maharashtra, Andhra Pradesh, Karnataka, Partly Southern Madhya Pradesh near Khandwa.

== Divisions ==
- Secunderabad railway division
- Hyderabad railway division
- Nanded railway division

== Infrastructure ==
=== Workshops ===
The zone has mechanical workshops at Mettuguda and Lallaguda.

The Carriage Workshop at Lallaguda was established in 1893. It was then known as the Locomotive, Carriage and Wagon Workshop of the Nizam State Railway (NSR) and renamed as Carriage workshop in 1997. Restored wagons, coaches and a variety of artefacts related to railway history are displayed at the workshop.

=== Sheds ===
The zone has diesel loco sheds at Kazipet and Moula Ali. The zone has electric loco sheds at Lallaguda(Secunderabad) and Kazipet. The zone has one EMU Car shed at Moula Ali EMU.

=== Depots ===
The zone has Passenger coach care depots at Hyderabad, Secunderabad, Kacheguda, Kazipet, Nanded and Purna. Additionally, Ramagundam, Bellampally have wagon maintenance depots.

=== Training institutes ===
The zone has training institutes for imparting and learning railway techniques serving both Indian as well foreign railway staff at Secunderabad, Kazipet and Washim.

=== Healthcare ===
Railway Hospitals located in these areas Div. Hospitals at Secunderabad, Kazipet and Nanded have healthcare facilities serving exclusively for the employees of Indian railways and their families.

== Loco sheds ==
- Electric Loco Shed, Lallaguda
- Electric Loco Shed, Kazipet
- Diesel Loco Shed, Moula Ali
- Diesel Loco Shed, Kazipet

== Routes ==
- Delhi-Chennai main line (a diagonal of the golden quadrilateral Grand trunk route) connecting north-south regions.
- Balharshah Jn-Kazipet Jn- Kondapalli (end points excluded).
- KazipetJn- Secunderabad Jn-wadi Jn(excl) connecting delhi-chennai line to Mumbai-Chennai line
- ManmadJn- Hazur Sahib Nanded-SecunderabadJn- DhoneJn
- PeddapalliJn- NizamabadJn
- Dornakal Junction - Bhadrachalam Road - Manuguru
- Bethampudi Junction(Bhadrachalam Road) - Sathupalli
- Manoharabad Junction - Kothapalli Junction
- Devarakadra Junction - Krishna Junction
- Gadwal Junction - Raichur Junction
- Janakampet Junction - Bodhan
- Motumarri Junction - Vishnupuram Junction

== Major junctions ==
- Dornakal Jn
- Kazipet Jn.
- Mudkhed Jn.
- Nizamabad Jn.
- Parbhani Jn.
- Peddapalli Jn.
- Purna Jn.
- Secunderabad Jn.
- Vikarabad Jn.
- Manoharabad Jn.

== Projects ==
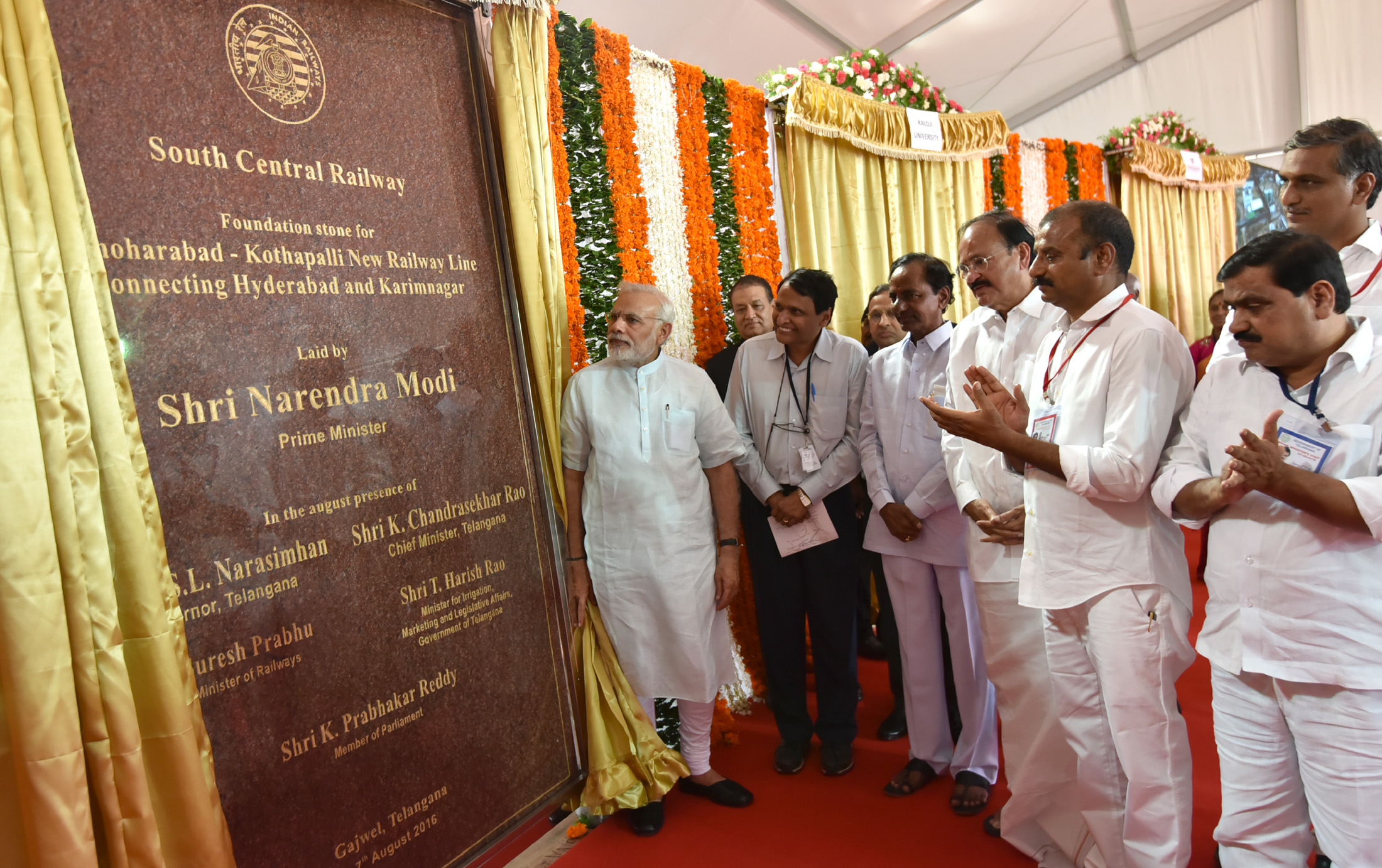
Kothapalli-Manoharabad railway foundation stone being laid

- Rail Manufacturing Unit, Kazipet
- The Manoharabad-Kothapally railway line, which connects Karimnagar to Manoharabad is currently under construction and is expected to be completed in 2025.
- Mahbubnagar-Munirabad new line, this line received funds in the 2023 Union Budget

== Performance and earnings ==
For FY 2024–25 first quarter, the zone operated an average of 315.44 mail/exp and 162.18 passenger trains on a daily basis. For the financial year 2023–24, the zone had grossed a record revenue of ₹20,339 crore (US$2.1 billion), an increase on 7% from the previous fiscal. It recorded passenger footfall of 262.62 million and earned ₹5,731.8 crore (US$600 million). While, the freight earnings stood at ₹13,620 crore (US$1.4 billion) by transporting 141.12 million tonnes.

SCR FY Gross Revenue
FY	Originating Gross Revenue	Freight Earnings	Originating Freight Loading	Originating Passenger Earnings	Originating Passengers Transported
2024–25	₹20,452 crore (US$2.1 billion)	₹13,825 crore (US$1.4 billion)			
2023–24	₹20,339 crore (US$2.1 billion)	₹13,620 crore (US$1.4 billion)	1591 MT	₹5,731.8 crore (US$600 million)	262.62 million
2022–23	₹18,976 crore (US$2.0 billion)		1512 MT	₹5,140.70 crore (US$530 million)	255.59 million
2021–22	₹14,266 crore (US$1.5 billion)		1418 MT		127.4 million

== Achievements ==
- For FY 2024–25, as part of ‘Mission Zero Scrap’, the zone earned a whopping ₹5,017.2 million (US$52 million) by the sale of scrap.
- In 2018, for the cleanliness category, it was ranked second among all railway zones in India.
- South Central Railway topped among all railway zones of India in terms of train punctuality and passenger earnings in 2016–17.
- The zone has become the first in the country to complete 100% LED lighting at all 733 stations under its jurisdiction.

== See also ==
- MMTS Hyderabad
- All India Station Masters' Association (AISMA)
- Nizam's Guaranteed State Railway
