= Gajwel =

- Town
- Gajwel–Pragnapur
- Location in Telangana, India Gajwel (India)
- Coordinates: 17.8517°N 78.6828°E
- Country: India
- State: Telangana
- District: Siddipet

Government
  - Type: Municipality
  - Body: Gajwel–Pragnapur Municipality
  - Member of Legislative Assembly: K. Chandrashekar Rao, BRS

Area
  - Town: 49.00 km^{2} (18.92 sq mi)
- Elevation: 568 m (1,864 ft)

Population (2011)
  - Town: 24,961
  - Density: 509.4/km^{2} (1,319/sq mi)
  - Metro: 35,000

Languages
  - Official: Telugu; Urdu
- Time zone: UTC+5:30 (IST)
- PIN: 502278
- Vehicle registration: TG 36
- Website: gajwelmunicipality.telangana.gov.in

Gajwel, officially Gajwel–Pragnapur, is a town and a municipality in Siddipet district of the Indian state of Telangana. The jurisdiction of the civic body is spread over an area of 49.00 km^{2} (18.92 mi^{2}). Gajwel, located about 53 km from Hyderabad on the Rajiv highway, is one of the fastest-developing towns in Telangana. It serves as a major political center and is the home constituency of the former Chief Minister of Telangana, K. Chandrashekar Rao. Gajwel has seen development in various sectors, including infrastructure projects like the Outer Ring Road (ORR) construction. The ORR, spanning approximately 21.92 kilometers, connects Gajwel with cities such as Hyderabad, Nagpur, Mumbai, Pune, and Nizamabad, improving connectivity and facilitating smoother travel.

== Geography ==
Gajwel is a town located in the Siddipet district of the Indian state of Telangana. It is situated approximately 53 kilometers northwest of the state capital, Hyderabad. Gajwel is positioned at a latitude of 17.8512° N and a longitude of 78.5902° E.

The town is located on the Deccan Plateau and is surrounded by agricultural lands. It lies at an average elevation of around 540 meters (1,770 feet) above sea level. The area is characterized by undulating terrain with scattered hills and valleys.

The region experiences a semi-arid climate, with hot summers and relatively mild winters. The summer season, which lasts from March to June, can be quite hot with temperatures often exceeding 40 degrees Celsius (104 degrees Fahrenheit). The monsoon season occurs from June to September, bringing moderate to heavy rainfall to the region. The winter season, from November to February, is relatively pleasant with temperatures ranging from 15 to 25 degrees Celsius (59 to 77 degrees Fahrenheit).

Gajwel is primarily an agricultural town with farming being the main occupation of the local population. The region is known for cultivating various crops such as paddy, cotton, maize, and vegetables.

== Industries ==
=== Amul ===
The mega Dairy Cooperative Society Amul has announced the setting up of their largest state-of-the-art plant at Wargal, Gajwel with an investment of Rs.500 crore. Amul selected Telangana to set up its largest plant in southern India with a capacity to process five lakh litres per day of milk expandable to 10 LLPD to manufacture packed milk and value-added dairy products such as curd, buttermilk, lassi, yogurt, paneer, sweets, among others.

=== ITC ===
Government is setting up special food processing zones in 10,000 acres of land, adding that one such zone over 1,400 acres is coming up in Gajwel.

== Economy ==
Gajwel's economy is primarily based on agriculture and allied activities. The region has fertile agricultural land, and farming is the main occupation of the local population. The town is known for cultivating crops such as paddy, cotton, maize, and vegetables.

In recent years, there has been a focus on modernizing agriculture and promoting agricultural practices that increase productivity and sustainability. The government has implemented various schemes and initiatives to support farmers, such as providing financial assistance, irrigation facilities, and access to technology and market linkages.

Apart from agriculture, there are also small-scale industries and businesses that contribute to Gajwel's economy. These include sectors like small-scale manufacturing, retail trade, and services. The town serves as a commercial center for the surrounding rural areas, providing goods and services to the local population.

As Gajwel is located in proximity to Hyderabad, the state capital, there is potential for economic development and growth through increased connectivity and infrastructure development. This could attract investments in industries, services, and tourism, further diversifying the local economy and creating employment opportunities.

Economic conditions change over time; current data can be obtained from official government agencies or local economic development organizations.

== Administration ==
Till 2012 Gajwel was a Panchayat and in the year 2012 it was upgraded as Nagara Panchayat vide G.O. No.34, dated: 251-01-2012, duly merging surrounding three (3) Gram panchayats i.e., 1. Pragnapur, 2. Mutrajapally and 3. Kyasaram Gram Panchayats and 5 numbers of hamlets namely Rajireddy Pally, Sangupally, Sangapur, Lingarajpet and Gundannapally in Medak District. Gajwel-Pragnapur Nagara Panchayath is spread over an area of 49.26sq. km. out of which about 6.3Sq km is habituated area and remaining area is vacant land . town is divided into 20 wards and elected body is in place to govern ULB.

== Politics ==
Gajwel Assembly constituency is a constituency of Telangana Legislative Assembly. It is one of 10 constituencies in Siddipet district. It consists of 6 mandals: Toopran, Kondapak, Gajwel, Jagadevpur, wargal, Markook and Mulug. Pendam Vasudev was the first MLA and J. B. Muthyal Rao was the second MLA of Gajwel. Gajwel Saidaiah, Allam Sailu, Sanjeeva Rao, Geetha Reddy, Vijaya Rama Rao, Sanjeeva Rao, Narsa Reddy. Gajwel Saidaiah won 4 times from 1962-1978. EX-Telangana Chief Minister K. Chandrashekar Rao is current MLA from Gajwel seat.

== Transport ==
=== Road ===
National Highway 161AA passes through Gajwel as well as State Highway 1 (Telangana). Gajwel has an Outer Ring Road (ORR), spanning 21.92 kilometers around Gajwel. The government invested ₹233 crores to build this state-of-the-art ORR, which will soon be operational. R&B officials are currently making preparations to commence its operation. Once it is opened to the public, it will help alleviate traffic issues. Currently, heavy trucks and containers from Gajwel city are being diverted to Hyderabad, Mumbai, Nagpur, Pune, Nizamabad, Sangareddy, and other regions through the Gajwel Ring Road, making transportation easier.

From Gajwel, along the Toopran route, a modern bus stand with model facilities and an estimated cost of ₹7.5 crores is being constructed by the government. Additionally, a railway station is being built at a kilometer's distance on the same route, and the concerned authorities are making efforts to expedite the functioning of the railway. This will enable the smooth operation of trains to major cities like Delhi, Bengaluru, Tirupati, and Chennai. Furthermore, there are ongoing efforts to construct additional tracks in this area to facilitate the implementation of more railway routes.

=== Rail ===
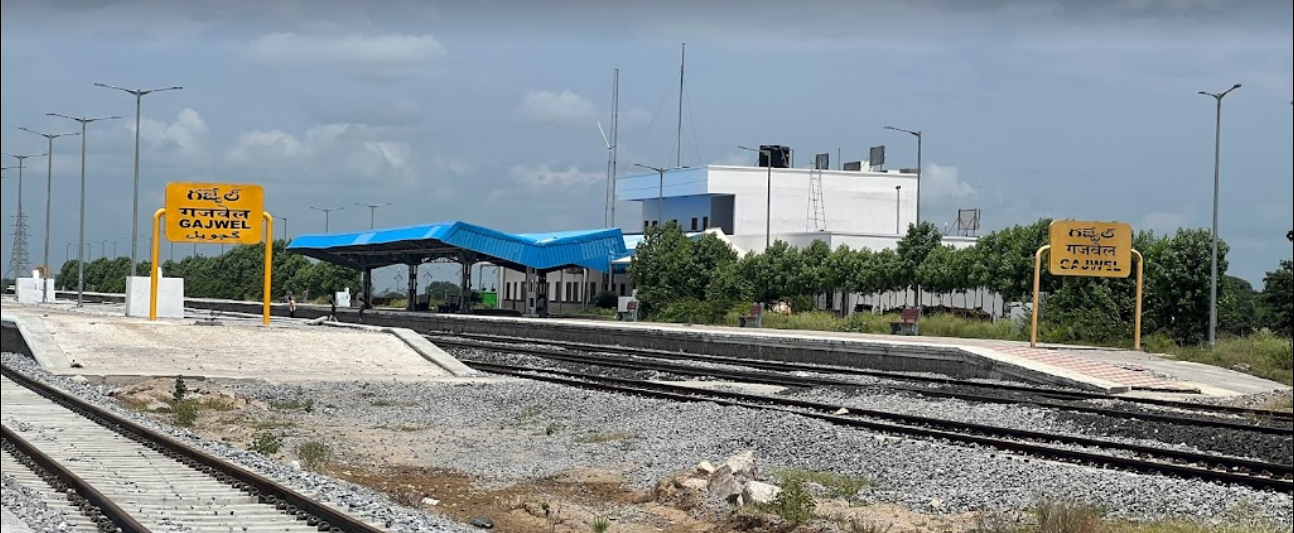
Railway station in Gajwel

Gajwel has a railway station and is a part of the Kothapalli-Manoharabad railway line. As of 2023, the construction is complete up until Siddipet, with the remaining work to Kothapalli to be completed by 2025. Once complete, Gajwel will be connected with Karimnagar, Sircilla, Siddipet, Manoharabad, Secundarabad etc.

The Manoharabad - Siddipet portion of the line was inaugurated on 3 October 2023 with a regular Secunderabad railway station-Siddipet DEMU train service.

=== Airway ===
The nearest Airport is Rajiv Gandhi International Airport at Shamshabad

Warangal Airport at Mamnoor along with Ramagundam Airport are the other two airports in the vicinity, however they are closed pending revival plans via UDAN scheme

== Awards ==
Gajwel has received the Pattana Pragathi award for best sanitation among towns with a population ranging from 25,000 to 50,000.
