= Electricity Commission =

Electricity Commission may refer to:

- Central Electricity Regulatory Commission (India)
  - State electricity regulatory commission (India)
    - Maharashtra Electricity Regulatory Commission
    - Odisha Electricity Regulatory Commission
    - Punjab State Electricity Regulatory Commission
    - Telangana State Electricity Regulatory Commission
- Electricity Commission (New Zealand)
- Electricity Commission (UK)
- Electricity Commission of New South Wales
- Electricity Supply Commission of Malawi
- Electricity and Gas Regulation Commission (Algeria)
- Federal Electricity Commission (Mexico)
- Nigerian Electricity Regulatory Commission
- State Electricity Commission (disambiguation), various entities
- State Electricity Commission of Victoria
- State Electricity Regulatory Commission (China)
- State Energy Commission of Western Australia
- Trinidad and Tobago Electricity Commission

== See also ==
- Electricity Authority (disambiguation)
