= Creg =

CREG is an acronym that can represent:

- Centres de recherche en gestion, a management research center based at Pau's University, France
- China Railway Engineering Equipment Group, a subsidiary of China Railway Group Limited
- China Recycling Energy Corporation (Nasdaq: CREG)
- Chongqing Road Engineering Group
- Electricity and Gas Regulation Commission, an Algerian public service organisation
- Electricity and Gas Regulation Commission (Belgium), a Belgian public service organisation

== See also ==
- CREG1 (Cellular Repressor of E1A-stimulated Genes 1)
- Craig (disambiguation)
