= State Electricity Commission =

State Electricity Commission can refer to:

- State Electricity Commission of Victoria, Australia
- State Electricity Commission of Western Australia
- State Electricity Commission of Queensland
- State Electricity Regulatory Commission (China)
- State electricity regulatory commission (India)
  - Maharashtra Electricity Regulatory Commission
  - Odisha Electricity Regulatory Commission
  - Punjab State Electricity Regulatory Commission
  - Telangana State Electricity Regulatory Commission

== See also ==
- Electricity Commission (disambiguation)
- State Electricity Board (disambiguation)
