= Administration of Hyderabad =

In Hyderabad, India, the Greater Hyderabad Municipal Corporation (GHMC) is in charge of the civic administration and infrastructure of the city. It was formed in April 2007 by merging 100 wards of the erstwhile Municipal Corporation of Hyderabad (MCH) with twelve municipalities of neighbouring two districts. GHMC covers an area of 650 km^{2} (250 sq mi), spread over the four districts—Hyderabad, Ranga Reddy, Medchal–Malkajgiri and Sangareddy. The GHMC is divided into five zones and eighteen circles that contain 150 municipal wards. Each ward is headed by a corporator, elected by popular vote. The corporators elect The City Mayor who is the titular head of GHMC. The executive powers of the GHMC lie with the Municipal Commissioner appointed by the Government of Telangana. The State Election Commission (SEC) monitors the municipal elections that are held in the city once in every five years. The first election of the GHMC were held in December 2009. The Indian National Congress alliance with Majlis Ittehadul Muslimeen formed the majority, with the agreement of sharing the mayor post equally between the two parties.

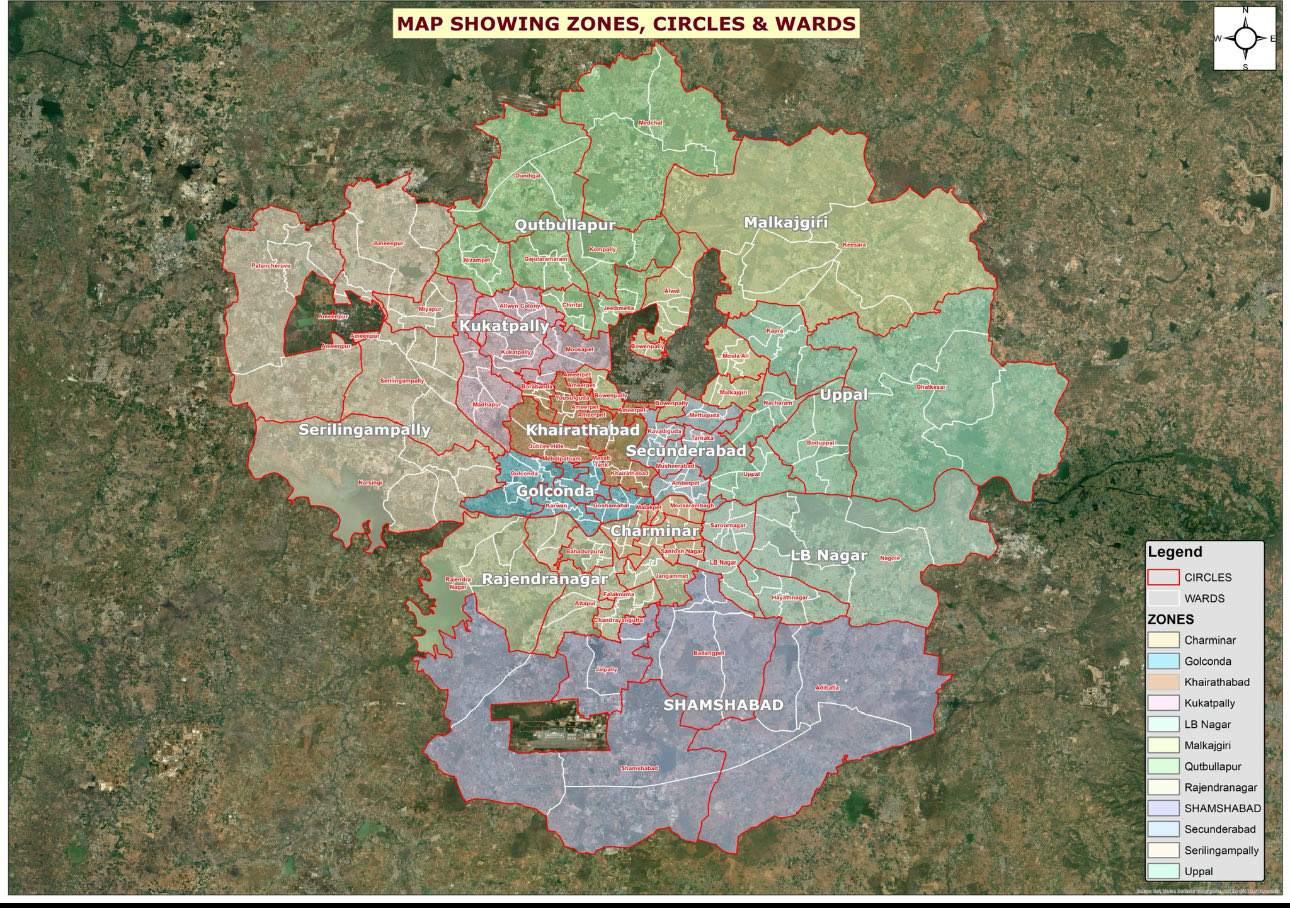
The GHMC is divided into six municipal zones

The Secunderabad Cantonment Board (SCB) an area of 40.1 km^{2} (15.5 sq mi), is a jurisdiction which contains some suburbs of Hyderabad and Secunderabad. The SCB area houses multiple camps of the Indian Army and Indian Air Force, the civic administration and infrastructure of this area is overseen by SCB rather than GHMC. The chief executive officer (a civilian) appointed by the Indian Defense Ministry possesses the executive powers while the board president is an Indian army commander of the Brigadier grade, stationed in Secunderabad. The Osmania University a part of modern Hyderabad is an area of 3.4 km^{2} (1.3 sq mi) administered independently by its management. The Hyderabad Metropolitan Development Authority (HMDA) was formed in 2008 as an umbrella authority by merging multiple local development bodies. The jurisdiction of HMDA extends to 54 mandals located in five districts with a total area of 7,100 km^{2} (2,700 sq mi). It manages the development activities of the area including the administration of the Hyderabad Metropolitan Water Supply and Sewerage Board (HMWSSB), the Telangana Transmission Corporation, and the Telangana State Road Transport Corporation (TSRTC).

The Hyderabad City Police, established in 1847, is the law and order enforcement agency. Hyderabad Police Commissionerate jurisdiction is divided into five police zones, each headed by a Deputy Commissioner. The Hyderabad Traffic Police is headed by a Deputy Commissioner who is answerable to the Hyderabad City Police Commissioner. The area under the jurisdiction of Hyderabad City Police is smaller than the GHMC area, thus the suburbs of the city falls under the jurisdiction of Cyberabad Police Commissionerate. As of 2012, The "Greater Hyderabad Police Commissionerate" is a proposed plan of Telangana Government which would be formed by merging Hyderabad Police Commissionerate and Cyberabad Police Commissionerate. There will be four zones, each headed by Police commissioner, who will be reporting to the chief Commissioner.

Hyderabad houses the offices of the local governing bodies, along with the Telangana Legislature Assembly, the Telangana Secretariat, the Hyderabad High Court. Under the jurisdiction of High Court comes the lower city civil court and the Metropolitan Criminal Court. Greater Hyderabad Municipal Corporation area contains 24 state Legislative Assembly constituencies which come under five Lok Sabha (the lower house of the Parliament of India) constituencies.

== Utility services ==
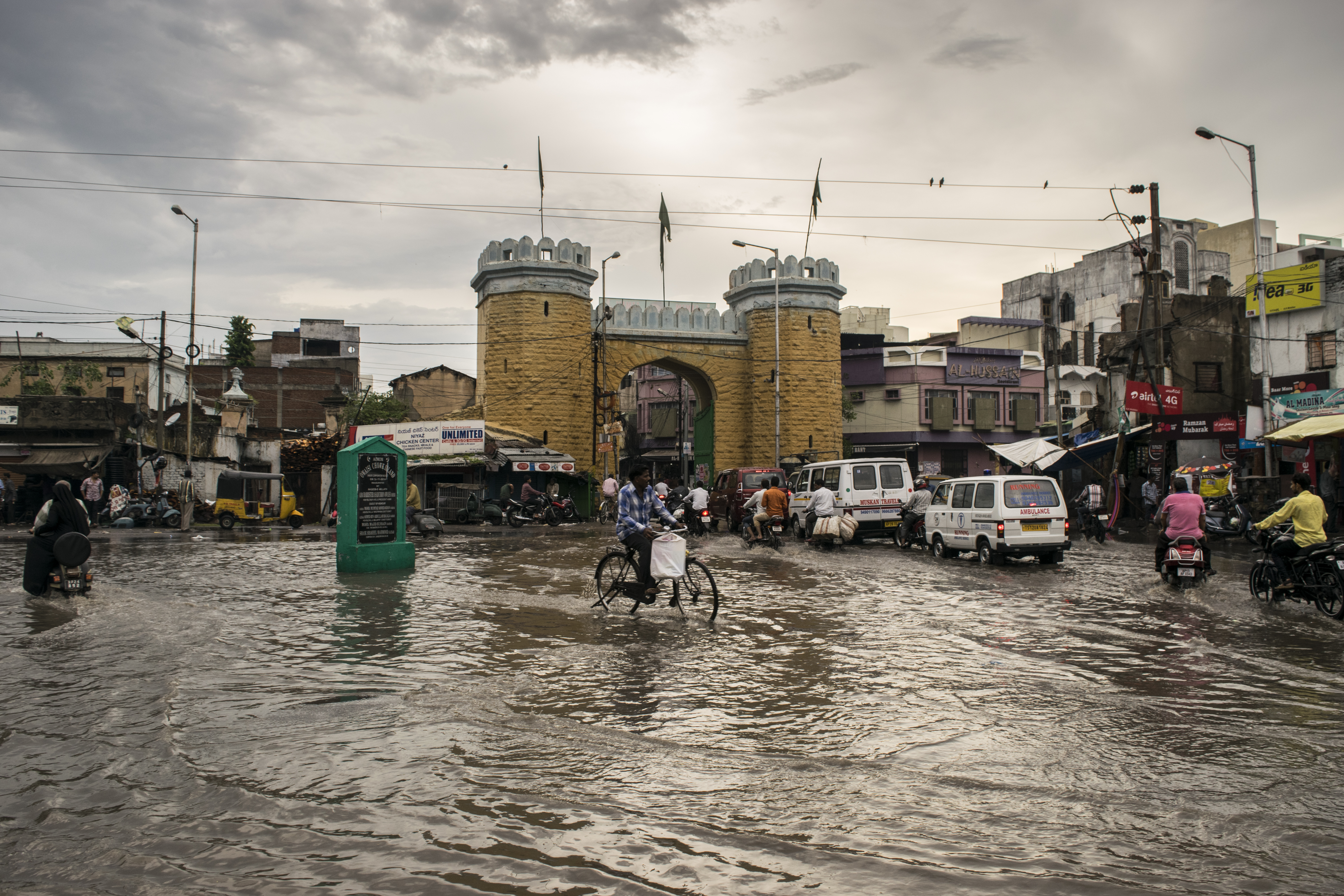
Heavy rains form blocked roads and sewage system.

Electricity, water and sewerage services to general public were first commissioned in 1925, with the establishment of The City Endowment Board. Rainwater harvesting, water and sewerage services are regulated by the Hyderabad Metropolitan Water Supply and Sewerage Board (HMWSSB). The HMWSSB sources water supply from multiple dams located in the suburbs of the city. To meet the growing consumption requirement and to provide regular water supply in the city, in 2005 the HMWSSB started operating 150 kilometres (93 mi)-long water supply piple-line from Nagarjuna Sagar Dam. The HMWSSB operates a service named "Dial-a-Tanker" to provide water in emergencies to the residents of the city. A registered customer can obtain the water tanker with the payment of minimal charges. The rapid economical growth leading to the rise in the city's population and consequent increased demand of water has further jeopardised the water shortage of the city which receives scanty rainfall. The region's groundwater levels are shrinking, and dams are facing water shortages. Inadequately treated effluents from industrial treatment plants are polluting the drinking water sources of the city.

The electricity is regulated through Telangana Central Power Distribution Company. Fire services are provided by the Andhra Pradesh Fire Services department, headed by a director general. The institution was established by the Telangana Fire Services act of 1999. As of March 2012, there are 13 fire stations in Hyderabad and the annual budget for the service was ₹1.85 billion (US$19 million). The Indian Postal Service is the major service provider in the city with five head post offices and multiple sub-post offices; many private courier services also operate in the city. In 1999, the AP state government launched e-Seva (electronic service) services for multiple utility agency's bill payment from one platform. The e-Seva is integrated with the departments of central and state governments.

== Environment ==
The city produces around 4,500 metric tonnes of solid waste everyday, which is transported from three collection units located in Imlibun, Yousufguda and Lower Tank Bund to the garbage dumping site of Jawaharnagar. The "Integrated Solid Waste Management" project was started in 2010 by GHMC to manage the waste disposal in the city. The project started with a sum of ₹ 4.34 billion, funded by the state government.

The Telangana Pollution Control Board (TSPCB) is a regulatory and screening authority of pollution in Hyderabad. The rapid rate of urbanisation with increased economic activities had encouraged migration and industries in Hyderabad, these changes led to an increase of air pollution, industrial waste, sound pollution and water pollution. The city is among the 16 most polluted cities of India, transportation vehicles are the main source of air pollution in the city. Every year there are around 1 million vehicles registrations in the city that increase air and sound pollution. The estimated deaths from particulate matter are about 1700–3000 persons every year in Hyderabad. As of 2006, the air pollution statistics are 20–50% from vehicle, 40–70% combining vehicle discharge with road dust, 10–30% from industrial discharges and 3–10% from household garbage burning. Hyderabad houses 140 large and small lakes in and around the city and As of 1996, there are 834 water tanks of below the size of 10 hectare. The ground water in Hyderabad has total water hardness up to 1000 ppm. APPCB and local authorities have designed and implemented multiple actions to control pollution in the city.
