= Telangana State Electricity Regulatory Commission =

Telangana Electricity Regulatory Commission

Agency overview
- Formed: 3 November 2014; 11 years ago
- Jurisdiction: Telangana Government
- Headquarters: Hyderabad, Telangana
- Employees: Classified
- Agency executives: Thannir Sriranga Rao, Chairman; M.D Manohar Raju, Technical member; Bandaru Krishnaiah, Financial member
- Website: Official website

Telangana Electricity Regulatory Commission (TGERC) is a governing body to control certain regulatory and safety functions related to the power sector in the Indian state of Telangana.

== History ==
As a consequence of the formation of the Telangana State, the Telangana State Electricity Regulatory Commission (TSERC) was constituted on 3 November 2014. It was incorporated under the Electricity Regulatory Commission Act, 1998, a Central Act, in August 1999. In 2003, under section 82 of the Electricity Act, the commission continued as the regulatory body in the state.

== Functions ==
- To improve the functionality of the power sector in the state of Telangana to make it viable and with prime focus of protecting the interests of the consumers.
- To promote competition, efficiency and economy in the power sector.
- To regulate tariffs of power generation, transmission and distribution in Telangana.
- To facilitate intrastate transmission and wheeling of electricity.
- To ensure transparency while exercising its powers and discharging its functions.

== See also ==
- Telangana State Southern Power Distribution Company Limited
- Telangana State Northern Power Distribution Company Limited
- Power Generation
- Transmission Corporation of Telangana
