= Osman Sagar =

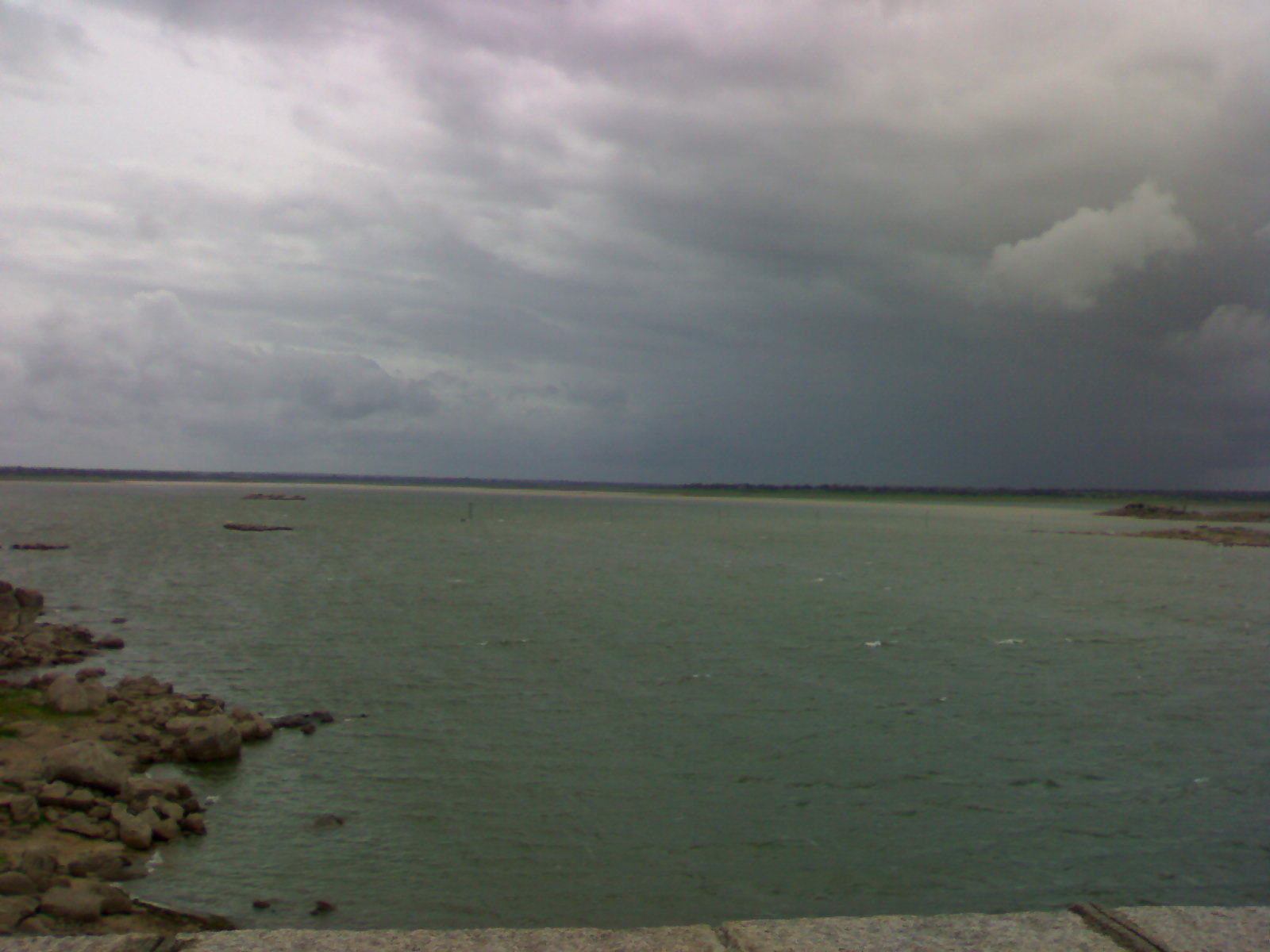
- View of Osman Sagar

- Osman Sagar within Hyderabad Osman Sagar (India)
- Official name: Osman Sagar
- Country: India
- Location: Gandipet, Ranga Reddy District, Telangana, India
- Coordinates: 17°23′N 78°18′E
- Purpose: Multi-purpose
- Status: Operational
- Construction began: July 15, 1912
- Opening date: May 8, 1921; 105 years ago
- Construction cost: ₹ 60 Lakh (As on November 11, 1915)
- Owner: Government of Telangana
- Operator: Hyderabad Metropolitan Water Supply and Sewerage Board

Dam and spillways
- Type of dam: Barrage
- Impounds: Musi
- Height: 35.9664 m (118.000 ft)
- Height (foundation): 535.5336 m
- Length: 1.92 kilometres (1.19 mi)
- Elevation at crest: 545.592 metres (1,790.00 ft)
- Spillways: 15 Gates
- Spillway capacity: 1,05,000 cusecs

Reservoir
- Creates: Osman Sagar
- Total capacity: 3.90 TMC (Reduced capacity due to silt accumulation); 5.541 TMC (During 1920)
- Catchment area: 738.147 km^{2}
- Surface area: 24.786 km^{2}

Osman Sagar is a reservoir in the city of Hyderabad. The lake is around 46 km^{2}, and the reservoir is around 29 km^{2}, with total level of 545.592 metres and a capacity of 110,435.702 cubic metres. Osman Sagar is the largest lake in Hyderabad, in terms of total water spread area. It covers a significantly larger land area of 46 km^{2} and water storage capacity (around 110,435.702 cubic metres).

== History ==
Osman Sagar was created by damming the Musi River in 1920, to provide an additional source of drinking water for Hyderabad and to protect the city after the Great Musi Flood of 1908. It was constructed during the reign of the last Nizam of Hyderabad State, Osman Ali Khan, hence the name.

A princely guest house called Sagar Mahal, overlooking the lake and now a heritage building, was built as a summer resort of the last Nizam. Its location on the banks of the lake offers scenic views. Telangana Tourism Department operates a resort in the building. The breeze of the lake has been popular with the locals since Nizam's time. When the Nizam consulted Sri Sir M.Visheswaraya regarding the twin problems of heavy floods in monsoon and acute shortage of water during summer, the latter designed a plan for construction of a Dam.

== Tourist spot ==
It is a popular tourist destination, especially in monsoon season when the reservoir is full. Its parks, resorts, and amusement park are a major attraction. This lake had served drinking water to Hyderabad city but, due to increase in population, is not sufficient to meet the city's water supply demand.

Himayat Ali Mirza, great-grandson of Nizam VII has recently joined the “save Osmansagar and Himayatsagar” campaign for saving the twin reservoirs and has also urged the Telangana CM to scrap the orders of GO 111.

Himayat said that now that the government had withdrawn the GO 111, the floods might affect various parts of the city. Scrapping of GO 111 has led to increasing the construction and concretisation activities near the lakes, ultimately resulting in consequent flooding.

== Water levels ==
In June 2012, the water level at Osman Sagar was 1769.8 feet. On 1 October 2012, the level was 540 metres, an increase of a mere 60 centimetres.

Similarly, in nearby Himayat Sagar, the water level in June 2012 was 531.35 metres and on 1 October 2012, it was 532.6 metres, an increase of about 120 centimetres. In October 2011, the water levels at Osman Sagar and Himayat Sagar were 543.1 metres and 535.19 metres, respectively.

== Images of the lake ==
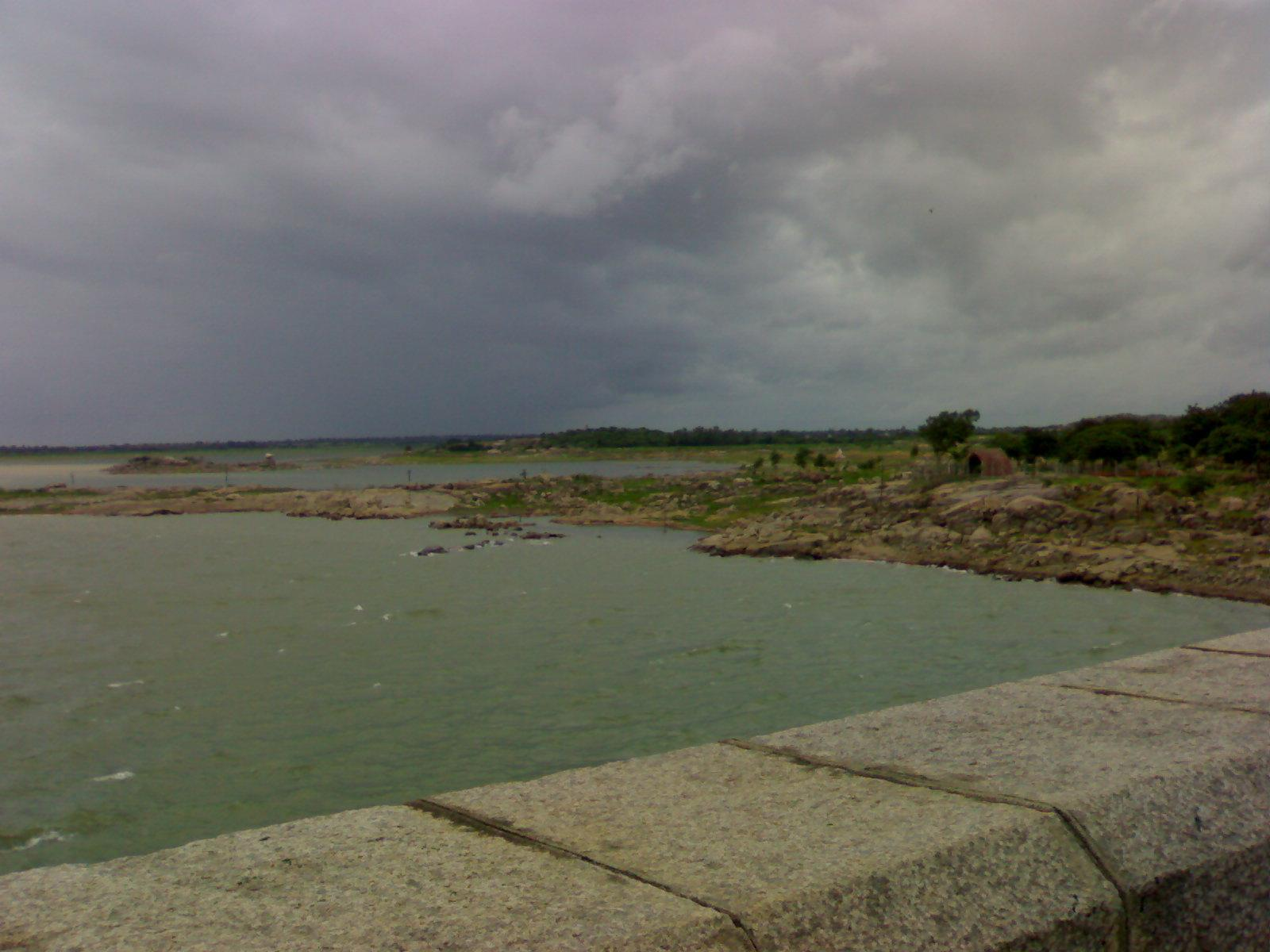

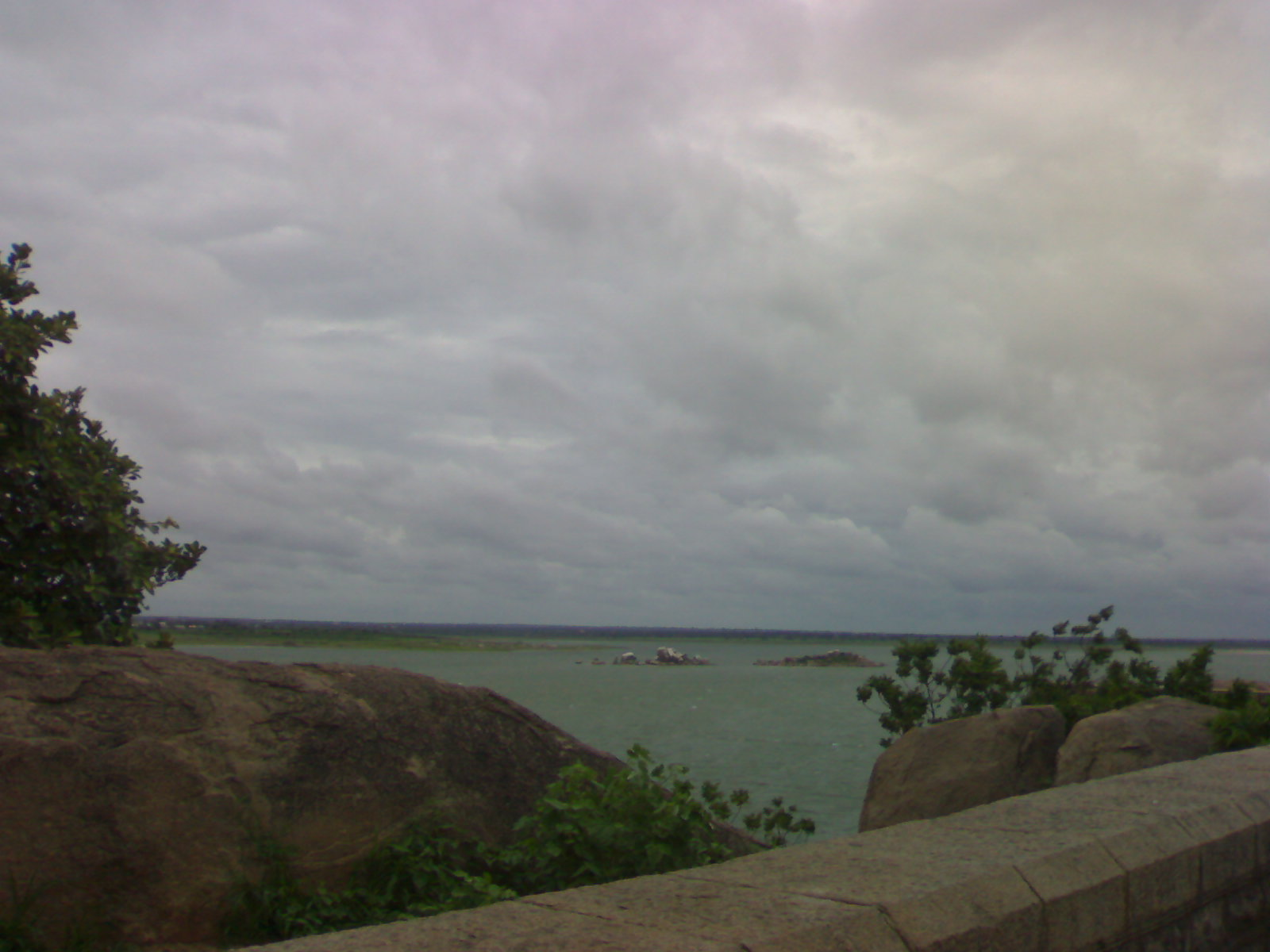

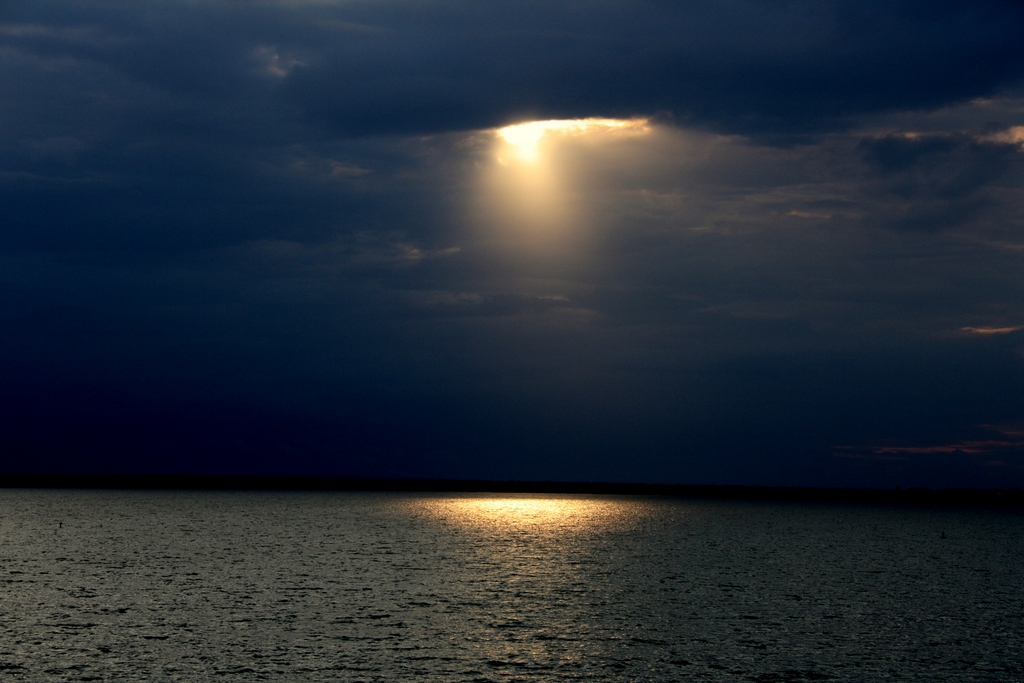

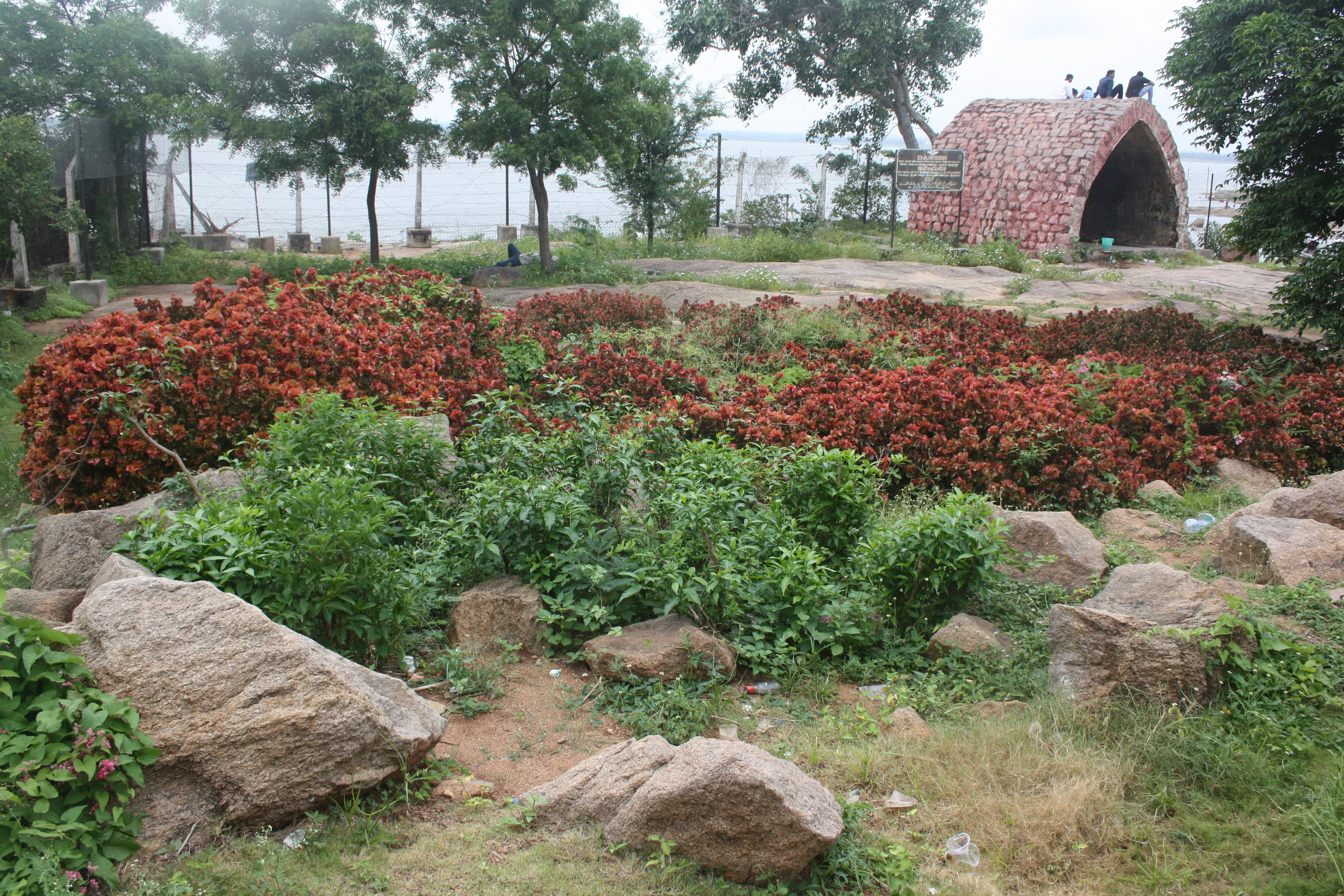

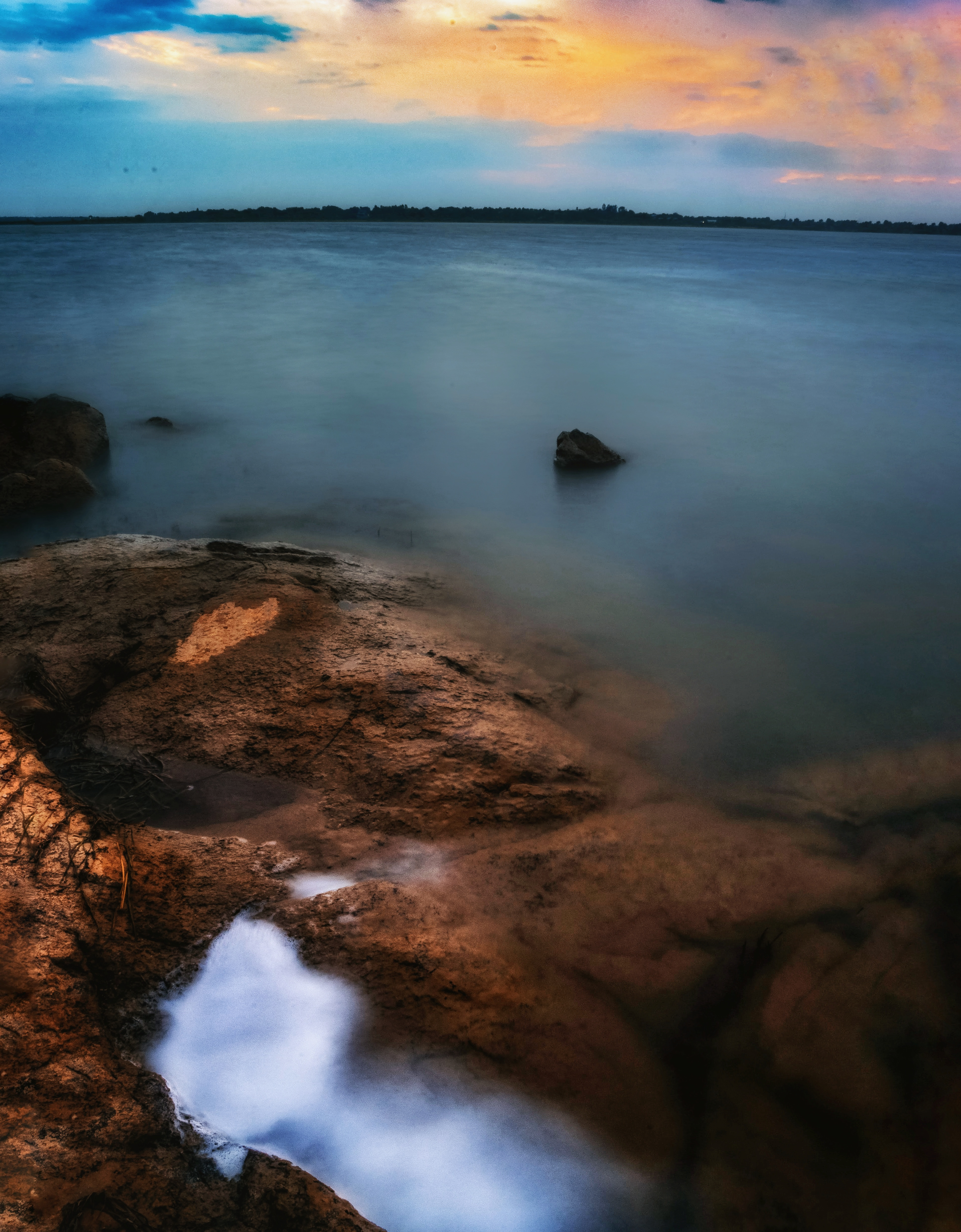
