= National Highway 563 (India) =

National highway in India

National Highway 563
- Map of National Highway 563 in red

Route information
- Maintained by NHAI
- Length: 248.83 km (154.62 mi)

Major junctions
- North end: Jagtial
- South end: Khammam

Location
- Country: India
- State: Telangana

Highway system
- Roads in India; Expressways; National; State; Asian; State Highways in Telangana
← NH 63	→ NH 365A

National Highway 563 (NH 563) is a National Highway in India. Total length 248.83(154.62mi). It passes through the districts of Jagtial, Karimnagar, Warangal and Khammam in Telangana state. The Karimnagar Cable Bridge is on the route and shortened the distance to Warangal by 7km.

== Route ==
Jagtial - Karimnagar - Warangal - Khammam.

== Junctions ==
NH 63 Terminal near Jagtial.
NH 163 near Warangal.
NH 365 near Maripeda.
NH 365A Terminal near Khammam.

== See also ==
- List of national highways in India
- List of national highways in India by state
