= Elgandal Fort =

Hill fort in Telangana, India

- ఎల్గందుల ఖిల్లా / بھیم گڑھ
- Karimnagar district, Telangana, India; Near Karimnagar (10 km away)
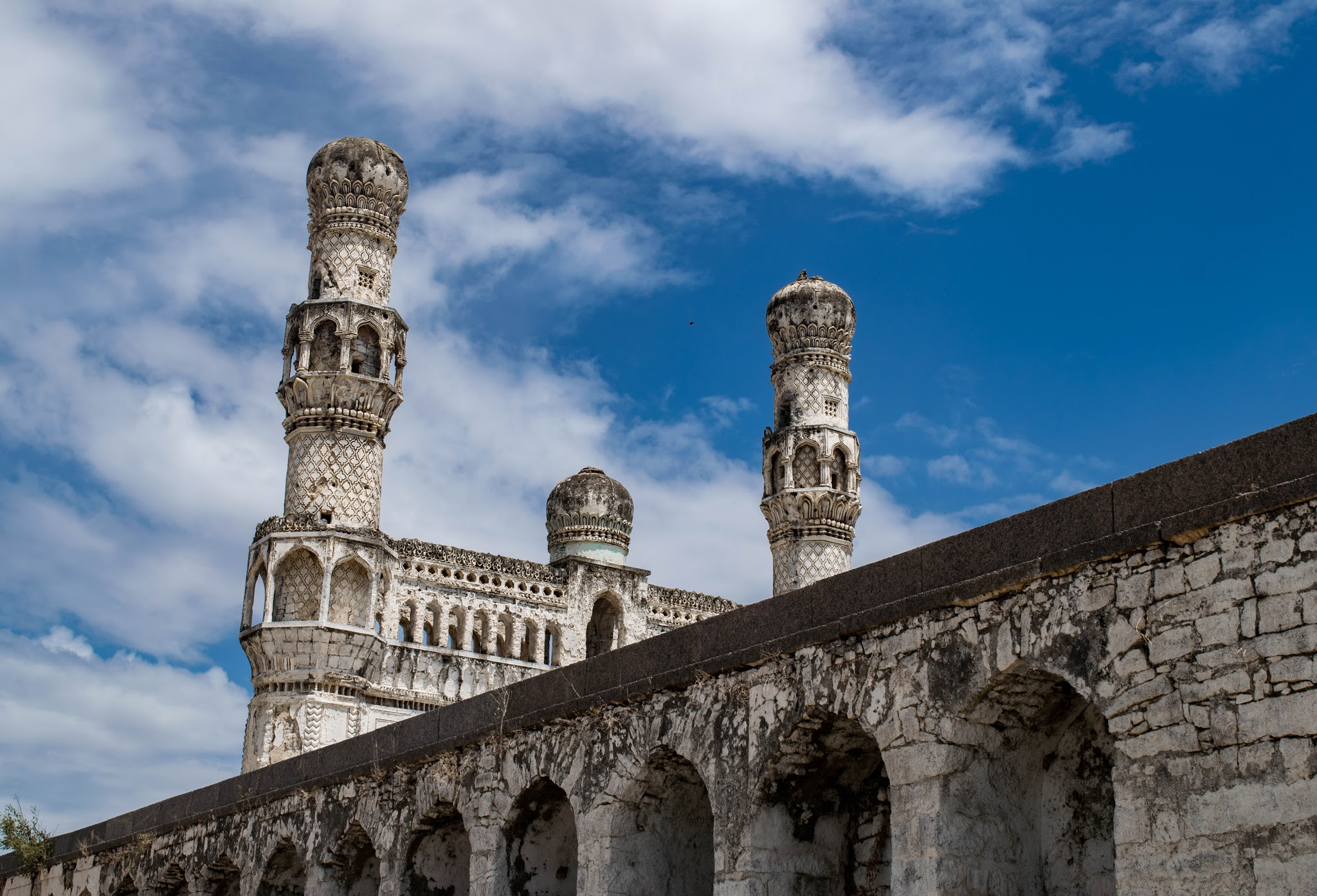
- The historic stone ramparts of Elgandal Fort overlooking palm groves

Site information
- Type: Hill fort
- Owner: Archaeological Survey of India / Telangana Tourism
- Controlled by: Government of Telangana
- Open to the public: Yes
- Condition: Partially ruined; preserved heritage site

Location
- Location of Elgandal Fort within Telangana
- Location within Telangana
- Coordinates: 18.420751°N 79.042601°E

Site history
- Built: 11th century (1083–1323)
- Built by: Kakatiya dynasty
- In use: 11th century – 1905
- Materials: Granite stone and mortar
- Battles/wars: Localized regional sieges during dynastic transitions from the Kakatiyas to the Nizams
- Events: Served as the administrative district headquarters of the Elgandal (later Karimnagar) region until shifted by the Sixth Nizam in 1905.

Garrison information
- Past commanders: Quinamul Mulk (Qutb Shahi era); Amin Khan (Khiledar under Asaf Jah I); Muqarrab Khan (Khiledar); Mirza Ibrahim Dhamsa (Khiledar, 1754); Bahadur Khan (Khiledar); Karimuddin (Khiledar)
- Garrison: Historically up to several thousand infantry, artillerymen, and cavalry units
- Occupants: Kakatiya dynasty (1083–1323); Musunuri Nayaks; Recharla Padmanayakas; Bahmani Sultanate; Qutb Shahi dynasty; Mughal Empire; Asaf Jahi dynasty (Nizams)

Elgandal Fort is situated amidst palm groves on the banks of the Manair River (a tributary of the Godavari River), approximately 10 kilometres (6.2 mi) from Karimnagar on the Sircilla Road in the Indian state of Telangana. It was once under the control of the Qutub Shahi dynasty, the Mughal Empire, and the Nizams of Hyderabad. During the Nizam era it was the headquarters of Karimnagar. It is believed that a secret tunnel connects Elgandal Fort and Manakondur some 9 kilometres (5.6 mi) from Karimnagar on the Karimnagar-Vemulawada highway.

== History ==
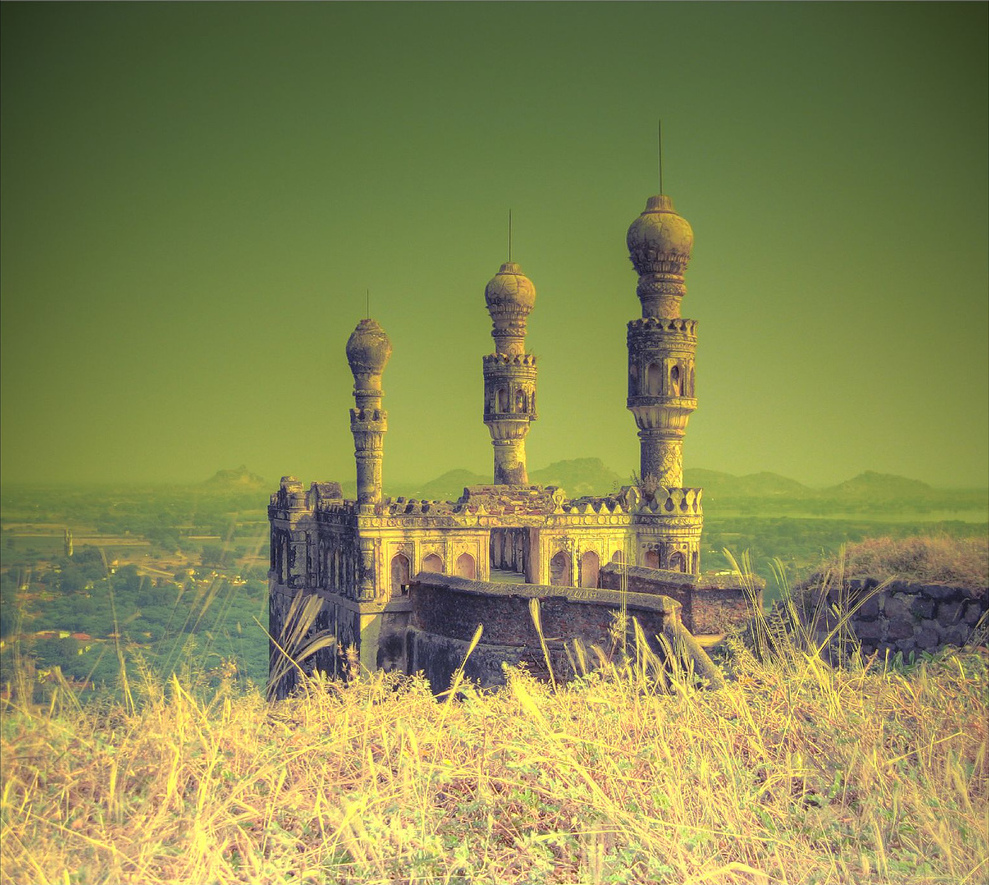
Teen Minar, Elgandal Fort

Originally known as Veligandula, Elgandal is a hillfort built of during the Kakatiya dynasty (1083–1323) and served as a stronghold for the warrior Musunuri Nayaks. The Qutb Shahi dynasty occupied the fort in the 16th century and posted Quinamul Mulk as commander. Subsequently, it fell under the administrative control of the Mughal Empire. Amin Khan was appointed as Khiledar of Elagandal during the reign of Nizam of Hyderabad Asaf Jah I (r. 1724–1748) followed by Muqarrab Khan. Mirza Ibrahim dhamsa became Khiledar during the reign of Nawab Salabat Jung. Dhamsa rebuilt and strengthened the fort in 1754 during the reign of Sikandar Jah (r.1803-1823). Bahadur Khan and Karimuddin served as Khiledars.

While reorganizing the districts, the Sixth Nizam, Mir Mahbub Ali Khan, shifted the District Headquarters from Elagandal to Karimnagar in 1905.

Elgandal's rulers surrounded the fort with a crocodile filled moat of around 5 metres (16 ft) wide and 4 metres (13 ft) deep to prevent enemy incursions.

The site also houses a mosque and an eidgah, the designated place for special Eid prayers.

When Lower Manair Dam was opened in the 1980s the direct roads connecting Elgandal to Karimnagar town were submerged and no longer usable. In 2026, a new direct bridge connecting Elgandal to Karimnagar was completed and opened to solve the problem.

== Notable sites ==
Elagndal village is located 15 km from Karimnagar. This is a historical place. The places to visit in Elagandal village include

- The fort on a hill called as Elagandal khilla
- Brindavan tank outside the eastern gateway of the fort, built by Zafar-ud-Doula in 1754, with minarets that oscillate when shaken
- "Dho Minar"

DoMinar built by Muslim kings (Nizams), has two tall pillars and the height of the pillars is approximately equal to that of Hyderabad Charminar.

== See also ==
- Musunuri Nayaks
- Salabat Jung
- Asaf Jahi dynasty
