= Kondapalkala =

- Revenue Village
- Location in Manakondur, Karimnagar, Telangana, India Kondapalkala (India)
- Coordinates: 18°23′02″N 79°18′26″E
- Country: India
- State: Telangana
- District: Karimnagar
- Panchayath: Kondapalkala

Languages
  - Official: Telugu
- Time zone: UTC+5:30 (IST)
- PIN: 505474
- Website: కొండపల్కల
- Refer Telugu Website

Kondapalkala is a major panchayat village located in the district of Karimnagar, Telangana, India. It is located in Manakondur mandal. It is situated about 15 km from Lower Manair Dam, Karimnagar. It is reachable through road via 9 km from Chengerla which is on Karimnagar-Warangal State Highway.
