= Satavahana Urban Development Authority =

Government agency in Karimnagar, Telangana, India

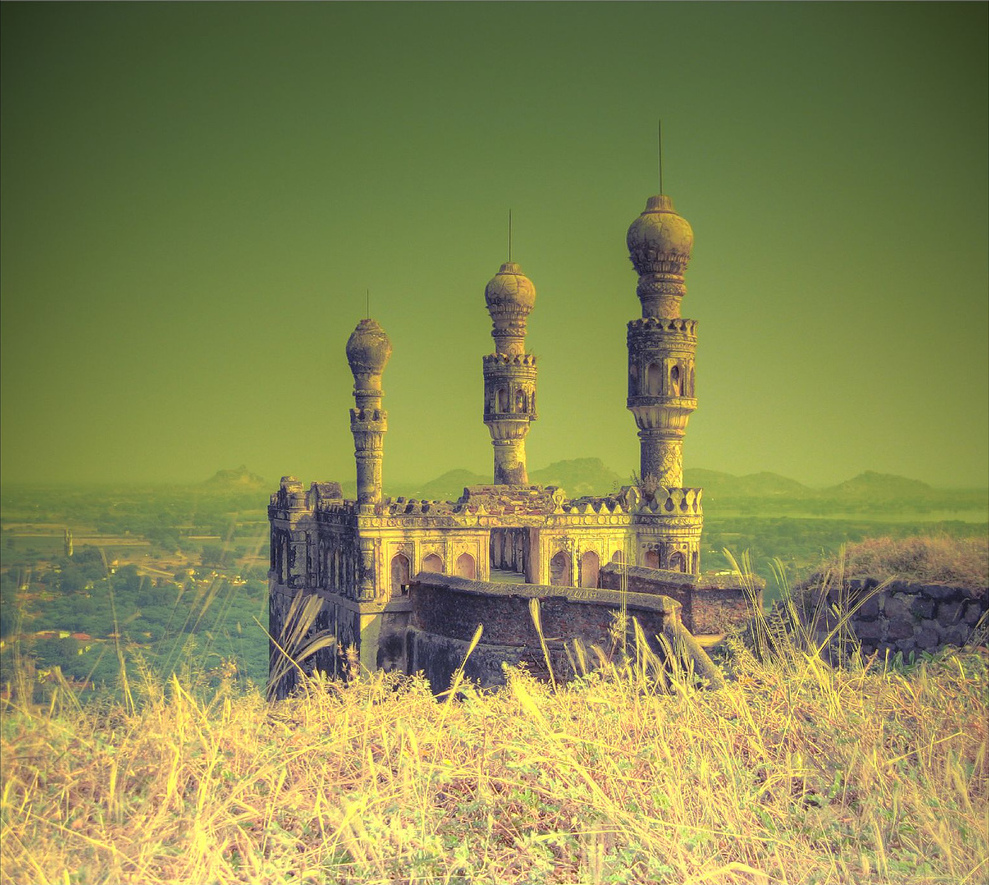

Agency overview
- Formed: 17 May 2017; 9 years ago
- Type: Urban Planning Agency
- Jurisdiction: Government of Telangana
- Headquarters: Karimnagar; 18.436944°N 79.124167°E
- Agency executives: G.V. Ramakrishna rao (Chairman); K. Narender reddy (New Chairman)

The Satavahana Urban Development Authority Karimnagar is an urban planning agency in Karimnagar district of the Indian state of Telangana. It was set up on 17 May 2017 by the state government and has its headquarters at Karimnagar.

The urban development agency with a geographical area of spreading across Karimnagar, Karimnagar Urban and Rural Mandals of the city sees over the infrastructure development and planning for the 489,985 residents of the town.
