= State Electricity Board =

State Electricity Board may refer to:

== India ==
- Assam State Electricity Board
  - Assam State Electricity Board S.C.
- Bihar State Electricity Board
- Gujarat State Electricity Board
- Jharkhand State Electricity Board
- Haryana State Electricity Board
- Himachal Pradesh State Electricity Board
- Kerala State Electricity Board
- Maharashtra State Electricity Board
- Punjab State Electricity Board
- Rajasthan State Electricity Board
- West Bengal State Electricity Board
- Tamil Nadu Electricity Board

== United Kingdom ==
For the former electricity boards of the UK see Electricity Act 1947

== See also ==
- State Electricity Commission (disambiguation)
