= Karimnagar =

Karimnagar Elagandula
- City
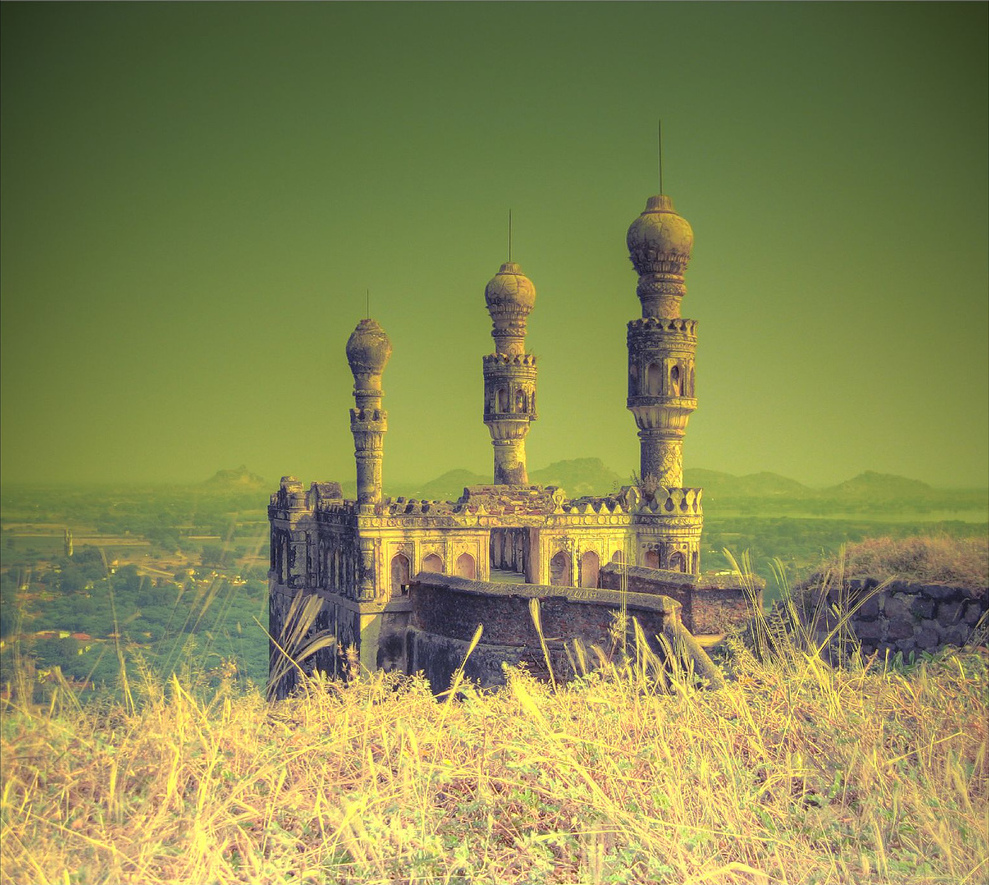
- Elgandal Fort in Karimnagar
- Nickname: City of Granites
- Karimnagar (Telangana) Karimnagar (India)
- Coordinates: 18°26′19.0″N 79°07′43.7″E
- Country: India
- State: Telangana
- District: Karimnagar
- Region: Deccan
- Established: 1905; 121 years ago
- Incorporated (Municipal Council): 1931; 95 years ago
- Incorporated (Municipal Corporation): 2005; 21 years ago
- Named for: Syed Kareemullah Shah Quadri

Government
  - Type: Municipal Corporation
  - Body: Karimnagar Municipal Corporation
  - Mayor: Shri Kolagani Srinivas
  - MLA: Gangula Kamalakar
  - MP: Bandi Sanjay Kumar

Area
  - City: 204.50 km^{2} (78.96 sq mi)
- Elevation: 297 m (974 ft)

Population (2025)
  - City: 493,997
  - Rank: 4th(Telangana)
  - Density: 2,415.6/km^{2} (6,256.5/sq mi)
  - Metro: 797,447 (SUDA)
- Demonym(s): Karimnagari, Karimnagaris

Languages
  - Official: Telugu, Urdu
- Time zone: UTC+5:30 (IST)
- PIN: 505001 to 505010,505481,505451,505469,505527
- Telephone code: 91-878-
- ISO 3166 code: IN-TG
- Vehicle registration: TG–02 / AP-15 (Old Number)
- Sex ratio: 981.4 ♀/♂
- Literacy: 89.9
- Planning agency: Satavahana Urban Development Authority (SUDA)
- Website: Karimnagar Official Website

Karimnagar, formerly known as Elagandula, is a city and District Headquarters in the Indian state of Telangana. Karimnagar is a major urban agglomeration in the state. It is the 4th largest City in the state after Hyderabad, Warangal and Nizamabad and is the Municipal Corporation headquarters of the Karimnagar district. It is situated on the banks of Manair River, which is a tributary of the Godavari River. It is the third largest and fastest growing urban settlement in the state, according to the 2011 census. It has registered a population growth rate of 45.46% and 38.87% respectively over the past two decades between 1991 and 2011, which is the highest growth rate among major cities of Telangana. It serves as a major educational and health hub for the northern districts of Telangana. It is a major business center and widely known for its agricultural and granite industries, earning the nickname "City of Granites."

It has been selected as one of the hundred Indian cities to be developed as a smart city under PM Narendra Modi's flagship Smart Cities Mission by replacing Hyderabad based on the request from the former Chief Minister of Telangana K. Chandrashekar Rao.

== Etymology ==
In the olden days, this place was known as Veligandula, Tellakandula. Poet Veligandala Narayya who was the principal disciple of Poet Potana hailed from this place. During the Nizam era, the village was named Karimnagar by an Elgandala Qiladar, Syed Karimuddin.

== History ==
=== Asaf Jahi Dynasty ===
During the Asaf Jahi dynasty (1724–1948), Karimnagar was part of the Hyderabad State under the Nizams. The region grew in importance due to its strategic location, contributing to agriculture, trade, and military activities.

=== Modern era ===
It became a district in 1905. In the 1920s, serving under the Nizam of Hyderabad, the District Collector Sir John Hunter oversaw construction of the clock tower which still stands in the city centre today. In 1937, Janab Shaikhaan Sahab built the Karimnagar Kaman to commemorate the Nizam's Silver Jubilee.

It was previously part of princely Hyderabad State and then became part of Hyderabad state in 1948 after the Hyderabad state was annexed into the Indian Union. It then became part of Andhra Pradesh state on 1 November 1956 after merging the Telugu speaking region of Hyderabad state with Andhra state.

At the beginning of the 21st century, the city was connected by railway on the Peddapalli-Nizamabad line. After almost 6 decades of Telangana statehood movement, on 2 June 2014 it became part of newly formed state of Telangana by Andhra Pradesh Reorganisation Act, 2014.

== Demographics ==
Historical population
Year	Pop.	±%
1901	5,752	—
1911	8,347	+45.1%
1921	9,399	+12.6%
1931	10,903	+16.0%
1941	17,437	+59.9%
1951	23,826	+36.6%
1961	31,554	+32.4%
1971	48,918	+55.0%
1981	86,125	+76.1%
1991	148,583	+72.5%
2001	218,302	+46.9%
2011	297,447	+36.3%

Karimnagar has a population of 397,447 within its corporation limits, according to 2011 census, making it the Third largest city in Telangana state. Karimnagar Urban Agglomeration comprising Municipal Corporation and Urban Development authority of 689,985.City out growths include Bommakal (with a population of 9,031), Arepalle (6,987), Alugunur (6,164), Chinthakunta (3,437) and Sitharampur (3,017). Besides these outgrowths, there are many sub-urban areas on the outskirts, which are merged into corporation limits. It is the most densely populated city in Telangana, with a density of 11,114 persons per km^{2}.

Karimnagar city has a literacy rate of 85.82%, which is highest urban literacy rate in Telangana state. Karimnagar urban agglomeration has a literacy rate of 84.93% which is almost equal to the National Urban average of 85%. The literacy rate for males and females for Karimnagar urban region stood at 91.06% and 78.69% respectively.

Religions in Karimnagar
Religion	Percentage
Hindu	77.1%
Muslim	20.7%
Christian	1.3%
Others	0.9%

== Climate ==
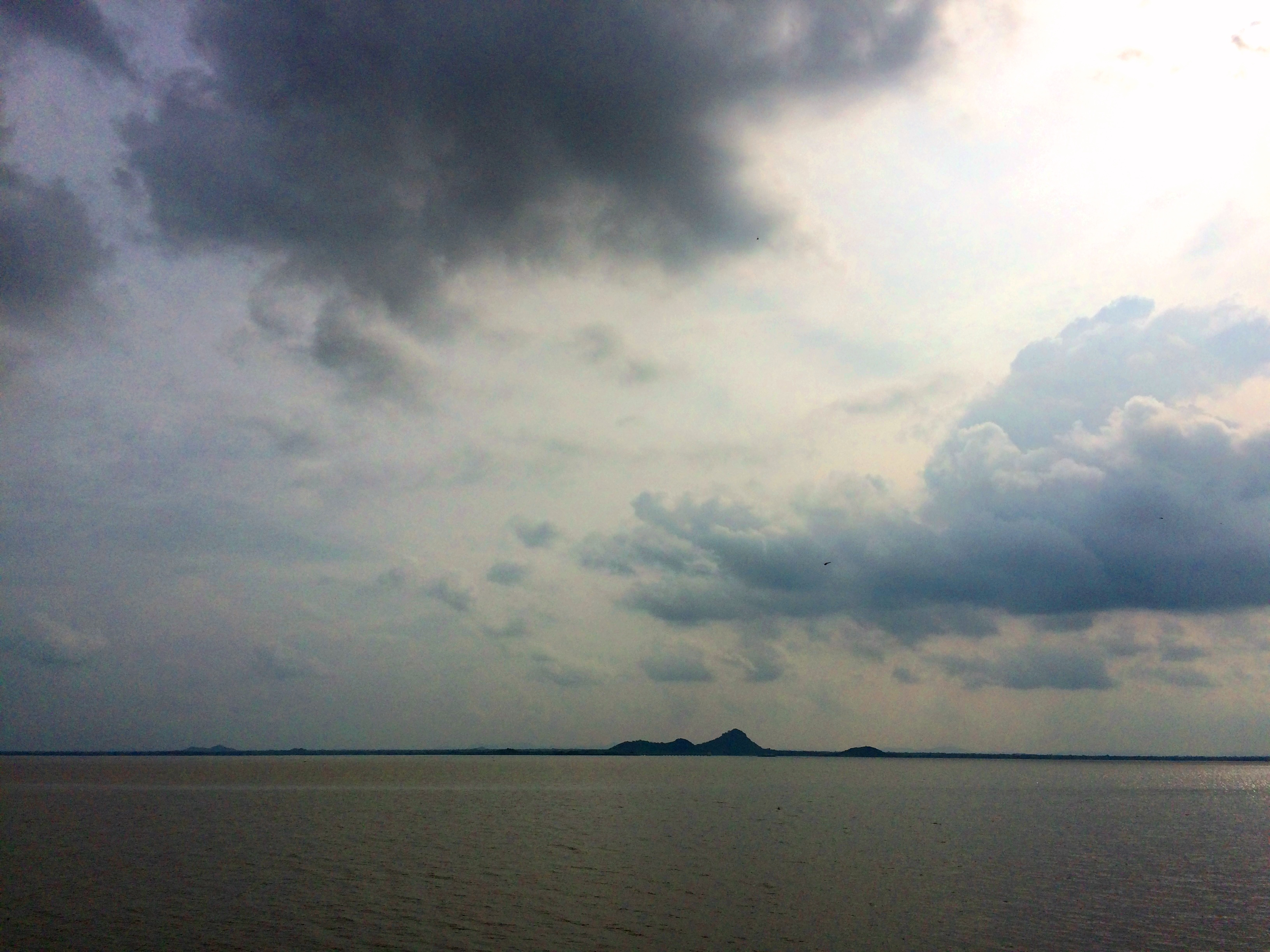
Dense Clouds over LMD Reservoir at Karimnagar

Karimnagar experiences dry inland climatic conditions with hot summers and cool winters. The city of Karimnagar gets most of its rainfall from the Southwest monsoon. The summer season is extremely hot, but temperatures decline with the onset of the monsoons, and the winter season is generally cool. The most popular tourist season is from November to February.

The summer season starts in March and can continue through early June. During this period temperatures range from a minimum of 27 °C to a maximum of 39 °C. The highest recorded temperature in the area is around 48 °C. Nights are much cooler, and the humidity is around 50%. October and November experiences increased rainfall from the Northeast monsoon. During this time, daytime temperatures average around 30 °C. The winter season starts in December and lasts through February. During this time, temperatures range from a minimum of 10 °C to a maximum of 35 °C.

Climate data for Karimnagar
Month	Jan	Feb	Mar	Apr	May	Jun	Jul	Aug	Sep	Oct	Nov	Dec	Year
Mean daily maximum °C (°F)	29 (84)	32 (90)	37 (99)	40 (104)	42 (108)	34 (93)	30 (86)	29 (84)	31 (88)	32 (90)	29 (84)	28 (82)	33 (91)
Mean daily minimum °C (°F)	13 (55)	16 (61)	22 (72)	26 (79)	28 (82)	26 (79)	24 (75)	23 (73)	22 (72)	20 (68)	16 (61)	12 (54)	21 (69)
Average precipitation mm (inches)	32 (1.3)	8 (0.3)	43 (1.7)	17 (0.7)	41 (1.6)	162 (6.4)	204 (8.0)	126 (5.0)	133 (5.2)	75 (3.0)	48 (1.9)	18 (0.7)	907 (35.8)
Source: Sunmap

== Civic administration ==
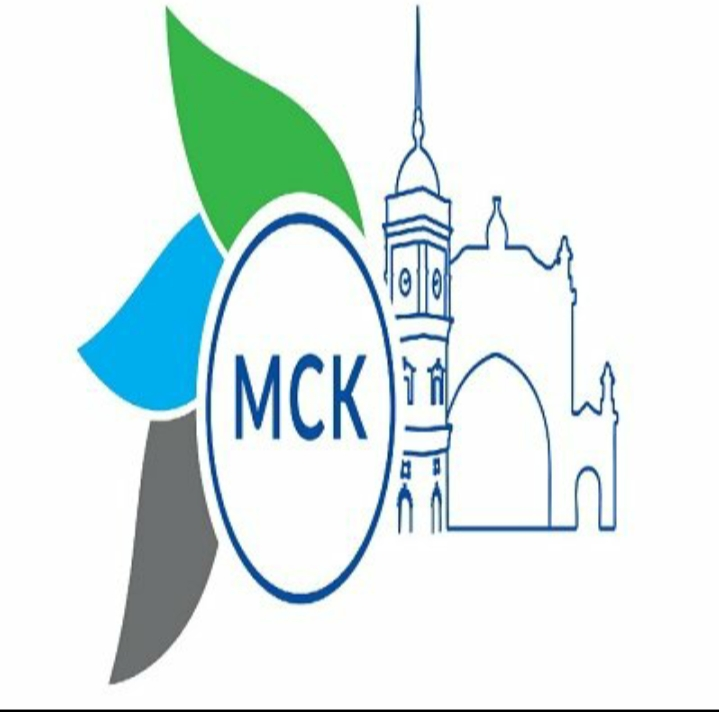
Karimnagar Municipal Corporation logo

Karimnagar Municipal Corporation is the civic body that administers the city. It was constituted as a third grade municipality in the year 1952, as a second grade in 1959, first grade in 1984, special grade in 1996, selection grade in 1999 and finally upgraded to corporation in 2005.

The city is served by Karimnagar Police Commissionerate.

Despite the city growing in leaps and bounds, the area of the civic body remaining unaltered. Ever since the municipality was upgraded into corporation in 2005, the merger of adjoining villages on the outskirts with the Corporation was being met with wide opposition from local village authorities.

It belongs to the Karimnagar Lok Sabha constituency.

The area is served by TSNPDCL.

== Sports ==
United Karimnagar district has produced many sports persons from the rural level in sports like Karate, Cricket, Kabaddi, Kho-Kho and many other sports. Dr. B.R. Ambedkar Sports Complex is the primary sports complex in the city of Karimnagar. The sports complex has a main stadium used for sports like Athletics, Cricket, Football, an indoor stadium, a hockey field, swimming pool, kho-kho grounds, basketball courts. Another indoor stadium was built inside SRR college.

== Healthcare ==
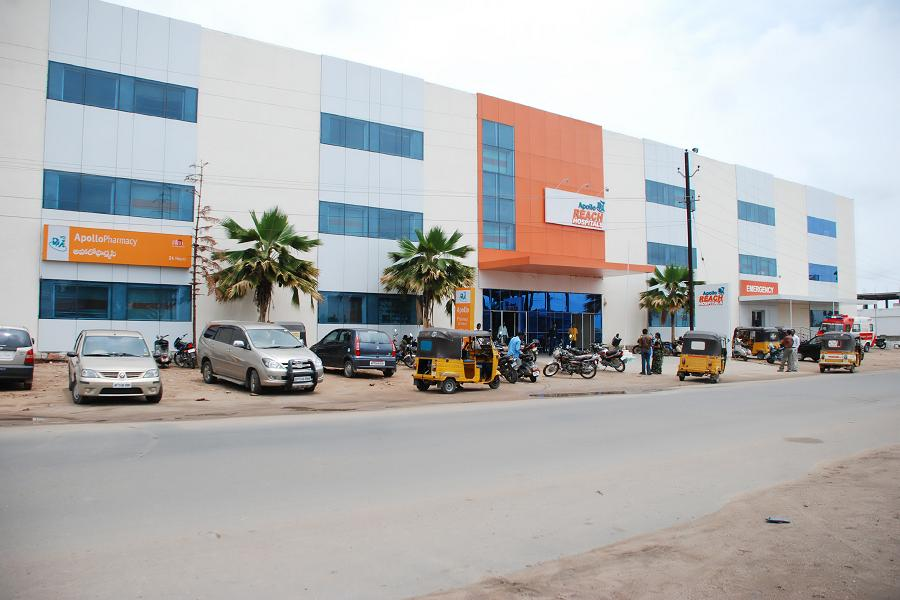
Apollo Hospitals, Karimnagar

Karimnagar has evolved into a major health center for its surrounding districts because it is centrally located to all the nearby Districts and Talukas like Jagtial, Siricilla, Ramagundam, Peddapalli, Mancherial, Siddipet, Komaram Bheem, Manthani, Huzurabad, Jammikunta, Husnabad, Sultanabad, Vemulawada, Korutla, Metpalli, Choppadhandi, Manakondur, Bejjanki, Thimmapur, Dharmapuri, Kodimyal, Malyal, Gangadhara and Kalva Srirampur.

Patients come from all over the surrounding districts. Karimnagar has three medical institutions, Government Medical College, Chalmeda Anand Rao Institute of Medical Sciences, and Prathima Institute of Medical Sciences. There is also a cancer hospital in the city. The Newly opened Mother and Child care hospital is next to the Government hospital. Government Civil Hospital is the dominant medical institution.

== Tourism ==
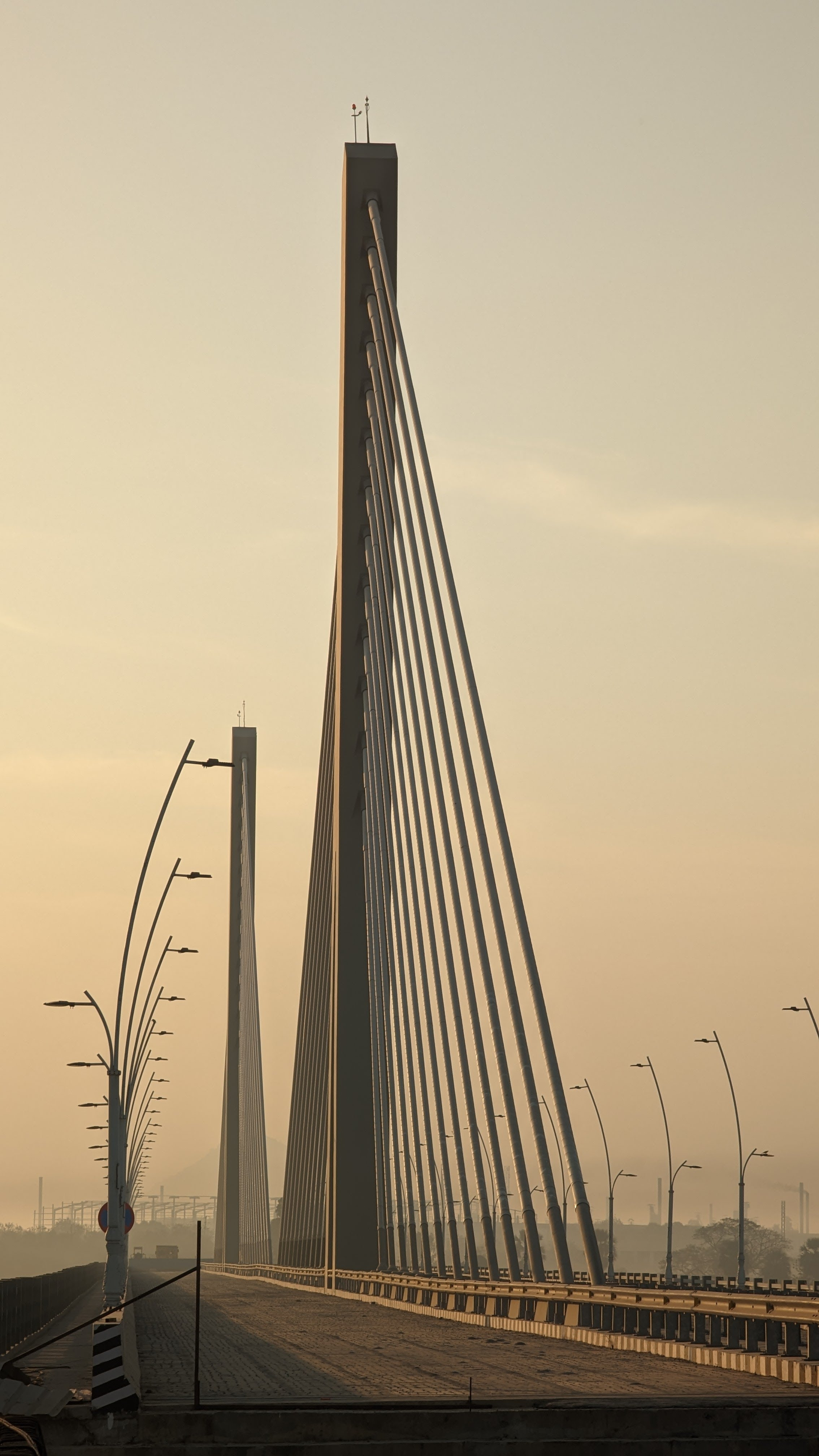
Cable bridge

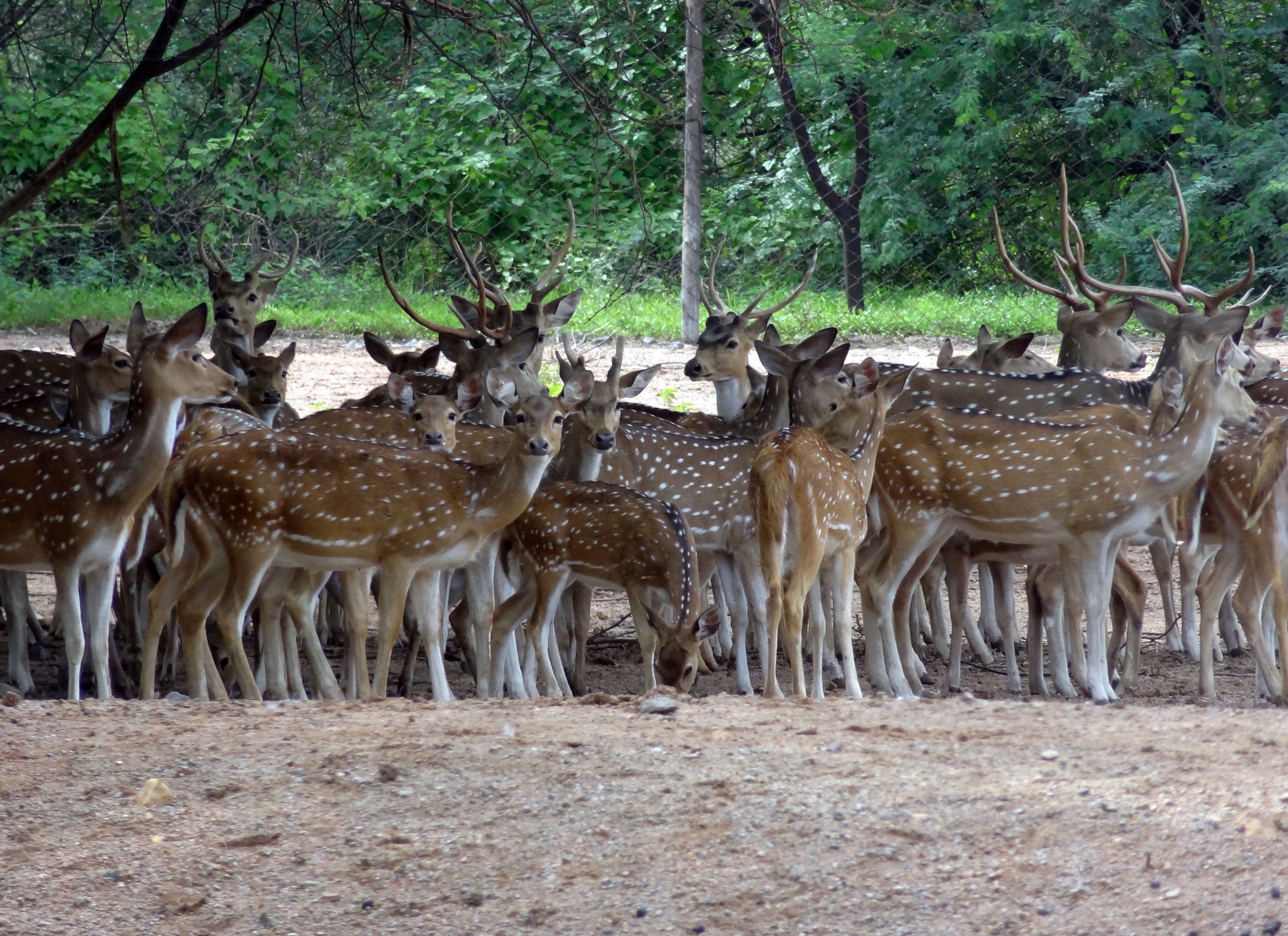
Deer Park at Karimnagar

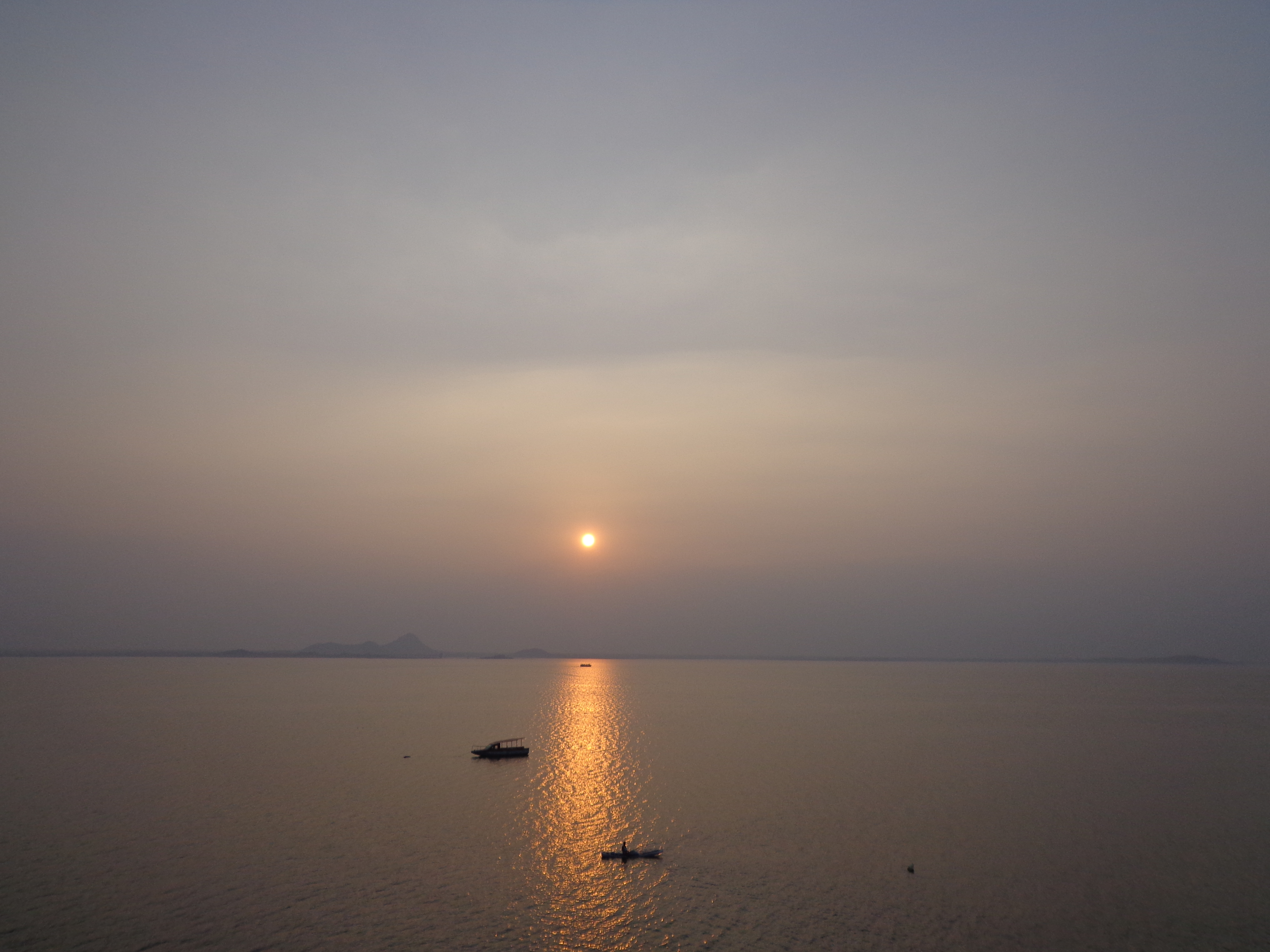
View from Manair Dam

Lower Manair Dam (LMD) is one of the largest dams in the state of Telangana. LMD is a major tourism spot for people of Karimnagar and the surrounding area. The dam has boating facilities.

Ujwala park and Deer park near LMD are another major part of the city's tourism.

The Karimnagar Cable Bridge has been constructed on Manair River between Housing Board Colony and Sadashivpalli, opened in 2023, it shortens the distance to Warangal by 7 KM. The bridge is part of the large Manair Riverfront project which has been proposed by the Chief minister of Telangana after his ministers visited Sabarmati riverfront in Ahmedabad on Sabarmati river.

== Culture ==
Telugu is the major language spoken in Karimnagar; Urdu is also widely spoken. The typical attire includes the traditional Chira and Pancha, and also modern dress styles. Kurta Pajama is also worn by many. Karimnagar Silver Filigree is one of the local silverware handicrafts.

=== Religious worships and festivals ===
The spring festival of Bathukamma is typical in this region. Other major Hindu festivals celebrated in the region include Ugadi, Sri Ramanavami, Vinayaka Chavithi, Holi, Sri Krishna Janmashtami, Dasara, Deepavali, Sankranti, and Maha Sivaratri. Muslims in this area also celebrate Eid-ul-Fitr, Eid al-Adha, Ramadan (ninth month of the Islamic calendar), Laylat al-Qadr (Shab-e-Qadr), Isra and Mi'raj (Shab-e-Meraj), Shab-e-barat (Mid-Sha'ban), Milad-un-Nabi (Mawlid) and Muharram (Day of Ashura). These are usually greeted with great pomp and ceremony. Christians in this area celebrate Christmas and Good Friday.

ISKCON Metpally- Sri Sri Radha Govardhandhari Temple, Raja Rajeshwara Swamy Temple at Vemulawada, Narasimha Temple at Dharmapuri, Jagtial district, Anjaneya Temple at Kondagattu, Jagtial District, and Veerabhadra Temple at Kothakonda Jatara are some of the prominent and famous religious destinations.

=== Cuisine ===
Sakinalu a local snack made from rice, gingelly seeds and ajwain during Sankranti festival And Biryani is a common cuisine of the state. Sarvapindi is another traditional snack native to the Telangana state. Kudumulu are of two types, one made with just rice flour are called kudumula while the other type made with rice flour and beans are called gudlakudumulu.

== Economy ==
The economy of Karimnagar comes from mainly three sectors Agriculture, industry, and services. There are many granite quarries on the city outskirts near Baopet, and many Agro based industries, Paddy and cotton are the major crops produced in Karimnagar. The Lower Manair Dam in Karimnagar has a capacity of 24.5 thousand million cubic feet which can irrigate 400,000 acres of land.

Former Information Technology minister of Telangana, KTR laid the foundation stone for an IT hub for the aim of expanding IT to cities like Karimnagar, Warangal, Nizamabad, Khammam and Mahabubnagar. The IT Tower was completed and inaugurated in 2020.

Four integrated markets, a central building to accommodate farmers and grocers wishing to sell their food items, are under construction as of the year 2023.

Karimnagar is nationally renowned for its silver filigree.

== Transport ==
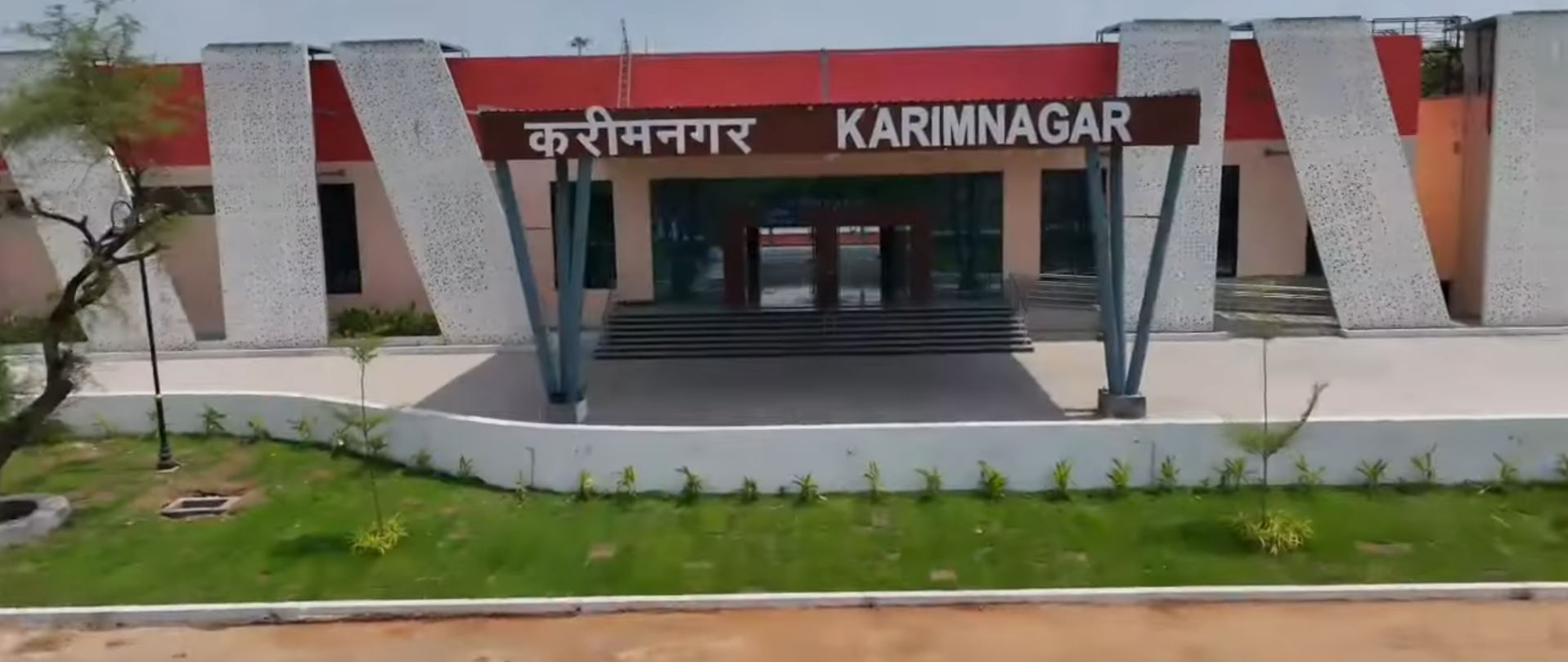
Karimnagar railway station

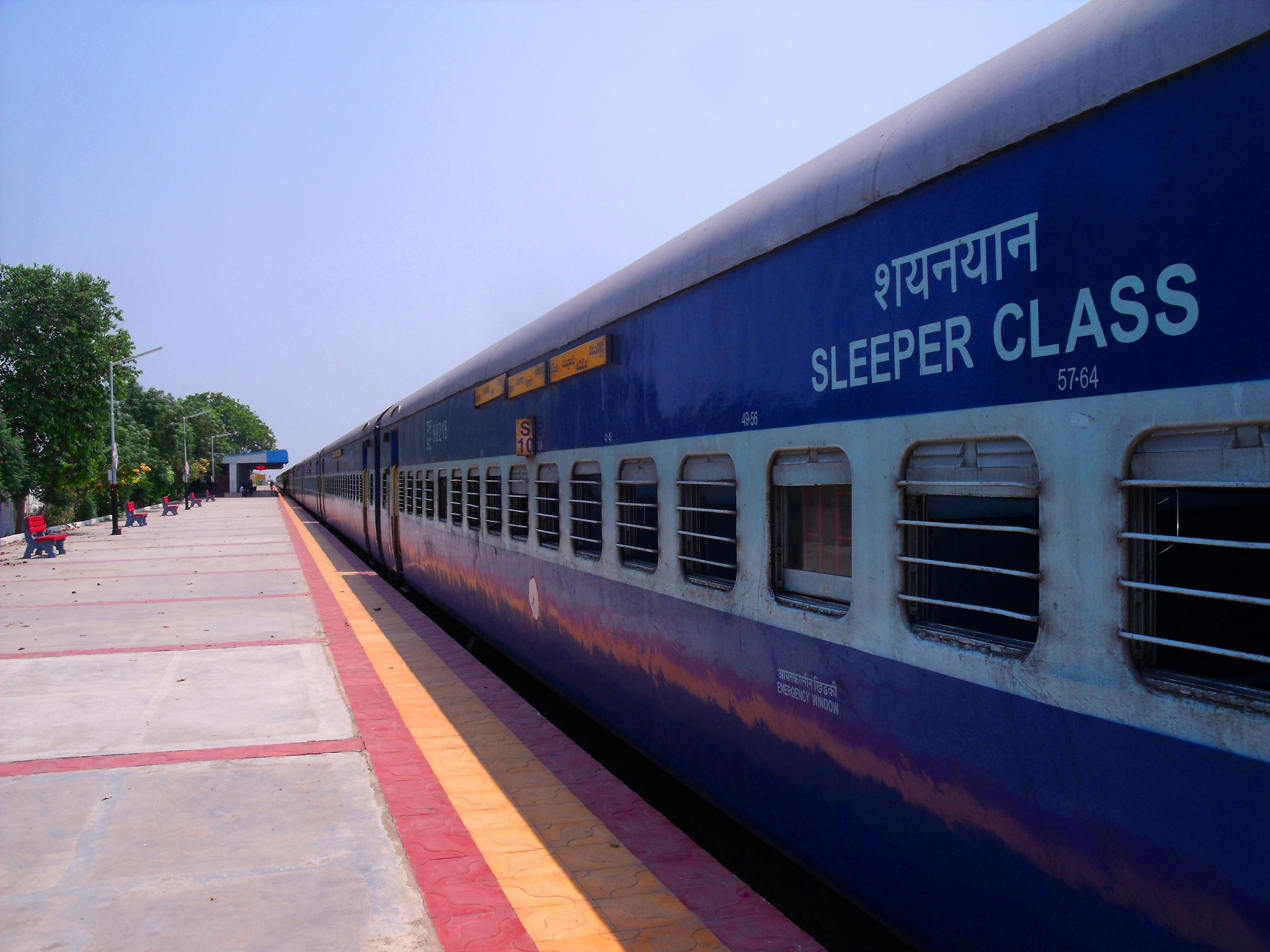
A train halts at the railway station in Karimnagar.

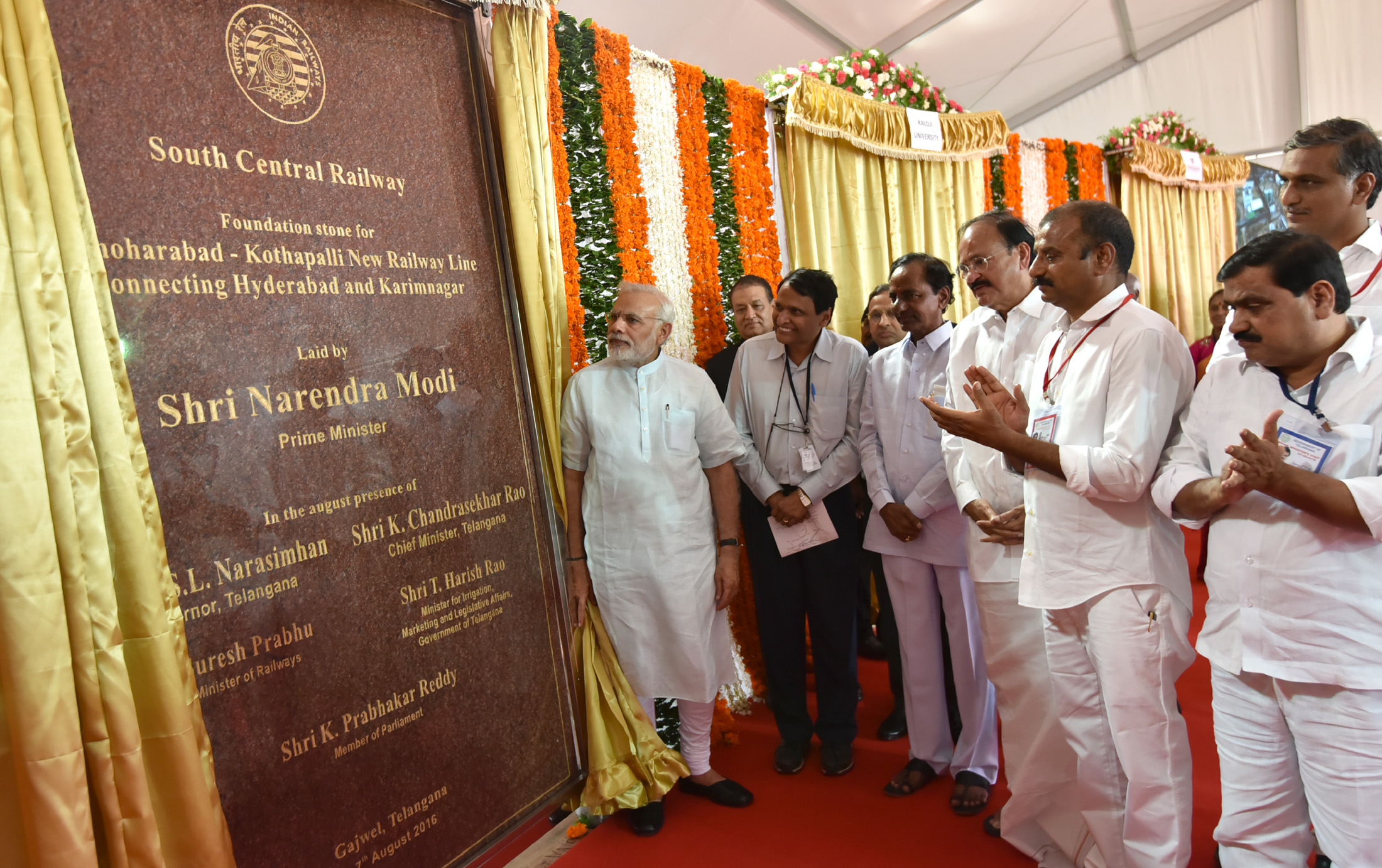
Kothapalli-Manoharabad railway foundation stone being laid

Karimnagar is connected to other major cities and towns by means of road. State Highway 1 which connects with the Hyderabad–Karimnagar–Mancherial Highway coal-belt corridor passes through town. In addition, State highways 7, 10, 11 and National Highway 563 which connects Jagtial–Karimnagar–Warangal–Khammam.

=== Airway ===
Rajiv Gandhi International Airport in Hyderabad is the nearest airport at a distance of 210 km by road. There are three Helipads in the city inside the district collectorate. The other two nearest airports to Karimnagar are Ramagundam Airport and Warangal Airport which are closed, but may be reopened in the future under the UDAN scheme.

=== Road ===
Dr. B. R. Ambedkar Bus Station, in the center of the city is the second biggest bus station in the State of Telangana after Hyderabad bus station.

72 Electric Vehicle Charging Stations were approved for Karimnagar in 2023 and will operate under the Private Public Partnership model.

=== Railway ===
Karimnagar railway station provides rail connectivity to the city, located on the Peddapalli–Nizamabad section of New Delhi–Chennai main line. It is under the jurisdiction of Secunderabad railway division of the South Central Railway zone.

Karimnagar is connected to cities like Mumbai with a weekly Super fast express, Hyderabad with Kachiguda passenger daily, Tirupati with a biweekly super fast express and Nizamabad with a DEMU train. In October 2023, the Karimnagar-Nizamabad MEMU was extended up to Bodhan.

The Kothapalli-Manoharabad railway line will reduce the travel time from Karimnagar to Hyderabad. It is scheduled to be completed by 2025. The Manoharabad – Siddipet portion of the line was inaugurated on 3 October 2023.

In 2023, construction work began at the railway station to add a second and third platform, part of the Amrit Bharat Station Scheme, a modernization and expansion effort by the government.

== Media ==
The Telugu News publishers in the city are Janam Sakshi, Maithri Channel, Eenadu, ABN Andhra Jyothi. Apart from the local language, there are also English papers such as The Hans India.

== Education ==
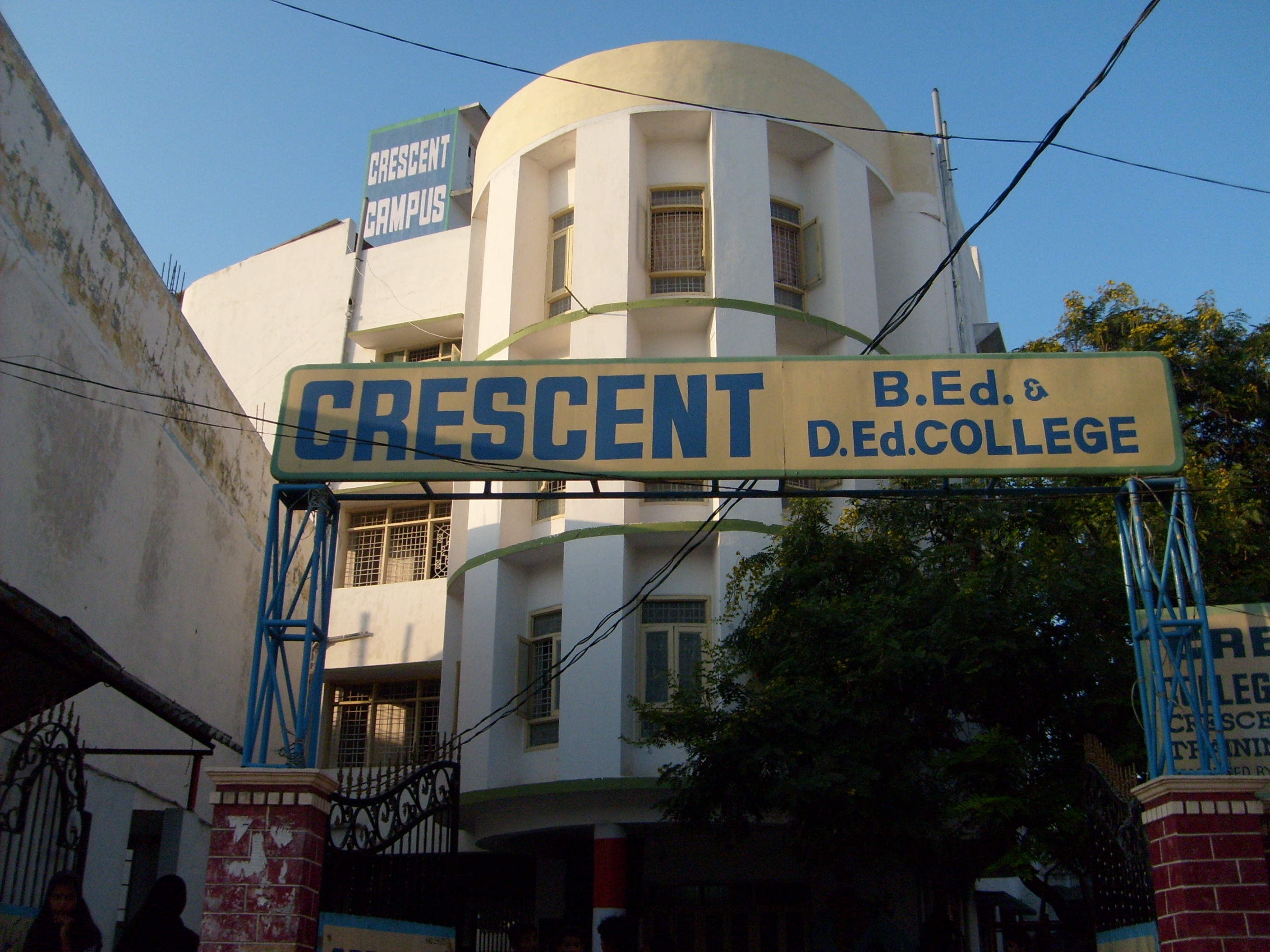
Crescent College

Karimnagar is a major education center in north-western Telangana. There are many schools and intermediate colleges in the city. Karimnagar has technology institutes, medical colleges, and law colleges.

Universities

- Government Medical College, Karimnagar

== Notable people ==
- Paidi Jairaj
- Bandi Sanjay Kumar
- Gangula Kamalakar
- N. Kumarayya
- Malyala Rajaiah
- Midde Ramulu
- P. V. Narasimha Rao
- C. Narayana Reddy
- G. Ram Reddy
- Siva Reddy
- Surender Reddy

== See also ==
- List of cities and towns in Telangana
- List of districts in Telangana
- Telangana
