= Manakondur =

- Village
- Location in Telangana, India Manakondur (India)
- Coordinates: 18°24′8.548″N 79°11′15.149″E
- Country: India
- State: Telangana
- District: Karimnagar
- Talukas: Manakondur

Population (2011)
  - Total: 12,687

Languages
  - Official: Telugu
- Time zone: UTC+5:30 (IST)
- PIN: 505469
- Vehicle registration: TG
- Website: telangana.gov.in

Manakondur is a village in Manakondur mandal of Karimnagar district of the Indian state of Telangana.

== History ==
In 2023, a cable bridge spanning Manair river between Sadashivpalli and Karimnagar was opened. This bridge shortens the distance between Karimnagar and Manakondur.

== Transport ==
National Highway 563 passes through this town.

=== Rail ===
There is a proposed new line from Karimnagar-Hasanparthy sanctioned for final location survey in 2023. Manakundur will be part of this proposed line.
