= Telangana State Northern Power Distribution Company Limited =

Northern Power Distribution Company of Telangana Limited (TGNPDCL)
- Type: State Government-owned Corporation
- Industry: Electricity Distribution
- Founded: 2 June 2014; 12 years ago
- Headquarters: Hanumakonda, Telangana, India
- Key people: Sri Karnati Varun Reddy, IAS (Chairman And Managing Director)
- Products: Electricity
- Website: tgnpdcl.com

Northern Power Distribution Company of Telangana Limited, abbreviated as TGNPDCL , is the electricity distribution company owned by the government of Telangana for the 18 northern districts of Telangana with Hanumakonda as the headquarters.

== History ==
The Northern Power Distribution Company of Telangana Limited was incorporated under Companies Act 1956 and commenced its operations on 2 June 2014 with Warangal as its headquarters. It is successor to APNPDCL which in turn APSEB.APNPDCL

Its first chairman and managing director was Kathikeya Mishra, who was succeeded by Venkatanaraya Narayana and then by the third and present chairman and managing director Annamaneni Gopal Rao.

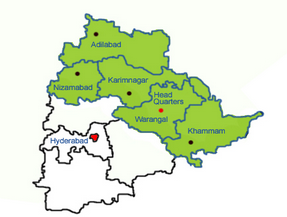
Map showing the districts of the Northern Power Distribution Company of Telangana Limited (in green)

== Network ==
The power company encompasses 18 districts: Mancherial, Nirmal, Kumram Bheem, Kamareddy, Peddapalli, Jagtial, Rajanna, Warangal, Hanumakonda, Mahabubabad, Mulugu, Prof Jayashankar, Jangaon, Bhadradri Kothagudem, Adilabad, Nizamabad, Karimnagar and Khammam districts. Its network reaches a population of about 1.55 crores spread across villages and towns surrounding an area of 66,860 km^{2}. In order to overcome the shortage of power in the state, solar power is also considered.

== See also ==
- Telangana Southern Power Distribution Company Limited
- Telangana Power Generation Corporation
- Transmission Corporation of Telangana
