= State electricity regulatory commission (India) =

Government agencies in India

State electricity regulatory commissions in India are autonomous, statutory and regulatory bodies constituted for ensuring generation and distribution of electricity in the states and union territories of India. They are formed by notification in official gazette in accordance with the Electricity Regulatory Commissions Act, 1998. The commissions are vested with legislative and judicial powers to resolve conflicts between licence holders of production and distribution of electricity, or consumers and electricity distribution entities, and authority to draft regulations and sub ordinate regulations. The president and other members of such commissions are appointed by state governments in consultation with the Chief Justice of the state High Court.

== History and objectives ==
State electricity regulatory commissions are formed with the following objectives:

- Acts as a regulator for distribution licensees during the purchase and procurement of electricity by them .
- Facilitates the transmission of electricity between different states.
- Facilitates issuing of licences to transmission and distribution licensees applicants and electricity traders within the state.
- Fix the rates during wholesale, bulk or retail generation of electricity and its supply, transmission and wheeling within the state.
- Resolve conflicts between the licensees and/or the generating companies.
- Integrate state grid codes with the grid code designed by Central Electricity Regulatory Commission (CERC) .
- Streamlining electricity tariff.
- Transparency in designing subsidy related policies.
- Promoting environmental policity in matters relating to electricity.
- Any other matters connected or incidental with it.

== Advisory role ==
State electricity regulatory commissions also have advisory roles:

- Designing schemes promoting electricity industry related investment.
- Planning initiatives in Electrical industry which promotes competition and improves efficiency and brings economy in activities.
- Initiating restructuring and reorganisation in Electricity industry.
- Guiding state government in any issues referred to it which are related to generation, transmission, distribution and trading of electricity in the state.

== Powers ==
State electricity regulatory commissions act as substitutes to civil courts and are vested with legislative and judicial powers to resolve conflicts between licence holders of production and distribution of electricity, or consumers and electricity distribution entities and with authority to draft regulations and sub ordinate regulations. They can also issue orders for the recovery of amounts from power consuming entities which are due to electricity generating companies.

== Composition ==
State electricity regulatory commissions generally have three members, one of which is the chairperson.

Chairperson will be appointed by the state government in consultation with the Chief Justice of the state High Court. The eligibility for Chairperson is that he should be serving or served as Judge in any High Court; other members should have good ability, integrity and standing. They should also be proficient experience and expertise knowledge in subjects of accountancy, law, commerce, economics, industry, administration and public affairs and problem solving ability in same.

The Chairperson and members of state electricity regulatory commissions are not permitted to hold any other office of profit or any position which is connected with any political party and are also barred from carrying on any business or continuing any profession in any field.

== List of state electricity regulatory commissions ==
List of state electricity regulatory commissions
Rank	State	Agency
1	Arunachal Pradesh	Arunachal Pradesh Electricity Regulatory Commission
2	Assam	Assam Electricity Regulatory Commission
3	Andhra Pradesh	Andhra Pradesh Electricity Regulatory Commission
4	Bihar	Bihar Electricity Regulatory Commission
5	Chhattisgarh	Chhattisgarh State Electricity Regulatory Commission
6	Delhi	Delhi Electricity Regulatory Commission
7	Gujarat	Gujarat Electricity Regulatory Commission
8	Himachal Pradesh	Himachal Pradesh Electricity Regulatory Commission
9	Haryana	Haryana Electricity Regulatory Commission
10	Jharkhand	Jharkhand Electricity Regulatory Commission
11	Karnataka	Karnataka Electricity Regulatory Commission
12	Kerala	Kerala Electricity Regulatory Commission
13	Madhya Pradesh	Madhya Pradesh Electricity Regulatory Commission
14	Maharashtra	Maharashtra Electricity Regulatory Commission
15	Meghalaya	Meghalaya State Electricity Regulatory Commission
16	Nagaland	Nagaland Electricity Regulatory Commission
17	Orissa	Orissa Electricity Regulatory Commission
18	Punjab	Punjab State Electricity Regulatory Commission
19	Rajasthan	Rajasthan Electricity Regulatory Commission
20	Tamil Nadu	Tamil Nadu Electricity Regulatory Commission
21	Tripura	Tripura Electricity Regulatory Commission
22	Uttarakhand	Uttarakhand Electricity Regulatory Commission
23	Uttar Pradesh	Uttar Pradesh Electricity Regulatory Commission
24	West Bengal	West Bengal Electricity Regulatory Commission
25	Manipur and Mizoram	Joint Electricity Regulatory Commission for the States of Manipur & Mizoram
26	Union Territories	Joint Electricity Regulatory Commission for Union Territories

== See also ==
- Central Electricity Regulatory Commission, the counterpart body of the central government
