= Electricity Authority =

Electricity Authority may refer to:

- British Electricity Authority
- Central Electricity Authority, United Kingdom
- Central Electricity Authority (India)
  - Central Electricity Authority Regulations
- Electricity Authority of Cambodia
- Electricity Authority of Cyprus
- Electricity Authority (Israel)
- Electricity Authority (New Zealand)
- Electricity Generating Authority of Thailand
- Manx Electricity Authority

== See also ==
- Electricity Commission (disambiguation)
