= Karimnagar Cable Bridge =

Cable-Stayed bridge in India

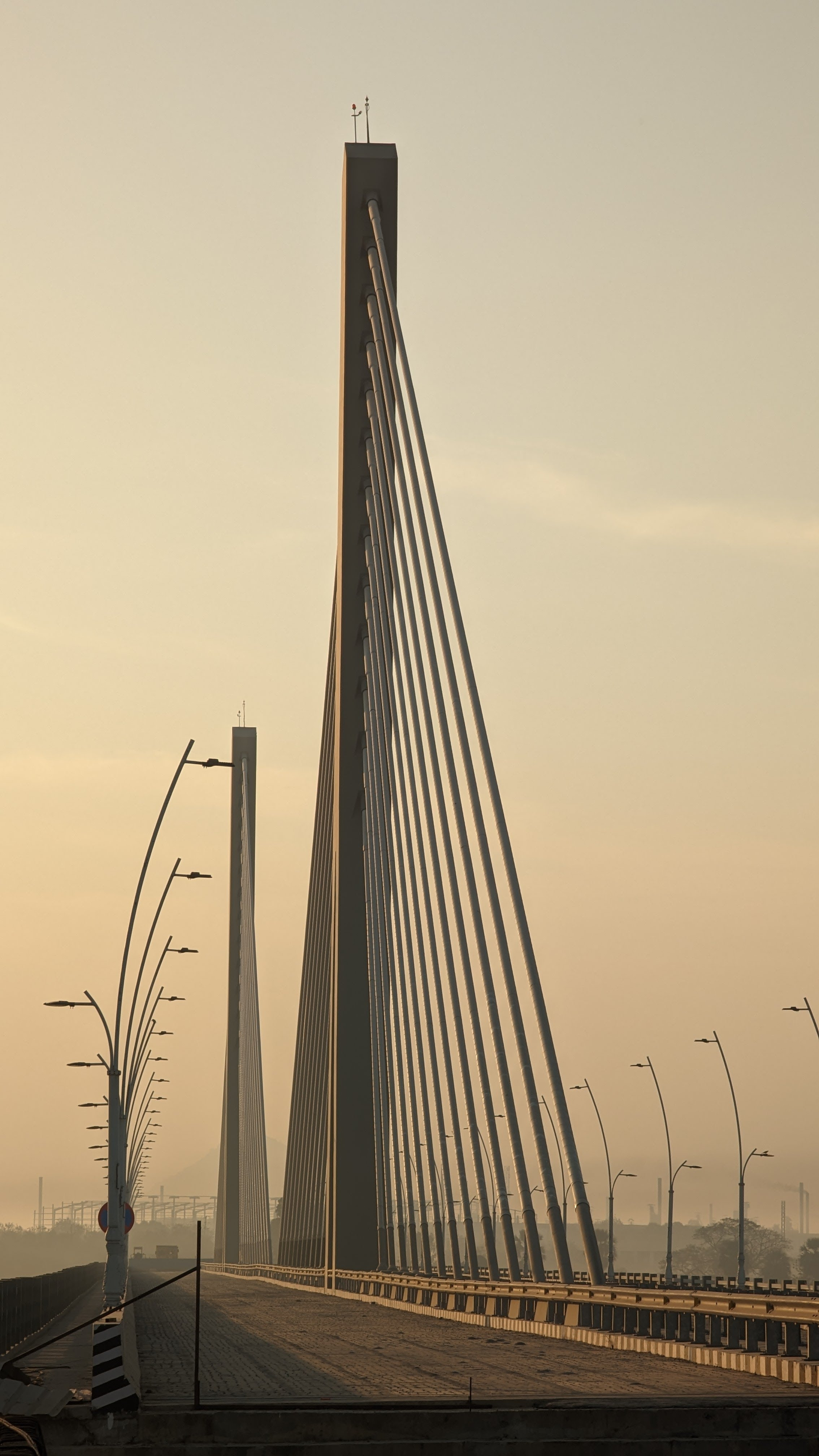
- Coordinates: 18.4205844°N 79.152773°E
- Carries: 4 lane carriageway, pedestrians and bicycles
- Crosses: Manair River

Characteristics
- Design: Cable-stayed bridge
- Total length: 500 meters (1,600 ft)

History
- Engineering design by: Tata Projects; Gülermak
- Construction cost: ₹224 crore
- Opened: 21 June 2023; 3 years ago

Location
- Interactive map of Karimnagar Cable Bridge

The Karimnagar Cable Bridge is a cable-stayed bridge in Karimnagar, Telangana, India. The bridge is located near the outskirts of Karimnagar town and is part of the National Highway 563 route.

== Background ==
Vehicles going from Karimnagar town towards Warangal and Hyderabad had to cross Alugunoor Bridge causing frequent traffic problems. This bridge was constructed with a length of 500 meters at a cost of 183 crore rupees to solve the traffic problem. After crossing the Maneru river from Karimnagar Kaman through the housing board, it linked to the Warangal highway from Sadashivapalli under Manakondur constituency. This also reduces the distance to Warangal by seven kilometers. Built with foreign technology to attract tourists, this cable bridge has 220 meter high pylons on both sides and connects the pylons with 136 segments without any hindrance to boat travel in Maneru River.

== Construction ==
After the full amount of funds were sanctioned in late 2017, construction began. The project was jointly executed by Tata Projects Limited and Gülermak, a Turkey based firm. The bridge was inaugurated on 21 June 2023 after undergoing safety and load testing.

== As a tourist place ==
The cable bridge has become a popular tourist destination in the district.

== See also ==
- Durgam Cheruvu Bridge
