= National Highway 365 (India) =

National highway in India

National Highway 365
- Map of the National Highway in red

Route information
- Length: 189 km (117 mi)

Major junctions
- West end: Nakrekal
- East end: Mallampalli

Location
- Country: India
- States: Telangana

Highway system
- Roads in India; Expressways; National; State; Asian
← NH 65	→ NH 163

National Highway 365, commonly called NH 365, is a national highway in India. It is a spur road of National Highway 65. It traverses the state of Telangana.

== Route ==
Nakrekal, Arvapally, Tungaturti, Mahbubabad, Narsampet, Mallampalli.

== Junctions ==
NH 65 Terminal near Nakrekal.
NH 365B near Arvapally.
NH 365A near Kuravi.
NH 31 Terminal near Mallampalli.

== See also ==
- List of national highways in India
- List of national highways in India by state
