= Telangana State Southern Power Distribution Company Limited =

Indian state electric power distributor

Southern Power Distribution Company of Telangana Limited (TGSPDCL)
- Type: State-owned corporation
- Industry: Electric power distribution
- Founded: 2 June 2014; 12 years ago
- Headquarters: Hyderabad, Telangana, India
- Key people: Musharaff Ali Faruqui (Chairman & Managing Director)
- Products: Electricity
- Website: https://www.tgsouthernpower.org/

The Southern Power Distribution Company of Telangana Limited (TGSPDCL) is a state electric power distribution company owned by the Government of Telangana for the 15 southern districts of Telangana.

== History ==
TGSPDCL was incorporated under the Companies Act, 1956 as a public limited company on June 2, 2014 with headquarters at Hyderabad to carryout electricity distribution business as part of the unbundling of erstwhile A.P.S.E.B.

Musharraf Ali Faruqui, who is a 2014-batch IAS officer, was appointed as the chairman and managing director of TGSPDCL.

== Infrastructure ==
TGSPDCL has a vast infrastructure facility in its operating area with 1,605 33/11 KV substations, 3,102 power transformers, 1,220 33 KV feeders, 7,263 11 KV feeders, and around 4,22,003 distribution transformers of various capacities. In addition to these, solar power is also considered a priority in order to overcome the shortage of power in the state.

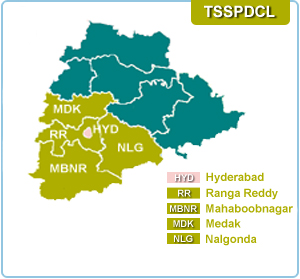
Map showing the districts of TGSPDCL (in yellowish green)

== TGSPDCL Network ==
TGSPDCL covers 15 districts: Mahabubnagar, Narayanpet, Nalgonda, Yadadri Bhuvanagiri, Suryapet, Siddipet, Medchal, Wanaparthy, Nagarkarnool, Jogulamba Gadwal, SangaReddy, Medak, Hyderabad, Vikarabad, and Rangareddy. It provides electricity to approximately 9.75 million consumers.

== See also ==
- Telangana Northern Power Distribution Company Limited
- Telangana Power Generation Corporation
- Transmission Corporation of Telangana
