= China Recycling Energy Corporation =

- Type: Public
- Traded as: Nasdaq: CREG
- Industry: Waste Management
- Founded: 1980; 46 years ago
- Headquarters: Xi'an, Shaanxi, China
- Area served: People’s Republic of China
- Key people: Ku Guohua (Chief Executive Officer, executive chairman); David Chong (CFO, principal accounting officer, secretary); Lanwei Li (Chief Operating Officer, VP, director of business and director)
- Products: Energy saving and recycling products
- Revenue: ▲US$50.21M (2014.1.24)
- Number of employees: 166 (2013.12)
- Website: creg-cn.com/en

China Recycling Energy Corporation was set up in May 1980 (formerly known as China Digital Wireless, Inc., and changed its name in March 2007) and now is based in Xi'an City, Shaanxi Province. The company focuses on markets in China about energy savings and recycling products and services, including design and finance the customized recycling systems for industrial applications, civil construction.

== History ==
The company began operations as a microbrewery of beers in 1980. On August 6, 2004, it changed its name from Boulder Acquisitions, Inc. to China Digital Wireless, Inc., marketing in pager and mobile phone distribution until May 10, 2007, when the company completely ceased these businesses. In December 2006, the company extended its business to the energy saving and recycling industry. On March 8, 2007, it finally changed its name to current China Recycling Energy Corporation.

In May 2004, Shanghai TCH was established; In November 2007, Xi’an TCH Energy Technology Co., Ltd was established; In November 2007, Shanghai TCH Energy Technology Co., Ltd. acquired Xingtai Huaxin Energy Tech Co., Ltd.; In April 2009, Erdos TCH Energy Saving and Development Co., Ltd. was established.

In November 2007, Carlyle Group made an investment in CREG through its Asia Funds, and becoming the second largest shareholder of CREG.

In March 2010, CREG was successfully listed on the NASDAQ Global Market. In August, 2013, the Company jointly established an energy recycling fund to invest in coke dry quenching (CDQ) energy recovery with Hongyuan Huifu Venture Capital Co., Ltd.

== Products ==
The company manufactures various energy-generation projects from the byproducts of industrial processes, such as blast furnace top gas recovery turbine (TRT) units (using exhaust pressure and heat emitted from industrial processes), waste gas power generation (WGPG) systems, combined cycle power plant (CCPP) systems, biomass power generation systems (BMPG), and waste heat power generation (WHPG) systems.

== Operations ==
The company has a strategic cooperation agreement for three-year exclusive support in business development with CGN Energy Service Co., Ltd. The subsidiaries of the company are: Sifang Holdings, Huahong New Energy Technology Co., Ltd. (Huahong) and Shanghai TCH ( with three subsidiaries: Xi’an TCH Energy Technology Company, Ltd (Xi’an TCH) and Xingtai Huaxin Energy Tech Co., Ltd. (Huaxin), and Xi’an TCH’s subsidiary Erdos TCH Energy Saving Development Co., Ltd (Erdos TCH)).

In October 2011, China Recycling Energy Corporation completed an acquisition of a 12-megawatt biomass power generation system from Shenqiu Yuneng Thermal Power Co., Ltd.

In June 2011, the system of the project ZhongBao was sold to and leased back from Cinda Financial Leasing Co., Ltd.

== Awards ==
In September 2012, China Recycling Energy Corp’s subsidiary, Xi'an TCH Energy Technology Company, won Major Technology Innovation Award for its Low Temperature Waste Heat Power Generation technology for cement production line in Shaanxi Province.
