= Chongqing Road Engineering Group =

Chinese construction company

Chongqing Road Engineering Group (commonly abbreviated as Yulu Group or CREG) (Chinese: 重庆市公路工程集团,渝路集团) is one of the largest individually owned construction groups in the western China region. The company's headquarters is in Yubei District of Chongqing, a provincial-level municipality of the People's Republic of China.

== Overview ==
CREG specializes as a construction supplier in road constructing and public works. The group is also qualified for transportation, bridges and tunnels, roadbeds, pavements, ports, residence buildings, express way, municipal projects, post-disaster reconstruction, industrial parks, etc. It is the only construction group in Chongqing that has obtained the certificate of contracting oversea projects and dispatching labor to other countries.

The Group consists of several exclusive-owned or shareholding subsidiaries as follows: infrastructure investment, bituminous concrete, pavement materials, central laboratory, real estate development and tourism. Its registered capital of 130 million RMB, total assets over 1,000 million RMB and output value over 2,000 million RMB each year, with more than five hundreds of various large project machines and special transport vehicles.

== Board chairman ==
Mr Wei Lu, the board chairman of Chongqing Road Engineering Group, is a deputy to the National People's Congress of Chongqing.

== International activities ==
More than 30 years after its establishment, the Group has engaged in the construction of tens of expressways, the reconstruction and expansion of highways extending hundreds of miles in Chongqing and Sichuan Province. In addition, the Group has also undertaken construction projects of bridges, ports, dykes, houses and skyscrapers. In 2003 the group obtained the certificate of contracting overseas projects and dispatching labor. In 2004, the Group went out of China and undertook the National Road Construction in Uganda successfully. In 2007, the Group won the 3,000 Housing project of the central government of Gabon. Now the group is exploring markets in Sudan, Pakistan, Cameroon, and Dubai.

== Achievements ==
In 2008, the Group constructed the Mianyang to Beichuan Highway. It is an important post disaster reconstruction project after the 2008 Sichuan earthquake and directly funded by Central Government in Beijing. Both CPC General Secretary Hu Jintao and Premier Wen Jiabao inspected and visited the project during the construction and after its completion.

== List of some projects ==
CREG has been involved in the following projects:

- Chongqing Inner Ring Expressway
- Chongqing Outer Ring Expressway
- Chongqing Inner Ring Expressway Nanshan Flyover
- Chongqing Outer Ring Expressway Zhaizipo Flyover
- Tibet Dangna Highway
- Yuxiang (Chongqing to Hunan) Expressway
- Chongqing Caotong Bridge (World Bank Project)
- Mianyang to Beichuan Qiang Autonomous County Highway (Post disaster reconstruction)
- State Expressway 108
- Uganda National Expressway 07
- Uganda National Expressway 08
- Chengyu Chengdu (from Chengdu to Chongqing)]
- Chengdu Shuangliu Nanbei Avenue
- Chengdu Longquanyi Nanbei Avenue
