= National Highway 365A (India) =

National highway in India

National Highway 365A
- Map of the National Highway in red

Route information
- Length: 76 km (47 mi)

Major junctions
- South end: Kodad
- North end: Kuravi

Location
- Country: India
- States: Telangana

Highway system
- Roads in India; Expressways; National; State; Asian
← NH 65	→ NH 365

National Highway 365A, commonly called NH 365A is a national highway in India. It is a spur road of National Highway 65. NH-365A traverses the state of Telangana in India.

== Route ==
Kodad - Nelakondapalli - khammam - Kuravi.

== Junctions ==
Terminal with National Highway 65 near Kodad.

Terminal with National Highway 365 near Kuravi.

== See also ==
- List of national highways in India
