= Tripura Electricity Regulatory Commission =

Governing body for electricity in Tripura, India

Agency overview
- Formed: 31 May 2004; 22 years ago
- Jurisdiction: Tripura Government
- Headquarters: Bidyut Bhavan Complex, Agartala
- Employees: Classified
- Agency executives: D. Radhakrishna, Chairman; Jiban Krishna Sen, Member; Mina Debbarma, Secretary
- Website: https://terc.tripura.gov.in/

Tripura Electricity Regulatory Commission (TERC) is a governing body to control certain regulatory and safety functions related to the power sector in the state of Tripura, India. It was incorporated under the Electricity Regulatory Commission Act, 1998.

== See also ==
- ONGC Tripura Power Company
