= CREG1 =

Protein-coding gene in humans

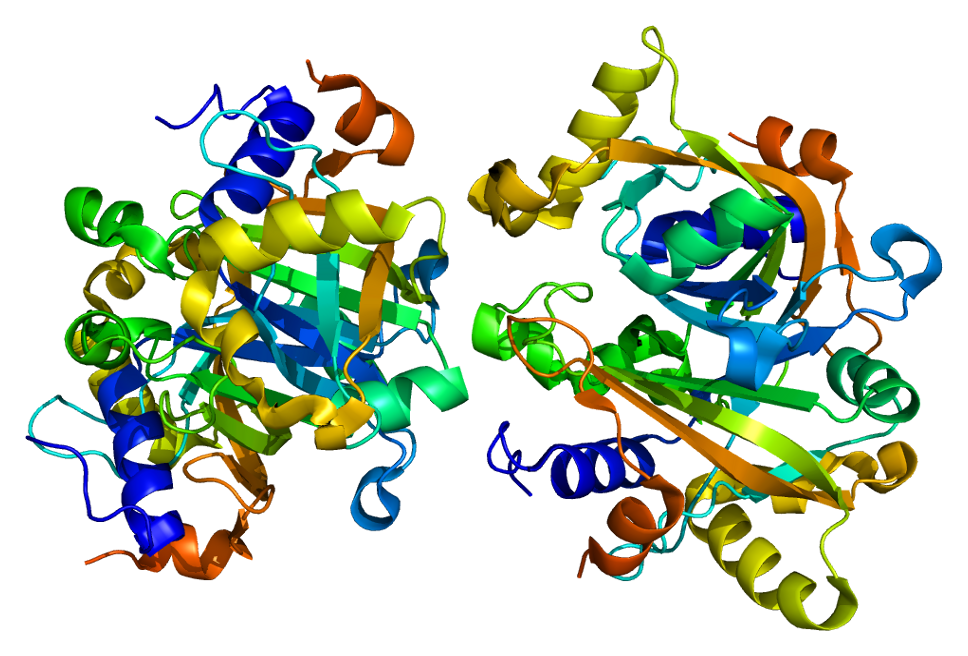

Identifiers
- Aliases: CREG1, CREG, cellular repressor of E1A stimulated genes 1
- External IDs: OMIM: 618055; MGI: 1344382; GeneCards: CREG1
Available structures
PDB	Ortholog search: PDBe RCSB
PDB	List of PDB id codes 1XHN

Gene location (Human)
Chr.	Chromosome 1 (human)
Band	1q24.2	Start	167,529,117 bp
Band	1q24.2	End	167,553,805 bp

Gene location (Mouse)
Chr.	Chromosome 1 (mouse)
Band	1|1 H2.3	Start	165,591,315 bp
Band	1|1 H2.3	End	165,602,877 bp
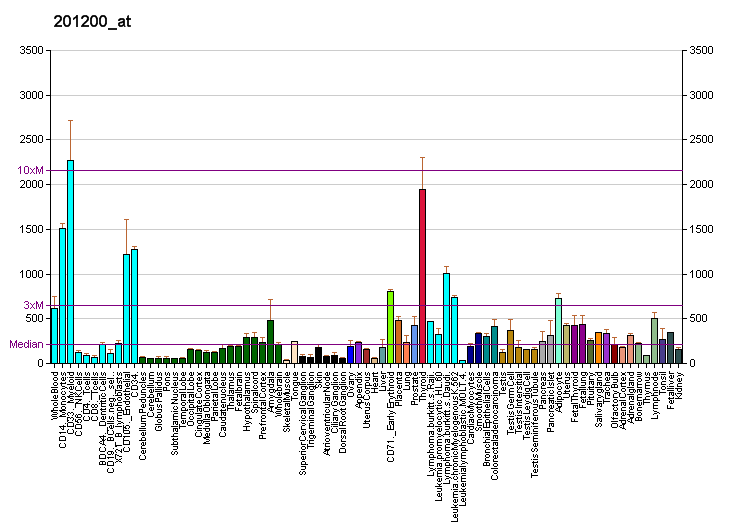
RNA expression pattern
Bgee	Human / Mouse (ortholog); Top expressed in: skin of thigh; hair follicle; vulva; skin of arm; gallbladder; parotid gland; lower lobe of lung; skin of hip; gingival epithelium; trabecular bone / Top expressed in: blood; stroma of bone marrow; left lobe of liver; epithelium of stomach; fetal liver hematopoietic progenitor cell; transitional epithelium of urinary bladder; saccule; otic placode; lacrimal gland; tibiofemoral joint; More reference expression data
BioGPS	More reference expression data
Gene ontology
Molecular function	transcription factor binding; transcription corepressor activity
Cellular component	extracellular exosome; transcription regulator complex; extracellular region; extracellular space; azurophil granule lumen
Biological process	regulation of transcription by RNA polymerase II; multicellular organism development; regulation of growth; cell population proliferation; regulation of transcription, DNA-templated; negative regulation of nucleic acid-templated transcription; neutrophil degranulation
Sources:Amigo / QuickGO
Orthologs
Databases	NCBI: entry; OMA: entry
Species	Human	Mouse
Entrez	8804	433375
Ensembl	ENSG00000143162	ENSMUSG00000040713
UniProt	O75629	O88668
RefSeq (mRNA)	NM_003851	NM_011804
RefSeq (protein)	NP_003842	NP_035934
Location (UCSC)	Chr 1: 167.53 – 167.55 Mb	Chr 1: 165.59 – 165.6 Mb
PubMed search
- Wikidata
View/Edit Human	View/Edit Mouse

Protein CREG1 (Cellular Repressor of E1A-stimulated Genes 1) is a protein that in humans is encoded by the CREG1 gene.

The adenovirus E1A protein both activates and represses gene expression to promote cellular proliferation and inhibit differentiation. The protein encoded by this gene antagonizes transcriptional activation and cellular transformation by E1A. This protein shares limited sequence similarity with E1A and binds both the general transcription factor TBP and the tumor suppressor pRb in vitro. This gene may contribute to the transcriptional control of cell growth and differentiation.
