= Mallampalli, Warangal district =

Mallampally
- village
- Country: India
- State: Telangana
- District: Warangal

Languages
  - Official: Telugu
- Time zone: UTC+5:30 (IST)

Mallampalli is a village and a mandal in Mulugu district in the state of Telangana in India.
