= Telangana Pollution Control Board =

Agency overview
- Formed: 7 July 2014 (12 years ago)
- Jurisdiction: Government of Telangana
- Headquarters: Hyderabad, Telangana, India
- Minister responsible: Konda Surekha, (Hon'ble Minister for Forest, Environment, and Endowments), Government of Telangana
- Agency executive: K. Rama Krishna Rao, IAS., Chairman of the Board
- Parent agency: Department of Environment, Forests, Science and Technology (EFS&T), Government of Telangana
- Website: tspcb.cgg.gov.in

The Telangana Pollution Control Board (TGPCB) is a statutory authority tasked with enforcing environmental laws and regulating pollution control measures within the state of Telangana, India. It operates under the administrative control of the state's Department of Environment, Forests, Science and Technology (EFS&T). Politically, the agency falls under the purview of the State Cabinet Minister for Forest and Environment, Konda Surekha. Structurally, the sitting Chief Secretary to the Government of Telangana serves as the ex-officio Chairman of the board.

== History ==
TGPCB was established under Section 4 of the Water (Prevention & Control of Pollution) Act, 1974 and under Section 5 of the Air (Prevention & Control of Pollution) Act, 1981, on 07-07-2014.

== Responsibilities ==
The Board has the responsibility of implementing a series of Environmental Acts and Rules:

- Water Act
- Air Act
- Environment Protection Act
- Hazardous Waste Rules
- Bio Medical Waste Rules
- Municipal Solid Waste Rules
- Plastic Manufacture, Sale and Usage Rules
- E-Waste (Management and Handling) Rules, 2011.

== Functions ==
Some of the functions of Telangana Pollution Board are :

- To encourage, conduct and participate in investigations and research relating to problems of water pollution and prevention, control or abatement of water pollution
- Lay down, modify or annul effluent standards for the sewage and trade effluents and for the quality of receiving waters resulting from the discharge of effluents and to classify waters of the State
- To advise the State Government with respect to the location of any industry the carrying on of which is likely to pollute a stream
- To evolve methods of utilisation of sewage and suitable trade effluents in agriculture

== See also ==
- Awaaz Foundation
