= Electricity and Gas Regulation Commission =

- Company type: Regulatory organisation
- Industry: Electricity, gas, utilities, regulation
- Founded: January 24th, 2005
- Headquarters: Algiers, Algeria
- Key people: Nadjib Otmane (Chairman)
- Website: www.creg.gov.dz

The Algerian Electricity and Gas Regulation Commission (CREG) has been created under the law n° 02-01 of 5 February 2002 relative to electricity and gas distribution. CREG is an independent body with a legal status and a financial autonomy. It is vested with three main missions:

- Realization and control of public service,
- Advising the authorities on organisation and functioning of the electricity and Algerian gas market,
- Supervision and control of the respect of laws and regulations related to the electricity and the national gas market.

CREG has begun its activities after his installation by the prime minister on 24 January 2005. CREG is managed by a steering committee constituted of a chairman and three (03) directors appointed by presidential decree on proposition of the Minister in charge of Energy. An advisory council is instituted within the regulation commission. It is composed of two (02) representatives of the relevant ministerial departments and of all interested parties (operators, consumers, employees).

The composition and financing of the advisory council are defined by legal ways.

The main competences and functions of the regulation commission are:

1. Permits / Concessions

2. Demand forecasts / Investment planning

3. Remuneration of operators and tariffs

4. Access to networks / Markets

5. Quality, regulations /Technical and environmental control

6. Consumer protection

A conciliation department for conflicts resulting from the implementation of the regulations particularly those relative to access to networks, tariffs and remuneration of operators;

An arbitration chamber, on request from the parties, rules on conflicts which may arise among operators except for those related to contractual rights and obligations.
