= Hyderabad Metropolitan Water Supply and Sewerage Board =

Indian public water and sewerage provider

Hyderabad Metropolitan Water Supply and Sewerage Board (HMWSSB) was established on 1 November 1989, in Hyderabad, India. It looks for the supply of water to the household and sewerage services of the city of Hyderabad.

HMWSSB was formed by the Andhra Pradesh Government with the provisions of Hyderabad Metropolitan Water Supply and Sewerage Act 1989 (Act No.15 of 1989).

== See also ==
- GHMC
