= Punjab State Electricity Regulatory Commission =

Regulatory body in Punjab, India

Punjab Electricity Regulatory Commission
- Punjab Electricity Regulatory Commission logo
- Established: 1986
- Jurisdiction: Punjab
- Location: Punjab Electricity Regulatory Commission,1st Floor, Site No 3, Sector 18-A, Madhya Marg, Chandigarh - 160018.
- Judge term length: 3 years from the date of entering office or up to 65 years of age (whichever is earlier)
- Website: http://pserc.gov.in/

Chairman, Punjab Electricity Regulatory Commission
- Currently: Sh.Sanjay Gupta

Punjab State Electricity Regulatory Commission is an autonomous, statutory and regulatory body constituted for ensuring generation and distribution of electricity in state of Punjab. Punjab Electricity Regulatory Commission is formed as per Constitution of India by notification in official gazette in accordance with Electricity Regulatory Commissions Act, 1998. The commission is vested with legislative and judicial powers to resolve conflicts between license holders of production and distribution of electricity, or consumers and electricity distribution entities and with authority to draft regulations and sub ordinate regulations. The President and other members of State Electricity Regulatory Commission (India) are appointed by Government of Punjab in consultation with the Chief Justice of state High Court.

== History and objective ==
Punjab Electricity Regulatory Commission is formed with the following objectives:

- Acts as a regulator for distribution licensees during the purchase and procurement of electricity by them.
- Facilitates during transmission of electricity between different states.
- Facilitates issuing of licenses to transmission and distribution licensees applicants and electricity traders within the state.
- Fix the rates during wholesale, bulk or retail generation of electricity and its supply, transmission and wheeling within the state.
- Resolve conflicts between the licensees and/or the generating companies.
- Integrate state grid codes with the grid code designed by Central Electricity Regulatory Commission (CERC) .
- Streamlining electricity tariff.
- Transparency in designing subsidy related policies.
- Promoting environmental policies in matters relating to electricity.
- Any other matters connected or incidental with it.

== Advisory role ==
Punjab Electricity Regulatory Commission follows below advisory role:

- Designing schemes promoting electricity industry related investment.
- Planning initiatives in Electrical industry which promotes competition and improves efficiency and brings economy in activities.
- Initiating restructuring and reorganization in Electricity industry.
- Guiding state government in any issues referred to it which are related to generation, transmission, distribution and trading of electricity in the state.

== Powers ==
Punjab Electricity Regulatory Commission acts as a substitute to civil courts and is vested with legislative and judicial powers to resolve conflicts between license holders of production and distribution of electricity, or consumers and electricity distribution entities and with authority to draft regulations and sub ordinate regulations. They can also issue orders for the recovery of amounts from power consuming entities which are due to electricity generating companies.

== Composition ==
The Composition of Punjab Electricity Regulatory Commission

1. Chairperson

2. Two members.

Chairperson will be appointed by state Government in consultation with the Chief Justice of state High Court. The eligibility for Chairperson is that he should be serving or should have served as Judge in any High Court and other members should have good ability, integrity and standing. They should also be proficient experience and expertise knowledge in subjects of accountancy, law, commerce, economics, industry, administration and public affairs and problem solving ability in same.

The Chairperson and members of State Electricity Regulatory Commission (India) are not permitted to hold any other office of profit or any position which is connected with any political party and are also barred from carrying on any business or continuing any profession in any field.

Sh. Sanjay Gupta is the Chairman of the Punjab Electricity Regulatory Commission.
