= Transmission Corporation of Telangana =

Transmission Corporation Of Telangana Limited (TGTRANSCO)
- Company type: Government-owned Corporation-PSU
- Industry: Electricity transmission
- Founded: 2 June 2014
- Headquarters: Khairtabad, Hyderabad, India
- Area served: Telangana
- Key people: ▪️Sri D.Krishna Bhaskar, IAS (Chairman And Managing Director)
- Products: transmission, distribution and energy trading
- Owner: Government of Telangana
- Parent: Government of Telangana
- Website: https://tgtransco.com

The Transmission Corporation of Telangana Limited (TGTRANSCO) is the electricity transmission company of the Government of Telangana, Telangana state in India. It has ceased to do power trading and has retained with powers of controlling system operations of power transmission.

The Transmission Corporation Of Telangana Limited (TGTRANSCO) has been incorporated under companies Act, 2013, on 19 May 2014 and commenced its operations from 2 June 2014.

== History ==
The erstwhile Andhra Pradesh State Electricity Board which came into existence in 1959 was responsible for generation, transmission and distribution of electricity. Under the Electricity Sector Reforms agenda, government of Andhra Pradesh promulgated Andhra Pradesh Electricity Reforms Act, 1998. The erstwhile APSEB was unbundled into one generating company (APGENCO), one transmission company (APTRANSCO) and four distribution companies (APDISCOMs) as part of the reform process.

APTRANSCO came into existence on 1.02.1999. From February 1999 to June 2005 APTRANSCO remained as single buyer in the state-purchasing power from various generators and selling it to DISCOMs in accordance with the terms and conditions of the individual PPAs at Bulk Supply Tariff (BST) rates. Subsequently, in accordance with the Third Transfer Scheme notified by GOAP, APTRANSCO ceased to do power trading and has retained powers of controlling system operations of power transmission

As per AP Reorganization Act 2014, APTRANSCO was divided into TGTRANSCO and APTRANSCO. Accordingly TGTRANSCO was established as a company w.e.f 2-6-2014 for the state of Telangana.

== See also ==
- Telangana Power Generation Corporation
