= Kapus =

Kapus may be:

- the plural of kapu
- a surname; notable people include:
  - Krisztián Kapus
  - Franz Kapus
  - Richard Kapuš

== See also ==
- Kappus
