= Chintamadaka =

Village in Telangana, India

- Village
- Location in Telangana, India Chintamadaka (India)
- Coordinates: 18.0315°N 78.8482°E
- Country: India
- State: Telangana
- District: Siddipet
- Mandal: Siddipet (Rural)
- District formation: 11 October 2016

Government
  - Type: Gram Panchayat

Area
  - Total: 6.92 km^{2} (2.67 sq mi)

Population (2011)
  - Total: 2,335
  - Density: 337/km^{2} (874/sq mi)

Languages
  - Official: Telugu
- Time zone: UTC+5:30 (IST)
- Postal code: 502107
- Vehicle registration: TS
- Nearest city: Siddipet
- Census village code: 572976

Chintamadaka is a village in Siddipet district of the Indian state of Telangana. It is birthplace of K. Chandrashekar Rao, first Chief Minister of Telangana. The village is located approximately 15 kilometers from the district headquarters of Siddipet and about three hours north of Hyderabad.

== Administration ==
Chintamadaka is part of the Siddipet (Rural) mandal in Siddipet district. Prior to the reorganisation of districts in Telangana on 11 October 2016, the village was in Medak district.

== Demographics ==
According to the 2011 census, Chintamadaka had a population of 2,335 across 579 households. The village covers a total area of 692 hectares (6.92 km²) According to the 2023 news report estimated the village had approximately 850–900 families.

== Notable people ==
- K. Chandrashekar Rao (born 17 February 1954) He became the first Chief Minister of Telangana when the state was formed on 2 June 2014.

== Infrastructure and developments ==
During a visit to the village on 22 July 2019, KCR special developments for Chintamadaka, including ₹10 lakh per family for self employment and 2,000 two-bedroom houses. He also allocated ₹50 crore for the development of the village, laid the foundation stone for a BC Gurukul Residencial School and inaugurated a newly-constructed primary school.

Following the Chief Minister's suggestion, the State Forest Department announced plans in August 2019 to develop urban park and forest on 98 acres in Chintamadaka, including recreation facilities, a children's play area, a walking track and Smriti Vanam (memorial garden).

In December 2019, Minister T. Harish Rao inaugurated several completed projects in the village, including community halls for SC, Mudiraj and Reddy communities, a shelter and laid foundation stones for a graveyard and function hall. Statues of Chhatrapati Shivaji Maharaja and Telangana Thalli were also unveiled.

=== Vehicles distribution ===
In February 2020, Finance Minister T. Harish Rao distributed vehicles to 716 families in Chintamadaka and surrounding villages under the self employment scheme, including 23 cars, 31 tractors, 22 JCBs, 32 harvesters and 23 goods carriers.

== Healthcare ==
In July 2019, the district administration announced the plans to prepare a comprehensive health profile for all residents of Chintamadaka, which would make it the first village in Telangana to have such documented health data. During his July 2019, visit KCR stated that officials had estimated there were about 1800 families in Chintamadaka (compared to 579 households in 2011 census). He also announced that medical and eye camps would be held in the village.

== Development status ==
A 2021 ground investigation by The News Minute found that approximately 90% of families in Chintamadaka had received monetary benefits under KCR's 2019 announcement. Beneficiaries reported receiving ₹8 lakh, with the remaining ₹2 lakh promised later. One villager used the funds to start a dairy farm, while another established a poultry farm, enabling him to remain in the village rather than migrate to Hyderabad for work. Regarding housing, out of 533 applications, 154 houses had been completed by August 2021, though construction had slowed due to pending payments to contractors.

== Political culture ==
The village is known for its strong support for KCR and his party, the Bharat Rashtra Samithi (BRS). According to a 2023 report, no candidates from opposition parties have contested local elections in Chintamadaka since the TRS (now BRS) was founded. The village predominantly displays BRS flags.

The village's political allegiance was demonstrated in April 2017, when residents staged a dharna (protest) and blocked Telugu Desam Party leader A. Revanth Reddy from entering the village, raising slogans of "Revanth go back". The family of a deceased farmer also refused to accept financial assistance offered by the opposition leader.

According to a 2021 report, new housing colonies in the village were established along caste lines, including separate colonies for Mudiraj, BC, SC, and OC communities.

== Recent events ==
In December 2023, a large number of residents met KCR at his farmhouse in Erravelli. In September 2025, MLC Kalvakuntla Kavitha visited the village, played Bathukamma with residents, and stated that Chintamadaka could become her "karmabhoomi" (place of action) in the future. She also remarked that neither Chintamadaka nor Siddipet should be treated as anyone's private property.
