= K. Chandrashekar Rao =

1st chief Minister of Telangana from 2014 to 2023

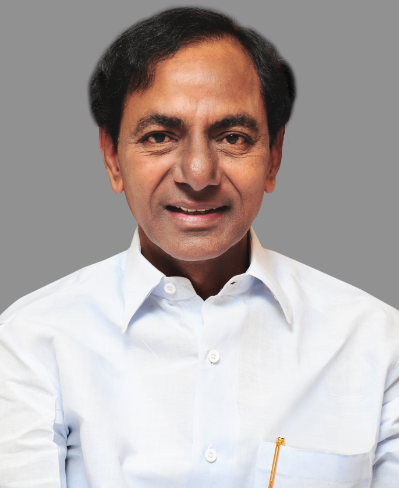
- Official portrait, April 2017

3rd Leader of the Opposition, Telangana Legislative Assembly
- Incumbent
- Assumed office 16 December 2023
- Governor: Tamilisai Soundararajan (2023-2024); C. P. Radhakrishnan (additional charge; 2024); Jishnu Dev Varma (2024-2026); Shiv Pratap Shukla (2026-incumbent)
- Chief Minister: Revanth Reddy
- Preceded by: vacant Mallu Bhatti Vikramarka (2018-19)

1st President of the Bharat Rashtra Samithi
- Incumbent
- Assumed office 5 October 2022
- Working President: K. T. Rama Rao
- Preceded by: office established

1st Chief Minister of Telangana
- In office 2 June 2014 – 7 December 2023
- Governor: E. S. L. Narasimhan (2014-2019); Dr. Tamilisai Soundararajan (2019-2023)
- Deputy: M. Mahmood Ali (until 12 December 2018); T. Rajaiah (until 25 January 2015); Kadiyam Srihari (until 12 December 2018)
- Preceded by: office established (Kiran Kumar Reddy as Chief Minister of United Andhra Pradesh)
- Succeeded by: Anumula Revanth Reddy

Member of Telangana Legislative Assembly
- Incumbent
- Assumed office 2 June 2014
- Preceded by: Tumkunta Narsa Reddy (constituency shifted from Andhra Pradesh)
- Constituency: Gajwel

Union Minister of Labour & Employment
- In office 27 November 2004 – 24 August 2006
- Prime Minister: Manmohan Singh
- Preceded by: Sis Ram Ola
- Succeeded by: Manmohan Singh

Union Minister of Ports, Shipping & Waterways
- In office 23 May 2004 – 25 May 2004
- Prime Minister: Manmohan Singh
- Preceded by: Shatrughan Sinha
- Succeeded by: T. R. Baalu

Member of Parliament, Lok Sabha
- In office 16 May 2009 – 16 May 2014
- Preceded by: D. Vittal Rao
- Succeeded by: A. P. Jithender Reddy
- Constituency: Mahbubnagar, Andhra Pradesh
- In office 16 May 2004 – 16 May 2009
- Preceded by: C. Vidyasagar Rao
- Succeeded by: Ponnam Prabhakar
- Constituency: Karimnagar, Andhra Pradesh

President of the Telangana Rashtra Samithi
- In office 27 April 2001 – 5 October 2022
- Working President: K. T. Rama Rao (from 15 December 2018)
- Preceded by: office established
- Succeeded by: office abolished

15th Deputy Speaker of Andhra Pradesh Legislative Assembly
- In office 17 November 1999 – 1 May 2001
- Speaker: K. Prathibha Bharathi(1999-2004)
- Preceded by: N. Md. Farooq
- Succeeded by: Koppula Harishwar Reddy

Minister of Transport, Government of Andhra Pradesh
- In office 19 December 1996 – 11 October 1999
- Governor: Krishan Kant; Gopala Ramanujam; C. Rangarajan
- Chief Minister: N. Chandrababu Naidu
- Preceded by: P. Chandrasekhar
- Succeeded by: Alimineti Madhava Reddy

Minister of Drought & Relief, Government of Andhra Pradesh
- In office 1987–1988
- Governor: Kumudben Joshi
- Chief Minister: N. T. Rama Rao

Member of Andhra Pradesh Legislative Assembly
- In office 10 March 1985 – 13 May 2004
- Preceded by: Ananthula Madan Mohan
- Succeeded by: T. Harish Rao
- Constituency: Siddipet

Personal details
- Born: 17 February 1954 (age 72) Chintamadaka, Hyderabad State, India (present-day Telangana)
- Party: Bharat Rashtra Samithi (since 2001)
- Other political affiliations: Telugu Desam Party (1983–2001); Indian National Congress (1980–1983)
- Spouse: K. Shobha (m. 1969)
- Children: K. T. Rama Rao (son); K. Kavitha (daughter)
- Relatives: K. Himanshu Rao (grandchild); T. Harish Rao (nephew); Joginapally Santosh Kumar (nephew)
- Education: Osmania University

Kalvakuntla Chandrashekar Rao (born 17 February 1954), commonly known as KCR, is an Indian politician currently representing the Gajwel Assembly constituency and who is first Chief Minister of Telangana who served for almost ten years. He is the founding leader of the Bharat Rashtra Samithi, a state party in India. serving as the third leader of the opposition in the Telangana Legislative Assembly from 2023. He is also the father of politicians Kalvakuntla Kavitha and K.Taraka Rama Rao.

== Early life ==
Rao was born to Ragava Rao and Venkatama on 17 February 1954 in Chintamadaka, Hyderabad State (present-day Telangana). He is of the Padmanayaka Velama caste. Rao has nine sisters and one elder brother. He attained an MA degree in Telugu literature from Osmania University, Hyderabad.

== Political career ==
=== Congress Party ===
Rao started his career with the Youth Congress in Medak. He stood by Indira Gandhi after her defeat in the 1977 Lok Sabha polls.

=== Telugu Desam Party ===
Roa joined the Telugu Desam Party (TDP) in 1983, following its formation by N. T. Rama Rao. He contested as a TDP candidate (Note: TDP was not a recognised political party in the 1983 election. Therefore, its candidates were officially recorded as Independents, although they contested on the party's Cycle symbol with TDP's B Form.) in the 1983 Andhra Pradesh Legislative Assembly election from the Siddipet Assembly constituency, losing to Ananthula Madan Mohan, a Congress candidate, by 877 votes. He subsequently won four consecutive Assembly elections from Siddipet between 1985 and 1999. From 1987 to 1988, he served as the Minister of Drought and Relief in Chief Minister N. T. Rama Rao's cabinet. In 1990, he was appointed TDP convener for Medak, Nizamabad, and Adilabad districts. In 1996, he served as Transport minister in Chief Minister Nara Chandrababu Naidu's cabinet. He also served as the Deputy Speaker of the Andhra Pradesh Assembly from 2000 to 2001.

=== Jai Telangana movement ===
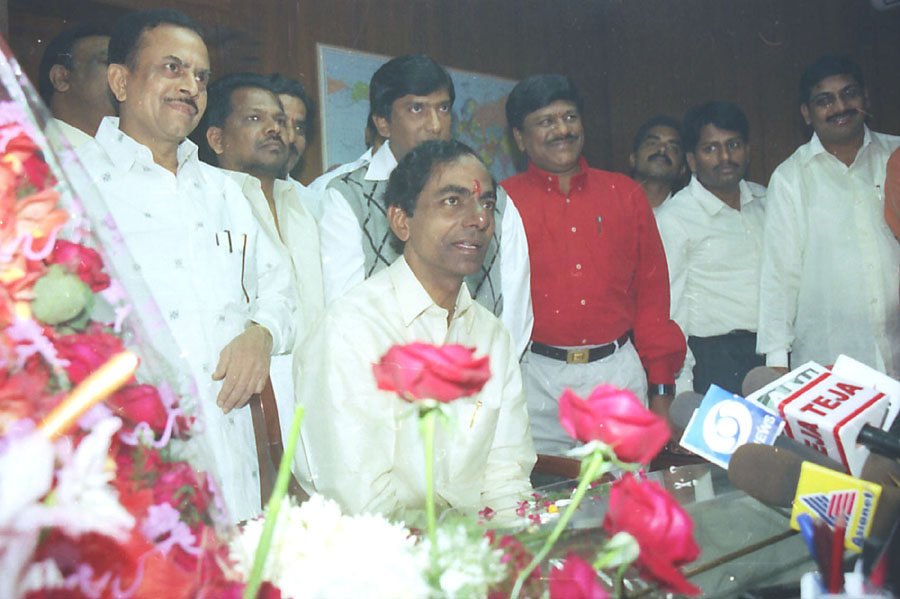
K. Chandrashekhar Rao assumes the office of Labour and Employment Minister in New Delhi on 28 November 2004

On 27 April 2001, Rao resigned from the Telugu Desam Party, leaving his position of Deputy Speaker. He stated that the people of the Telangana region were being discriminated against and believed that a separate state was the only solution. The same day, he formed the Telangana Rashtra Samithi (TRS) Party (now called the Bharat Rashtra Samithi) at Jala Drushyam, Hyderabad to achieve Telangana statehood. In the 2004 elections, he won from Siddipet and also the Karimnagar Lok Sabha constituency by election, both as a TRS candidate. The TRS contested the 2004 general elections in alliance with the Indian National Congress, with the Congress Party's promise of Telangana statehood. Rao was one of the five TRS candidates who were elected as MPs.

TRS was part of the United Progressive Alliance coalition government, led by Congress. Rao went on to become a Union Cabinet Minister of Labour and Employment in the UPA government. In 2006, the party withdrew from the coalition, stating that the Alliance was not inclined to support a separate Telangana state, and he resigned as an MP.

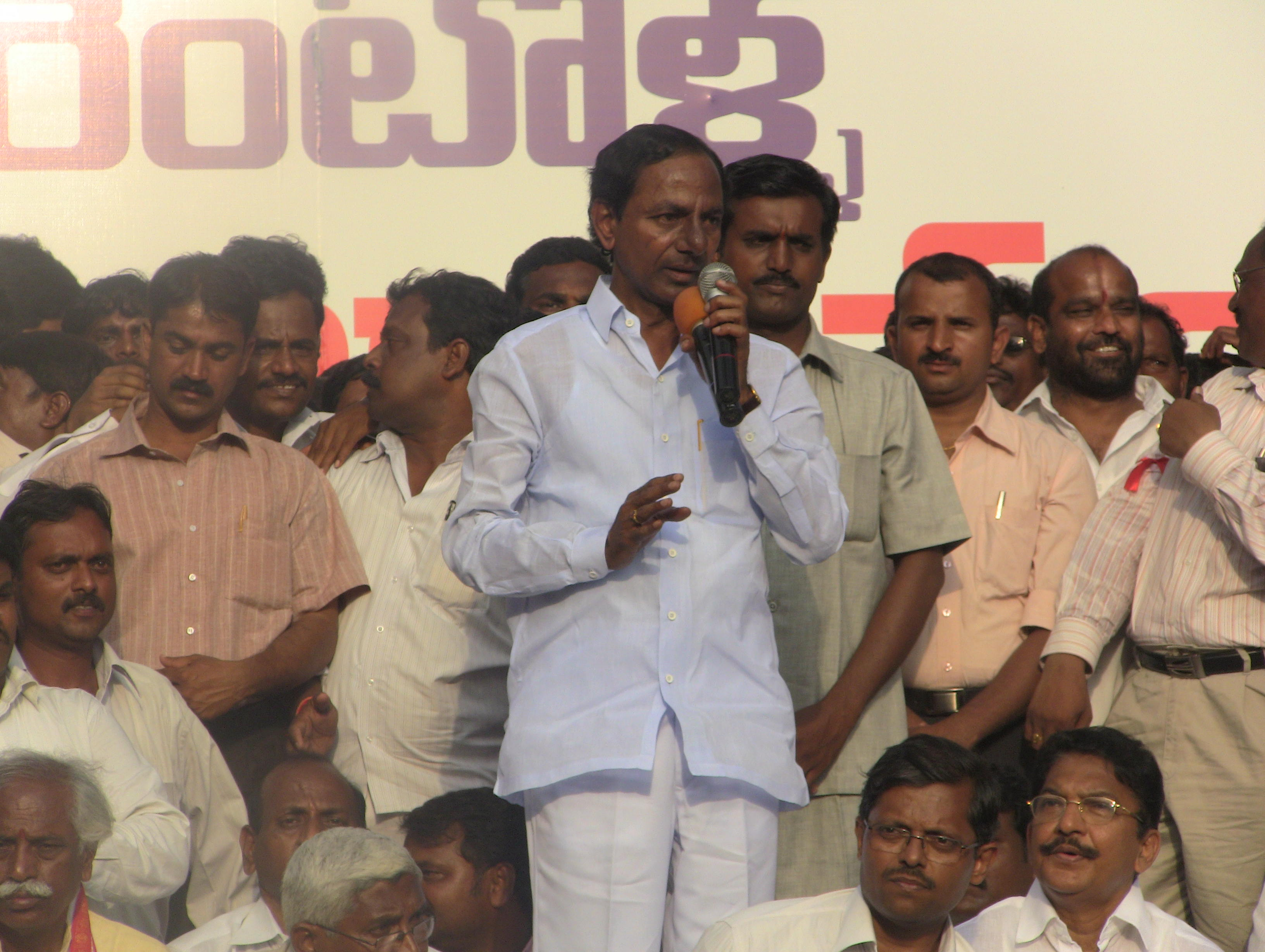
Rao addressing a public gathering during Telangana Agitation

In 2009, Rao won the Mahbubnagar Lok Sabha elections. In November 2009, he started a hunger strike, demanding the introduction of the Telangana Bill in the Indian Parliament. Eleven days later, the Central Government initiated the process to grant Telangana statehood.

On 16 May 2014, Rao was elected as MLA from Gajwel with a majority of 19,391 and as MP from Medak with a majority of 397,029.

In Telangana, the TRS, which led the campaign for a separate state for over a decade, received the most votes, winning 11 of the 17 Lok Sabha seats and 63 of the 119 Assembly seats.

=== Foray into national politics ===
In May 2019, ahead of the 2019 Indian general election, Rao attempted to set up Federal Front along with leaders of other regional political parties. The Front's aim was to bring a non-Congress, non-BJP alliance to power in the Central Government of India.

In June 2022, Rao announced plans for a national party. On 5 October 2022, the day of Vijayadashami, he renamed his party to Bharat Rashtra Samithi (BRS) at the party's Executive Council Meeting.

=== Chief Minister of Telangana (2014–2023) ===
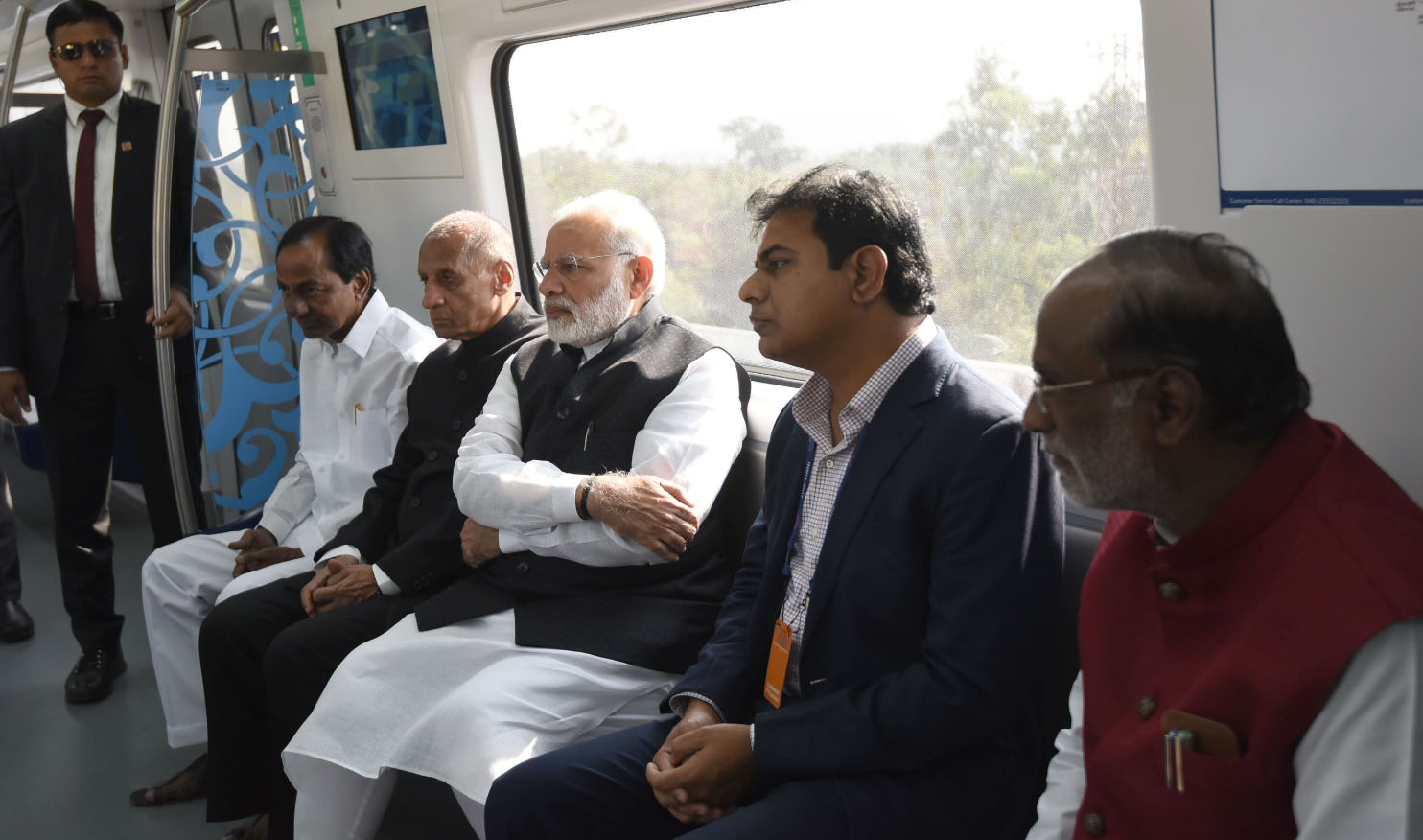
K. Chandrashekar Rao with Prime Minister Narendra Modi in Hyderabad Metro in 2017

Rao was sworn in as the first chief minister of the Telangana state on 2 June 2014. Rao, a staunch believer in astrology, numerology and vaastu, is reported to have fixed 12:57 PM for his inauguration as per the advice of priests to suit his lucky number 'six', since the sum of the digits is 'fifteen' and '1+5=6.' He was re-elected eight times as TRS president. In September 2018, he dissolved the Telangana Legislative Assembly, nine months before its term ends to go for an early election. In December 2018, he was re-elected as Chief Minister for the second term, after winning the 2018 Telangana Legislative Assembly election by a big margin.

Rao shaped the Telangana state to a high degree of development both economically and culturally, right from the formative years of the state since 2014. His welfare programs are aimed at reviving the rural economy and are focused on the development of each community. An intensive household survey, Samagra Kutumba Survey (SKS) was done in a single day on 19 August 2014 across the state to arrive at citizen information for rolling out welfare programs. The data collected pertaining to 94 parameters, covered one crore four lakh households in the State.

Rao had revived the Telangana history, culture and festivals. The native festival Bathukamma, the festival of flowers and Shakti, was declared as a state festival. In 2017, he declared Urdu to be the second official language of Telangana. The government spent Rs. 1,200 crore for the expansion of the Yadadri temple.

The Rao government has been described as populist, launching several welfare schemes.

Rao launched the Aarogya Lakshmi scheme on 1 January 2015. He launched multiple welfare schemes, such as the Double Bedroom Housing scheme, which aims to end slums in Telangana by providing free housing to the poor, the Kalyana Lakshmi - Shaadi Mubarak scheme, providing assistance to newlywed couples, the Rythu Bandhu scheme, providing assistance to farmers, and Aasara pension scheme, providing pensions to all senior citizens were also launched by the Rao government. On 16 August 2021, he launched the Dalit Bandu Scheme.

=== Post chief minister role (2024–present) ===
In the December 2023 Telangana Legislative elections, he contested from both Gajwel and Kamareddy constituencies. He won from Gajwel by defeating Etela Rajender, a former member of his party, by 45553 votes. In a major face-off, the two major candidates for the post of Chief Minister of Telangana KCR and Revanth Reddy were contesting against each other in the seat of Kamareddy. They both lost to K. V. Ramana Reddy, a member of the BJP. After his defeat to the Indian National Congress, he submitted his resignation on 3 December 2023 and Revanth Reddy formed the new ministry.

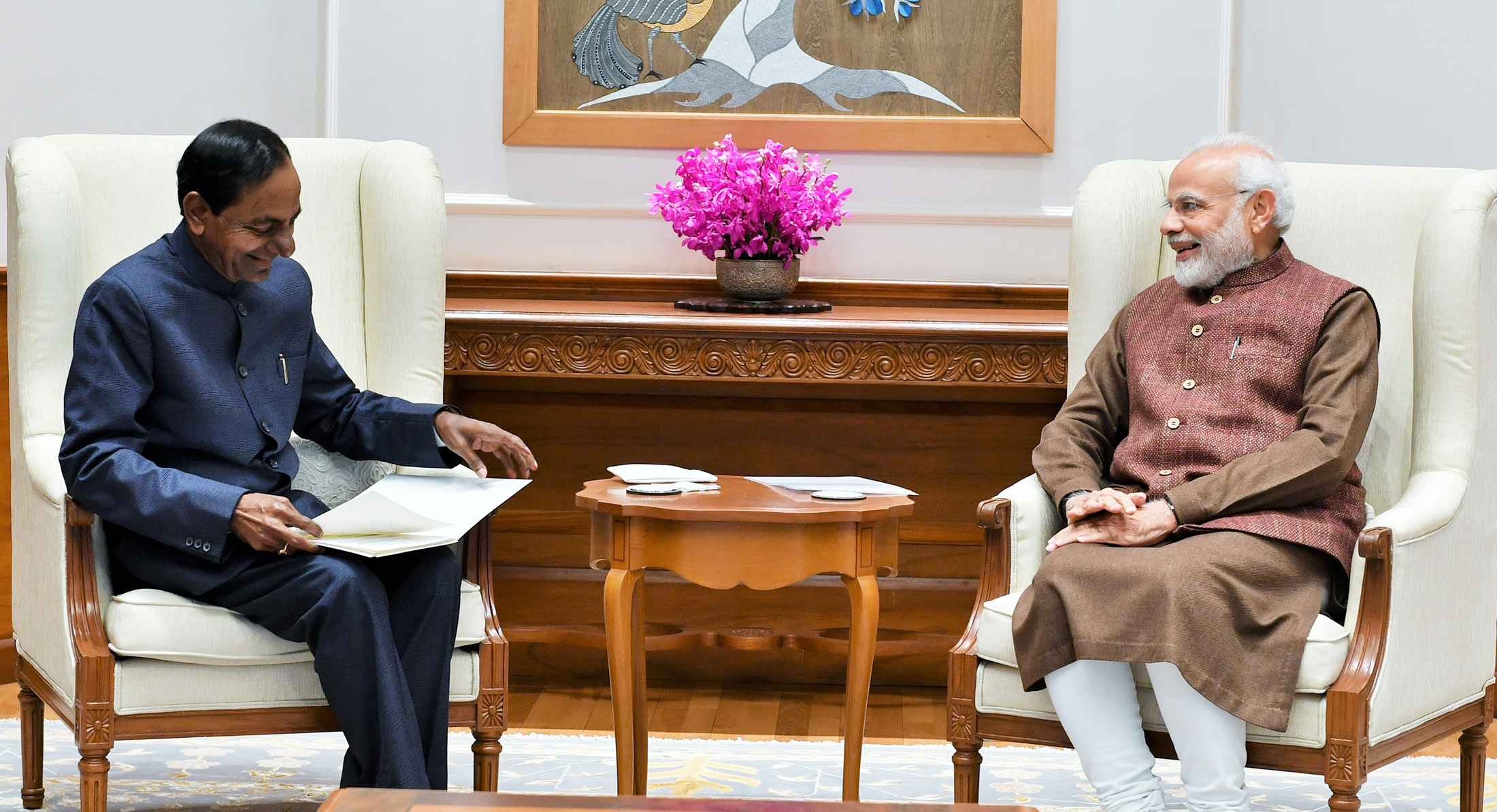
KCR calling on the Prime Minister Narendra Modi, in 2018

KCR took on a new role as leader of the opposition in the Telangana Legislative Assembly after his defeat, on 16 December 2023. Rao, who had previously stayed off social media, joined X (Twitter) and Instagram on 27 April 2024, coinciding with his party's 23rd anniversary in an attempt to reach more people. In June 2024, he declined an invitation by Chief Minister to participate in the state celebrations marking 10 years of the formation of the state and chose to participate in his party's celebrations.

In the 2024 Indian general elections, his party failed to secure a single seat, despite contesting in all 17 of Telangana's Lok Sabha Constituencies, compared to the 9 seats they won in the previous elections.

== Personal life ==
Rao is married to Shobha and has two children. His son, K. T. Rama Rao is a legislator from Sircilla. He was the cabinet minister for IT, Municipal Administration & Urban Development in Telangana second assembly. His daughter, Kavitha, served as M.P. from Nizamabad and is currently serving as a Member of Legislative Council, Nizamabad. His nephew, Harish Rao, is MLA from Siddipet. He served as Telangana's cabinet minister for finance in second assembly of Telangana. He is proficient in Telugu, English, Urdu, and Hindi. He lives with his family at his farm house at Erravelli in Medak district.

In 2015, Rao adopted Pratyusha, who was rescued from domestic violence. She was married in 2020.

In December 2023, he suffered a hip fracture after a fall at his farmhouse in Erravelli. He was admitted to Yashoda Hospitals, Hyderabad for treatment and was discharged after a week.

== Positions held ==
| Position | Duration |
|---|---|
| Leader of the Opposition (Telangana Legislative Assembly) | 16 December 2023 – Present |
| Chief Minister (Government of Telangana) | 2 June 2014 – 7 December 2023 (2 terms) |
| Member, 16th Lok Sabha | Re-elected on 16 May 2014 (3rd term); Resigned on 29 May 2014 |
| Member, 15th Lok Sabha | Re-elected in 2009 (2nd term); Leader, Telangana Rashtra Samithi Parliamentary Party, Lok Sabha; Member, Standing Committee on Energy (31 August 2009); Member, Rules Committee (23 September 2009) |
| Union Cabinet Minister, Labour and Employment | 27 November 2004 – 24 August 2006 |
| Member, 14th Lok Sabha | Elected in 2004; Resigned on 23 September 2006; Re-elected in bye-election on 7 December 2006; Resigned on 3 March 2008 |
| Convenor, New States National Front | 2003 |
| Deputy Speaker, Andhra Pradesh Legislative Assembly | 1999 – 2001 |
| Cabinet Minister, Transport, Govt. of Andhra Pradesh | 1997 – 2000 |
| Member, Committee on Public Undertakings | 1995 – 1996 |
| State Secretary, Telugu Desam Party (T.D.P.) | 1993 – 1994 |
| Chairman, Committee on Public Undertakings | 1992 – 1993 |
| District Party President, Telugu Desam Party (TDP) | 1989 – 1993 |
| Minister of Drought, Govt. of Andhra Pradesh | 1988 – 1989 |
| Minister of State, Govt. of Andhra Pradesh | 1987 – 1988 |
| Member, Andhra Pradesh Legislative Assembly | 1985; 1989; 1994; 1999; 2001 |
| Member, Telangana Legislative Assembly, (w.e.f. 2 June 2014) | 2014; 2018; 2023 |
| Chairman, Raghavapur Primary; Agriculture Cooperative Society (P.A.C.S.), Siddipet | 1982 |
| Vice-President, Andhra Pradesh Youth Congress | 1982 |

== Views ==
Rao is a Gandhian and has stated that the teachings of Mahatma Gandhi inspired him to follow a non-violent approach in his demands during the Telangana movement.

In 2019, Rao described Rahul Gandhi as the "biggest buffoon in the country" and Narendra Modi as the "most ineffective PM" in India's history.

Rao is a follower of Sri Vaishnavism and a devotee of Chinna Jeeyar, his guru in the tradition of Ramanuja. He has led efforts to rebuild major temples in Telangana, including Yadadri, Kondagattu, and Vemulawada.

== Controversies ==
=== Kaleshwaram project scam ===
During his tenure as Chief Minister of Telangana, Rao has undertaken an irrigation project as Kaleshwaram Lift Irrigation Project, which was touted as the world's largest multi-stage lift irrigation project. The Comptroller and Auditor General (CAG) of India has come out with a damning report on the project in Feb 2024, which says it was economically unviable from the start and details the massive cost overruns, possible undue benefits accrued to contractors for the supply and commissioning of pumps, motors, etc., and the poor planning involved. The project costs have likely exceeded to Rs. 1.47 lakh crores (US$17.698 billion), as against Rs. 81,911 crores (US$9.87 billion) projected to the Central Water Commission (CWC). This report was released within a year after the Medigadda barrage sank. The National Dam Safety Authority (NDSA) found that the Medigadda barrage is severely compromised, rendering it useless unless fully renovated.

=== Sheep distribution scam ===
Launched in 2017 by Rao himself, the Sheep Rearing Development Scheme (SRDS) focused on promoting rural livelihoods by giving subsidized sheep to eligible members. Using this scheme, beneficiaries are supposed to receive sheep with a 75 percent subsidy from the state government. The Comptroller and Auditor General of India (CAG) reported about the serious anomalies in the implementation of the scheme. The report cited various findings like falsified beneficiary records, increased transportation invoices, usage of non-commercial vehicles for transport, duplicate sheep tags, and allotments for fictitious beneficiaries.

The CAG report audit is limited to only 7 districts of the total 33, where the government's loss was estimated to be Rs. 253.93 crores. Proportionately, for all the 33 districts of Telangana, loss is calculated to surpass Rs. 1000 crores.

== Other work ==
Rao acted in the film Jai Bolo Telangana (2011) and gave lyrics for the song "Garadi Chesthundru". He also wrote a song in Kolimi (2015). He also gave lyrics for songs to promote Mission Kakatiya and for his 2018 poll campaign.

== Electoral performance ==
=== Lok Sabha ===
| Year | Constituency | Party | Votes | % | Opponent | Party | Votes | % | Result | Margin | % |
|---|---|---|---|---|---|---|---|---|---|---|---|
| 2014 | Medak | TRS | 657,492 | 55.20 | P. Shravan Reddy | INC | 260,463 | 21.87 | Won | +397,029 | +33.33 |
| 2009 | Mahabubnagar | TRS | 366,569 | 39.56 | D. Vittal Rao | INC | 346,385 | 37.39 | Won | +20,184 | +2.17 |
| 2008 (Note: By-election) | Karimnagar | TRS | 269,452 | 36.66 | T. Jeevan Reddy | INC | 153,687 | 34.51 | Won | +15,765 | +2.15 |
| 2006 | Karimnagar | TRS | 378,030 | 47.61 | T. Jeevan Reddy | INC | 176,448 | 22.23 | Won | +201,582 | +25.38 |
| 2004 | Karimnagar | TRS | 451,199 | 51.59 | C. Vidyasagar Rao | BJP | 320,031 | 36.60 | Won | +131,168 | +14.99 |

=== Legislative Assembly ===
| Year | Constituency | Party | Votes | % | Opponent | Party | Votes | % | Result | Margin | % |
|---|---|---|---|---|---|---|---|---|---|---|---|
| 2023 | Kamareddy | BRS | 59,911 | 31.06 | K. V. Ramana Reddy | BJP | 66,652 | 34.55 | Lost | -6,741 | -3.49 |
| 2023 | Gajwel | BRS | 111,684 | 48.05 | Etela Rajender | BJP | 66,653 | 28.68 | Won | +45,031 | +19.37 |
| 2018 | Gajwel | TRS | 125,444 | 60.45 | Pratap Reddy Vanteru | INC | 67,154 | 32.36 | Won | +58,290 | +28.09 |
| 2014 | Gajwel | TRS | 86,694 | 44.06 | Pratap Reddy Vanteru | TDP | 67,303 | 34.21 | Won | +19,391 | +9.85 |
| 2004 | Siddipet | TRS | 74,287 | 63.83 | Jilla Srinivas | TDP | 29,619 | 25.45 | Won | +44,668 | +38.38 |
| 2001 | Siddipet | TRS | 82,632 | 72.35 | M. Srinivas Reddy | TDP | 23,920 | 20.34 | Won | +58,712 | +52.01 |
| 1999 | Siddipet | TDP | 69,169 | 61.02 | M. Swamy Charan | INC | 41,614 | 36.71 | Won | +27,555 | +24.31 |
| 1994 | Siddipet | TDP | 64,645 | 60.91 | A. Madan Mohan | INC | 37,538 | 35.37 | Won | +27,107 | +25.54 |
| 1989 | Siddipet | TDP | 53,145 | 55.57 | A. Madan Mohan | INC | 39,329 | 41.12 | Won | +13,816 | +14.45 |
| 1985 | Siddipet | TDP | 45,215 | 57.39 | T. Mahender Reddy | INC | 29,059 | 36.88 | Won | +16,156 | +20.51 |
| 1983 | Siddipet | TDP | 27,889 | 39.10 | A. Madan Mohan | INC | 28,766 | 40.33 | Lost | -887 | -1.23 |

== Awards ==
- Popular Choice Award at CNN-IBN Indian of the Year 2014
- Agricultural leadership award 2017
- Economic Times Awards – Business reformer of the year 2018
- Asian Scientist 100, Asian Scientist, 2018

== See also ==
- First K. Chandrashekar Rao ministry
- Second K. Chandrashekar Rao ministry
- Bharat Rashtra Samithi

| Preceded by Position Established | Chief Minister of Telangana; 2 June 2014 – 3 December 2023 | Succeeded by Revanth Reddy |
