= Mee Seva =

Mee Seva (lit. 'Your Service') may refer to these government services in India:

- Mee Seva (Andhra Pradesh), in the state of Andhra Pradesh
- Mee Seva (Telangana), government service portal in the state of Telangana
