= Edla Guruva Reddy =

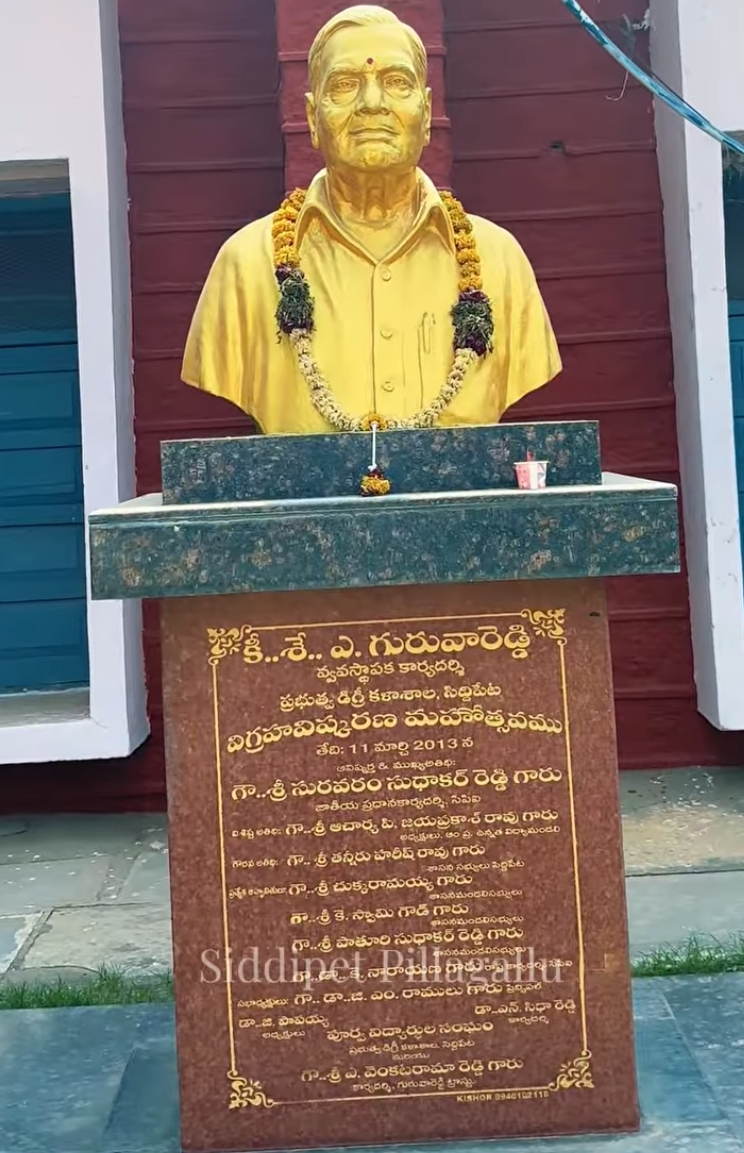
Edla Guruva Reddy Statue at Siddipet Govt Degree College

Edla Guruva Reddy (August 16, 1914 – June 13, 2011) was an Indian activist and politician.

== Biography ==
Reddy was born on August 16, 1914, in Ramancha village, Medak district.

He pursued his education in Siddipet and Hyderabad, completing his Intermediate studies at City College and obtaining his B.A. and M.A. degrees from Osmania University. The "Vandemataram" movement took place while he was at Osmania University, and he actively participated in it. He was expelled from the university and subsequently enrolled at a college in Nagpur.

After the ban was lifted, he returned to Hyderabad and campaigned against the Nizam's autocratic rule and the oppressive Razakars. He participated in the notable Bhairanpally incident in Warangal district. Under his encouragement, 5,000 people performed a flag-salutation ceremony in Vithalapur, Medak district. He played an active role in the liberation movement (Telangana Rebellion) against the autocratic Nizam government and continued his political journey with the Communist Party after Hyderabad's integration into the Indian Union.

He was elected to the Hyderabad State Legislative Assembly in 1952 from Siddipet Assembly Constiuency. Later, in 1958, he was elected to the Legislative Council and served as an MLC for six years.

He died on June 13, 2011.
