= Siddipet Assembly constituency =

Constituency of the Telangana legislative assembly in India

Coordinates: 18.10°N 78.85°E

Siddipet
- Constituency No. 33 for the Telangana Legislative Assembly
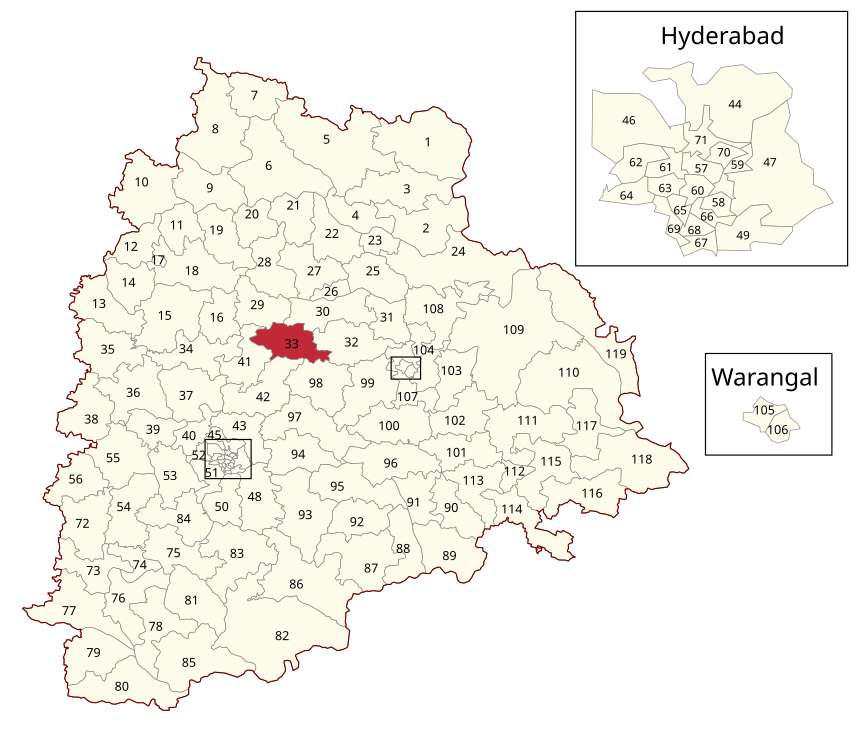
- Location of Siddipet Assembly constituency within Telangana

Constituency details
- Country: India
- Region: South India
- State: Telangana
- District: Siddipet
- Lok Sabha constituency: Medak
- Established: 1951
- Total electors: 2,18,770
- Reservation: None

Member of Legislative Assembly
- 3rd Telangana Legislative Assembly
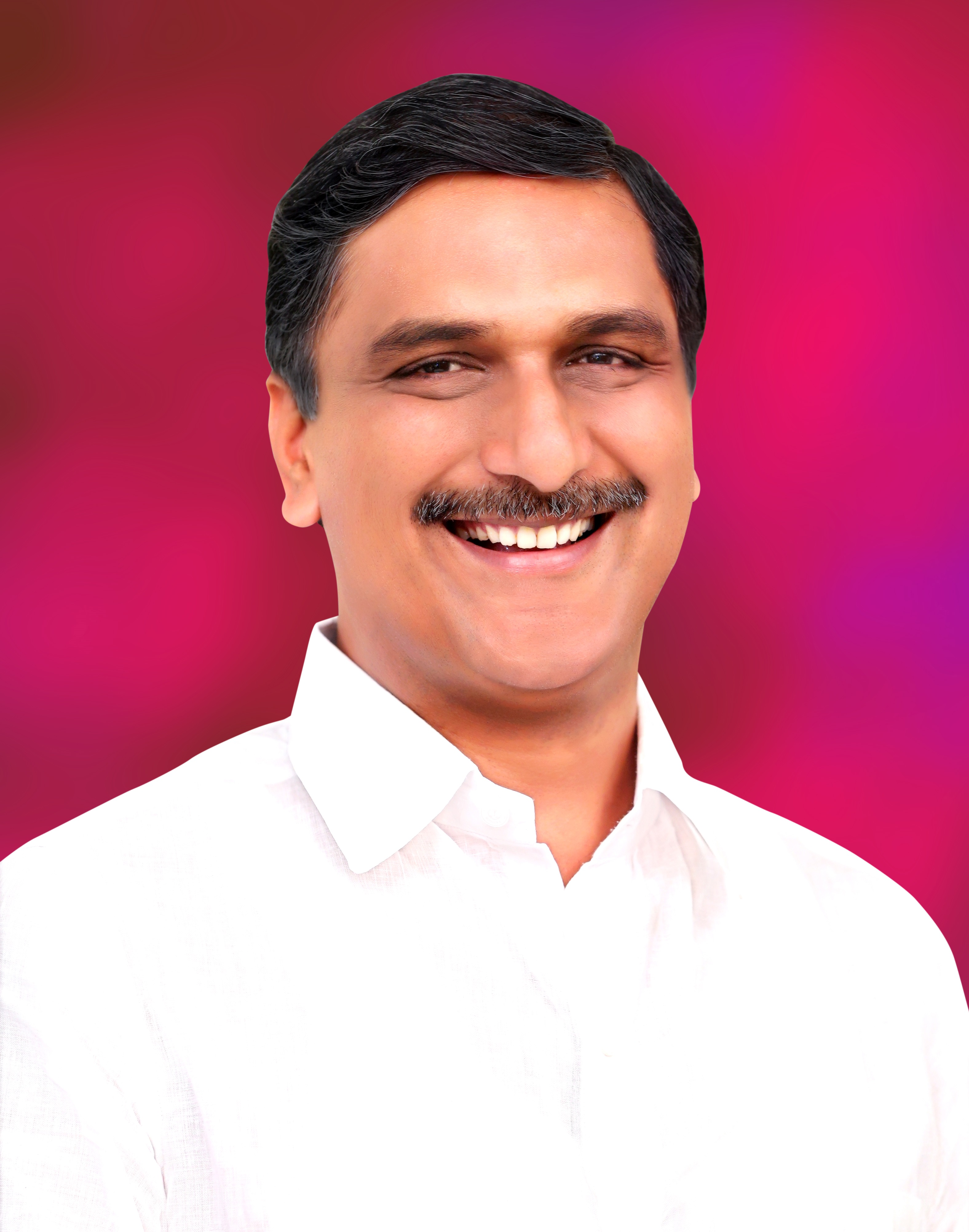
- Incumbent T. Harish Rao
- Party: BRS
- Elected year: 2023

Siddipet Assembly constituency is a constituency of the Telangana Legislative Assembly, India. It is one of the five constituencies in Siddipet district. It is part of Medak Lok Sabha constituency.

K. Chandrashekar Rao, the first Chief Minister of Telangana represented the constituency four times. T. Harish Rao of Bharat Rashtra Samithi is representing the constituency for the fifth consecutive time.

== Mandals ==
The assembly constituency presently comprises the following mandals:

Mandal
Siddipet Urban
Siddipet Rural
Chinna Kodur
Nangunoor
Naryanaraopet

== Members of the Legislative Assembly ==
Members of Legislative State Assembly, who represented Siddipet.

Year	Name	Party
Hyderabad State
1952	Edla Guruva Reddy	People's Democratic Front
Andhra Pradesh
1957	V. Rajeswar Rao	Indian National Congress
1962	Someshwar Rao	Independent
1967	V. B. Raju	Indian National Congress
1970 (Note: By-Election)	A. Madan Mohan	Independent
1972	A. Madan Mohan	Indian National Congress
1978	A. Madan Mohan	Indian National Congress
1983	A. Madan Mohan	Indian National Congress
1985	K. Chandrashekar Rao	Telugu Desam Party
1989	K. Chandrashekar Rao	Telugu Desam Party
1994	K. Chandrashekar Rao	Telugu Desam Party
1999	K. Chandrashekar Rao	Telugu Desam Party
2001	K. Chandrashekar Rao	Telangana Rashtra Samithi
2004	K. Chandrashekar Rao	Telangana Rashtra Samithi
2004	Thanneeru Harish Rao	Telangana Rashtra Samithi
2008	Thanneeru Harish Rao	Telangana Rashtra Samithi
2009	Thanneeru Harish Rao	Telangana Rashtra Samithi
2010	Thanneeru Harish Rao	Telangana Rashtra Samithi
Telangana
2014	Thanneeru Harish Rao	Telangana Rashtra Samithi
2018	Thanneeru Harish Rao	Telangana Rashtra Samithi
2023	Thanneeru Harish Rao	Bharat Rashtra Samithi

== Election results ==
Vote share of Winning candidates
2023	58.17%
2018	78.59%
2014	71.96%
2010 (By-Poll)	82.16%
2009	65.02%
2004 (By-Poll)	55.76%
2004	63.84%
1999	61.02%
1994	60.91%
1989	55.57%
1985	57.39%
1983	40.33%
1978	49.91%
1972	58.15%
1970 (By-Poll)	62.93%
1967	55.37%
1962	52.12%
1957	51.86%
1951	75.89%

=== 2023 ===
Telangana Assembly Elections, 2023: Siddipet
Party	Candidate	Votes	%	±%
BRS	T. Harish Rao	105,514	58.17	▼20.42
INC	Pujala Harikrishna	23,206	12.79	▲2.61
BJP	Dudi Srikanth Reddy	23,201	12.79	▲6.05
BSP	Gadhagoni Chakdradhar Goud	16,610	9.16	New
Independent	Pilli Sai Kumar	4,970	2.74	N/A
NOTA	None of the Above	1,300	0.72	▼1.04
Majority		82,308	45.38	▼25.67
Turnout		1,81,403		
BRS hold		Swing		

=== 2018 ===
2018 Telangana Legislative Assembly election: Siddipet
Party	Candidate	Votes	%	±%
TRS	T. Harish Rao	131,295	78.59	
TJS	Bhavani Marikanti	12,596	7.54	
BJP	Naini Narotham Reddy	11,266	6.74	
NOTA	None of the Above	2,932	1.76	
Majority		1,18,699	71.05	
Turnout		1,67,055	79.77	
TRS hold		Swing		

=== 2014 ===
2014 Telangana Legislative Assembly election: Siddipet
Party	Candidate	Votes	%	±%
TRS	T. Harish Rao	108,699	71.96	
INC	Taduri Srinivas Goud	15,371	10.18	
BJP	Soppadandi Vidyasagar	13,003	8.61	
NOTA	None of the Above	1,664	1.10	
Majority		93,328	61.78	
Turnout		1,51,049	74.63	
TRS hold		Swing		

=== 2010 (By-election) ===
2010 Siddipet Assembly by-election
Party	Candidate	Votes	%	±%
TRS	T. Harish Rao	108,799	82.16	
INC	T. Srinivas Goud	12,921	9.76	
TDP	P. Babu Mohan	5,258	3.97	
Independent	Nishani Krishna	2,906	2.19	
Independent	A. Prakash	2,100	1.59	
Independent	G. Bansilal	458	0.35	
Majority		95,878	72.40	
Turnout				
TRS hold		Swing		

=== 2009 ===
2009 Andhra Pradesh Legislative Assembly election: Siddipet
Party	Candidate	Votes	%	±%
TRS	T. Harish Rao	85,843	65.02	
INC	Anjaiah Byri	21,166	16.03	
PRP	Dr. Narasimha Chari Veggalam	9,895	7.49	
BJP	Soppadandi Vidya Sagar	3,291	2.49	
Independent	3 Independent Candidates	5,386	4.08	
Others	6 Other Party Candidates	6,450	4.89	
Majority		64,677	48.99	
Turnout				
TRS hold		Swing		

=== 2004 (By-election) ===
2004 Siddipet Assembly by-election
Party	Candidate	Votes	%	±%
TRS	T. Harish Rao	64,376	55.76	
TDP	Cheruku Muthyam	39,547	34.25	
Independent	4 Independent Candidates	5,567	4.82	
Others	3 Other Party Candidates	5,970	5.17	
Majority		24,829	21.51	
Turnout				
TRS hold		Swing		

=== 2004 ===
2004 Andhra Pradesh Legislative Assembly election: Siddipet
Party	Candidate	Votes	%	±%
TRS	K. Chandrashekar Rao	74,287	63.84	
TDP	Jilla Srinivas	29,619	25.45	
PPOI	Bandipalli Ramaiah	6,872	5.91	
BSP	Alli Billi Narsinga Rao	3,062	2.63	
Independent	Ramaram Chandra Shekhar Reddy	1,584	1.36	
Independent	Gajabheemkar Bansi Lal	943	0.81	
Majority		44,668	38.39	
Turnout		116,367		
TRS gain from TDP		Swing		

=== 1999 ===
1999 Andhra Pradesh Legislative Assembly election: Siddipet
Party	Candidate	Votes	%	±%
TDP	K. Chandrashekar Rao	69,169	61.02	
INC	Mushinam Swamy Charan	41,614	36.71	
BSP	Lingampally Yadagiri	881	0.78	
ATDP	Vasala Padma Reddy	671	0.59	
NTRTDP(LP)	Bathula Chandram	447	0.39	
AJBP	T. Vishweshwar	307	0.27	
Independent	Annadi Sanjeeva Reddy	266	0.23	
Majority		27,555	24.31	
Turnout		117,377	69.85	
TDP hold		Swing		

=== 1994 ===
1994 Andhra Pradesh Legislative Assembly election: Siddipet
Party	Candidate	Votes	%	±%
TDP	K. Chandrashekar Rao	64,645	60.91	
INC	A. Madan Mohan	37,538	35.37	
BJP	Vanga Ramchandra Reddy	2,348	2.21	
BSP	Lagisetty Saibaba	1,003	0.95	
Independent	Kukatla Chandra Shekhar	349	0.33	
Independent	Akkala Ashok	248	0.23	
Majority		27,107	25.54	
Turnout		108,229	74.19	
TDP hold		Swing		

=== 1989 ===
1989 Andhra Pradesh Legislative Assembly election: Siddipet
Party	Candidate	Votes	%	±%
TDP	K. Chandrashekar Rao	53,145	55.57	
INC	A. Madan Mohan	39,329	41.12	
Independent	Annadi Sanjeeva Reddy	2,027	2.12	
AIMIM	Ranga Surender	1,136	1.19	
Majority		13,816	14.45	
Turnout		99,164	69.05	
TDP hold		Swing		

=== 1985 ===
1985 Andhra Pradesh Legislative Assembly election: Siddipet
Party	Candidate	Votes	%	±%
TDP	K. Chandrashekar Rao	45,215	57.39	
INC	T. Mahender Reddy	29,059	36.88	
Independent	6 Independent Candidates	4,510	5.73	
Majority		16,156	20.51	
Turnout		80,013	68.79	
TDP gain from INC		Swing		

=== 1983 ===
1983 Andhra Pradesh Legislative Assembly election: Siddipet
Party	Candidate	Votes	%	±%
INC	A. Madan Mohan	28,766	40.33	
TDP	K. Chandrashekar Rao (Note: TDP was not a recognised political party in the 1983 election. Therefore, its candidates were officially recorded as Independents, although they contested on the party's Cycle symbol with TDP's B Form.)	27,889	39.10	
BJP	Nimma Narsimha Reddy	13,358	18.73	
Independent	Kacham Bala Krishan	1,310	1.84	
Majority		877	1.23	
Turnout		73,189	65.01	
INC gain from INC(I)		Swing		

=== 1978 ===
1978 Andhra Pradesh Legislative Assembly election: Siddipet
Party	Candidate	Votes	%	±%
INC(I)	A. Madan Mohan	32,729	49.91	
INC	Tadsina Mahendar Reddy	11,254	17.16	
Independent	P. V. Rajeshwar Rao	9,615	14.66	
JP	Khwaja Moinuddin Ahmed	8,859	13.51	
Independent	Aireni Mallaiah	3,114	4.75	
Majority		21,475	32.75	
Turnout		67,759	70.83	
INC(I) gain from INC		Swing		

=== 1972 ===
1972 Andhra Pradesh Legislative Assembly election: Siddipet
Party	Candidate	Votes	%	±%
INC	A. Madan Mohan	27,437	58.15	
Independent	Sirikonda Venkat Rao	10,305	21.84	
Independent	Raja Mallaiah	8,914	18.89	
STS	T. Gowri Shankar	529	1.12	
Majority		17,132	36.31	
Turnout		48,646	60.08	
INC gain from Independent		Swing		

=== 1970 (By-election) ===
1970 Siddipet Assembly by-election
Party	Candidate	Votes	%	±%
Independent	A. Madan Mohan	31,633	62.93	
NCJ	P. V. R. Rao	11,563	23.00	
CPI	A. G. Reddy	7,073	14.07	
Majority		20,070	39.93	
Turnout				
Independent gain from INC		Swing		

=== 1967 ===
1967 Andhra Pradesh Legislative Assembly election: Siddipet
Party	Candidate	Votes	%	±%
INC	V. B. Raju	24,238	55.37	
CPI	A. G. Reddi	12,995	29.69	
CPI(M)	C. N. Reddi	3,501	8.00	
ABJS	M. Reddi	3,037	6.94	
Majority		11,243	25.68	
Turnout		45,896	66.65	
INC gain from Independent		Swing		

=== 1962 ===
1962 Andhra Pradesh Legislative Assembly election: Siddipet
Party	Candidate	Votes	%	±%
Independent	Someshwar Rao	18,320	52.12	
INC	P. V. Rajeshwar Rao	16,827	47.88	
Majority		1,493	4.24	
Turnout		36,776	60.05	
Independent gain from INC		Swing		

=== 1957 ===
1957 Andhra Pradesh Legislative Assembly election: Siddipet
Party	Candidate	Votes	%	±%
INC	P. V. Rajeswar Rao	16,909	51.86	
PDF	A. Guruva Reddy	13,255	40.66	
Independent	Ramachandra Reddy	2,439	7.48	
Majority		3,654	11.20	
Turnout		32,603	59.03	
INC gain from PDF		Swing		

=== 1951 ===
1952 Hyderabad State Legislative Assembly election: Siddipet
Party	Candidate	Votes	%	±%
PDF	Edla Guruva Reddy	22,077	75.89	
INC	P. V. Rajeshwara Rao	7,015	24.11	
Majority		15,062	51.78	
Turnout		29,092	57.75	
PDF win (new seat)				

== See also ==
- Siddipet
- List of constituencies of Telangana Legislative Assembly
