= Bakri Chepyal =

- Village
- Location in Telangana, India
- Coordinates: 18°3′32″N 78°52′39″E
- Country: India
- State: Telangana
- District: Siddipet

Population (2001)
  - Total: 2,000

Languages
  - Official: Telugu
- Time zone: UTC+5:30 (IST)
- PIN: 502277
- Telephone code: [91] 8457
- Vehicle registration: AP23
- Nearest city: Siddipet
- Lok Sabha constituency: Siddipet
- Vidhan Sabha constituency: Siddipet

Bakri Chepyal, is a gram panchayat (village) under Siddipet mandal, Siddipet district, Telangana, India. As of the 2001 census, the population was around 2000.
