= Siddipet Police Commissionerate =

- Common name: Siddipet City Police
- Abbreviation: SPC

Agency overview
- Formed: 11 October 2016
- Employees: Commissioner of Police; Deputy commissioner Additional Deputy Commissioners; Police Inspectors; Assistant Police Inspectors; Sub Inspectors

Jurisdictional structure
- Operations jurisdiction: Siddipet district, India
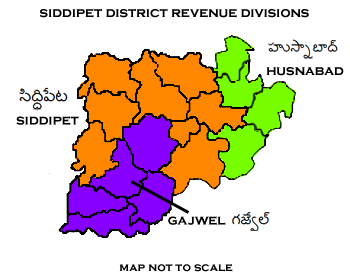
- Map of Siddipet Police Commissionerate's jurisdiction
- Governing body: Government of Telangana
- General nature: Local civilian police

Operational structure
- Headquarters: Siddipet, Telangana, India
- Agency executive: Dr.B.Anuradha IPS, Commissioner of Police
- Parent agency: Telangana Police

Website
- https://siddipetpolice.telangana.gov.in/

Siddipet Police Commissionerate is a city police force with primary responsibilities in law enforcement and investigation within Siddipet, Telangana.

The Commissionerate was officially inaugurated along with the new 21 districts and with 4 other new commissionerates in the state on 11 October 2016. on the eve of Dasara.

== Jurisdiction ==
Siddipet Commissionerate consists of 3 Divisions i.e. Siddipet, Gajwel and Husnabad.

There are 6 Circles viz.

- Siddipet Rural
- Dubbaka
- Gajwel Rural
- Thoguta
- Husnabad
- Cherial

There are 26 Law and Order Police Stations under this commissionerate.

== Latest ==
On 20 June 2021 the Chief Minister of the state K.Chandra shekar Rao had inaugurated the Newly constructed Commissionerate-cum-District Police Headquarters along with the newly built Integrated Collectorate complex. It was built in 19 acres of land with Rs.19 Crores.
