= Capu =

Capu or CAPU may refer to:

- Capu River, Romania
- Capilano University, North Vancouver, Canada
- Central de Autobuses Puebla, Puebla, Mexico

== See also ==
- Kapu (disambiguation)
