= Imambad =

Imambad ఇమాంబాద్
- Neighbourhood / Outgrowth (OG)
- Location in Telangana, India
- Coordinates: 18°08′19″N 78°50′44″E
- Country: India
- State: Telangana
- District: Siddipet
- Mandal: Siddipet Urban
- Elevation: 490 m (1,610 ft)
- Time zone: UTC+5:30 (IST)
- PIN: 502276
- Telephone code: +91-8457
- Vehicle registration: TS-36

Imambad (इमामबाड़ा) is a neighbourhood of Siddipet in the Medak district of the Indian state of Telangana.
