= Kapu =

Kapu may refer to:

== Places ==
- Kapu, Karnataka, a town in Karnataka, India
  - Kapu Assembly constituency
- Kapu, Arunachal Pradesh, a settlement in Tirap district, Arunachal Pradesh, India
- Kapu, Iran, a village in Iran
- Kapu, Estonia, a village in Estonia

== Other uses ==
- Kapu (Hawaiian culture), a Hawaiian code of conduct
- Kapu (caste), a social group of India
- Kapu or Kapari, a title for fictional tribal chiefs in the 2023 Indian film Salaar
- Kapu Rajaiah, Indian painter
- KAPU-LP, American radio station

== See also ==
- Capu (disambiguation)
