= Aarogya Lakshmi scheme =

- Type of project: Nutritional program for mother and child
- Location: Telangana, India
- Founder: Government of Telangana
- Chief Minister: Kalvakuntla Chandrashekhar Rao
- Ministry: Department of Women Development and Child Welfare
- Established: 1 January 2015
- Budget: ₹850 crores per year
- Status: Active

Aarogya Lakshmi scheme is a nutritional program to support pregnant and lactating women by the Government of Telangana. The scheme is available for women below and above poverty line, over 2.71 lakh pregnant women and 2.03 lakh lactating mothers are being served one full meal at 35,000 Anganwadi centres in the State. It is designed on the lines of the World Health Organization guidelines on nutrition for women and children.

== History ==
The scheme was launched by Chief Minister of Telangana, K. Chandrashekhar Rao on 1 January 2015. The scheme is an improved version of Amrutha Hastham.

== The scheme ==
The nutritional meals are provided at 31,897 anganwadis and 4,076 mini anganwadis in the state. Under the program, a beneficiary gets

- 16 eggs a month for children in the age group of 7 months to 3 years
- An egg every day for children from 3 to 6 years.
- Pregnant and lactating mothers also got an egg every day and 200 ml of milk for 25 days a month.
- A pregnant or lactating woman is provided with one meal every day for 25 days in a month.
