= Double Bedroom Housing scheme =

Government scheme in India

Double Bedroom scheme
- Type of project: 5.72 lakh 2BHK House for the poor
- Location: Telangana, India
- Founder: Government of Telangana
- Chief Minister: Revanth Reddy
- Established: AFDBH021600358083
- Budget: ₹22,000 crores (as of March 2018)
- Status: Active
- Website: Official site

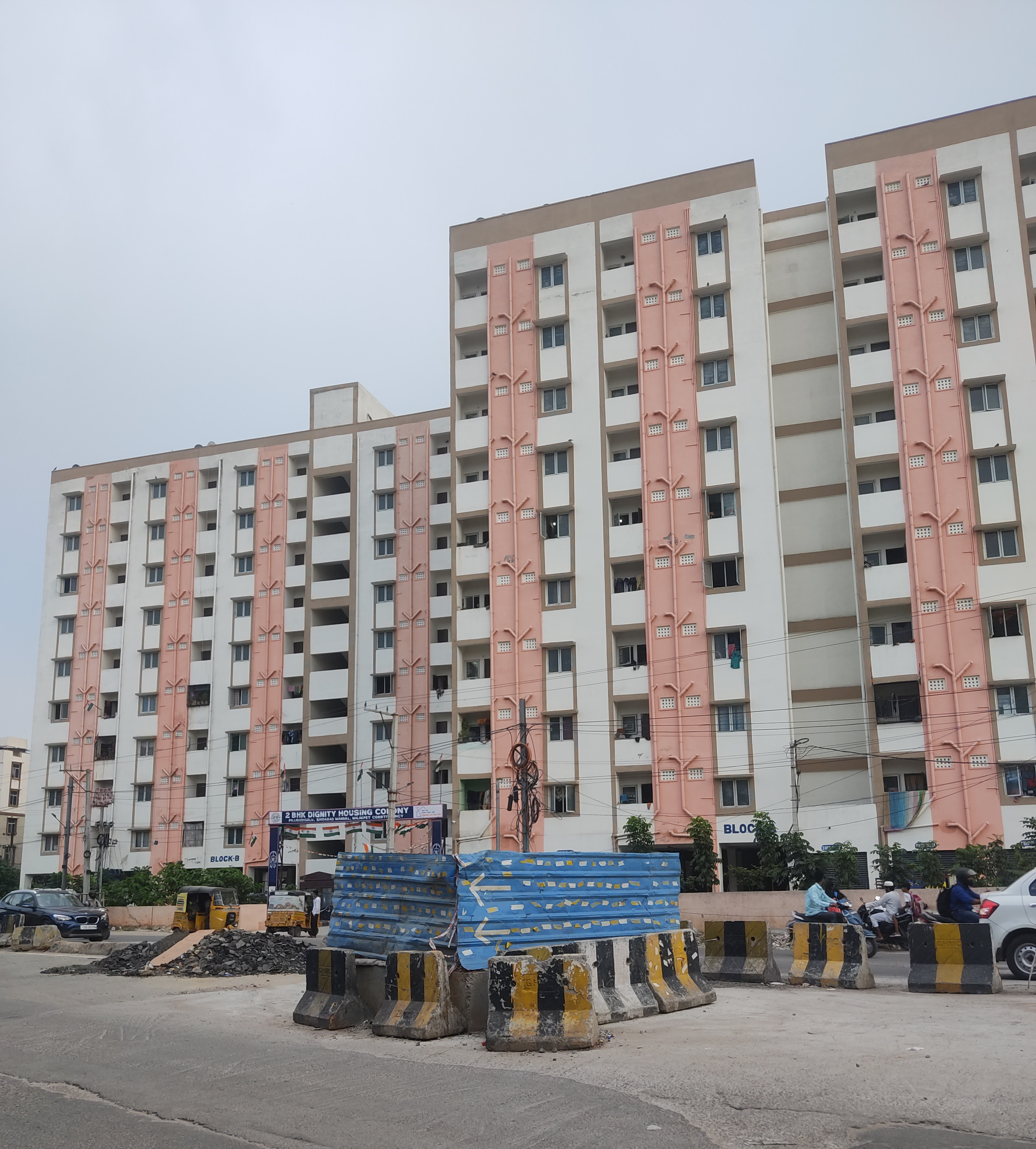
2BHK Dignity Housing Colony, Saidabad

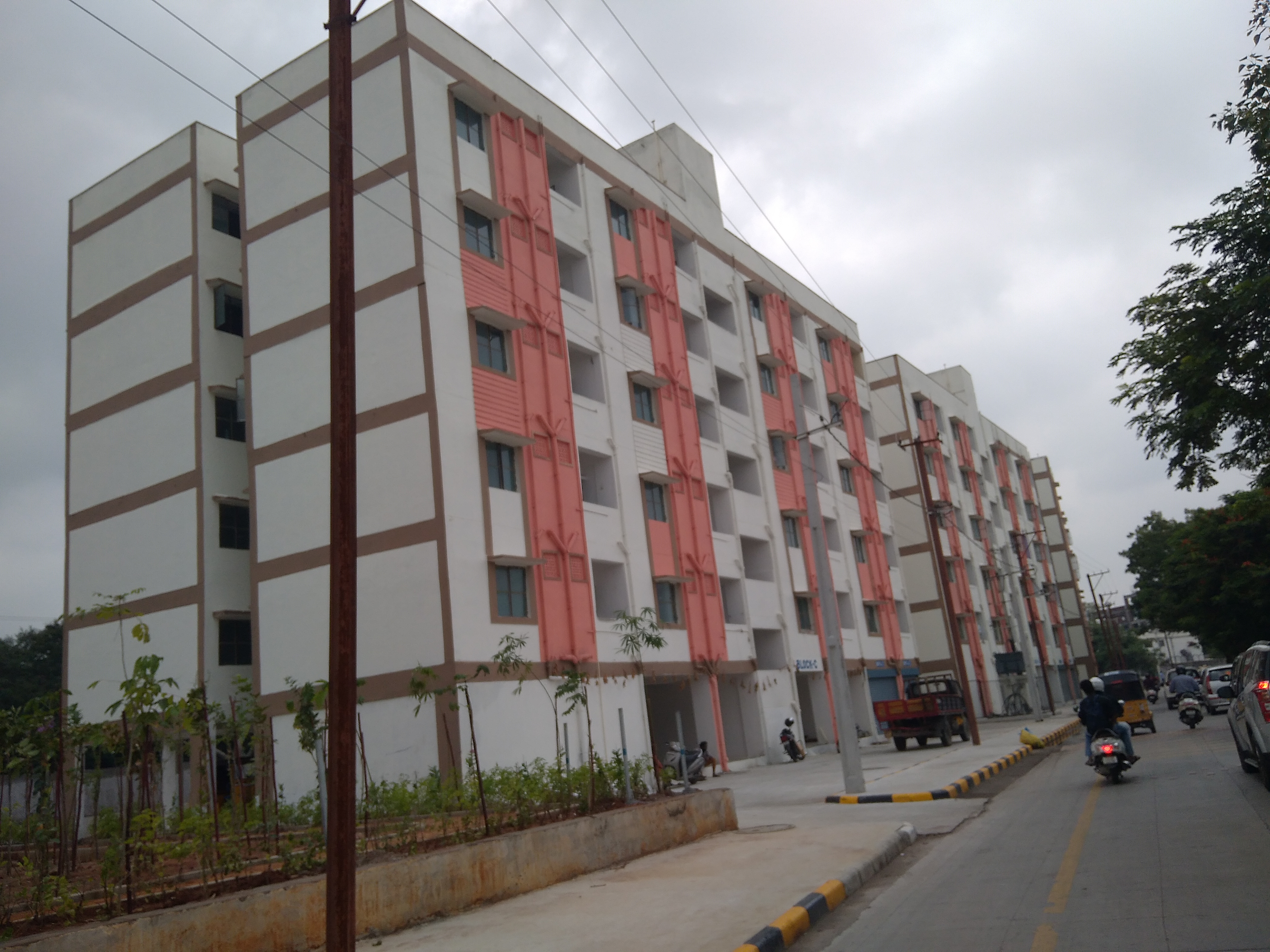
2BHK housing scheme in Telangana state

Double Bedroom Housing scheme or 2BHK scheme is a housing project designed by the Government of Telangana. The scheme aims to make the city of Hyderabad a slum-free city by providing free-of-cost housing to the shelter-less poor in rural and urban areas. The plan aims to provide 2.72 lakh by March 2019, followed by an additional 3 lakh by 2024. Nearly 100,000 houses or high-rise flatlets are set to be completed in the year 2021.

== History ==
The scheme was announced in the election manifesto of Telangana Rashtra Samithi, in May, 2014. 5.72 lakh houses were to be allotted to the poor across the state, including 2 lakh houses in Hyderabad. The pilot project for double bedroom houses was built at Erravalli on 5 March 2016. The villages adopted by the Chief Minister are located in Jagdevpur mandal, Siddipet district.

== Scheme ==
The scheme started pilot projects across the state. Applications are submitted either online at Mee Seva, or its centers. In Hyderabad, the slums to be cleared have been identified and residents are relocated for the construction. In some areas, government-owned land is identified and houses are built there.

After the construction is completed, the house is transferred and registration is done in the beneficiary's name by the government. The house cannot be sold, but can only be passed as inheritance to the next generation of the family.

== 2 BHK house ==
2 BHK houses built in rural areas are on a 200 square yard plot. The structure comprises 560 square feet. They have two bedrooms, a kitchen, hall and two bathrooms. In urban areas, projects are Ground +3 floor apartments. In GHMC areas, Ground +9 floor apartments are constructed.

=== Tunnel form technology ===
To expedite the construction of 6,240 2 BHK houses at Rampally and 15,660 houses at Kollur, the Greater Hyderabad Municipal Corporation applied advanced tunnel form technology for the first time.

== Cost escalation ==
The cost was estimated in the manifesto in 2014 to be ₹3.5 lakhs per house, but escalated to ₹7.5 lakhs by 2017 due to design upgrades and increases in material costs. An additional ₹1.25 lakhs per house goes for amenities, roads etc.

The government struck a deal with cement companies for a below market rate as a social responsibility, and paid the bills online. Steel prices increased three times over two years. Free sand for concrete is supplied by the government.

== Status ==
By March 2018, of the 2.72 lakh targeted houses, 9500 were completed, and 169,000 houses are in advanced stages of completion at a capital outlay of over ₹18,000 crores.

== Award ==
- HUDCO Design Award – 2017
