= Ananthula Madan Mohan =

Indian politician (d. 2004)

Ananthula Madan Mohan Rao

Member of Legislative Assembly

Minister for Revenue

Minister for Health

Personal details
- Born: 1931 or 1932 Andhra Pradesh, India (now Telangana, India)
- Died: 01, November 2004 Andhra Pradesh, India (now Telangana, India)
- Party: Indian National Congress
- Education: Nizam College, Osmania University, Hyderabad

Ananthula Madan Mohan (1931 or 1932 – 2004) was a former politician from undivided Andhra Pradesh who was a four-time Member of Legislative Assembly and three-time Minister in Andhra Pradesh holding various portfolios. He was the Leader of Opposition when N. T. Rama Rao of Telugu Desam Party won a landslide victory in the 1983 Assembly election.

He represented Siddipet Assembly in Medak district, present-day Telangana state, and was first elected to the Assembly as an Independent from Siddipet in the 1970 by-poll. He later joined the Indian National Congress and won the 1972, 1978, and 1983 elections on a Congress ticket.

== Early life and education ==
Madan Mohan was born in 1931. He graduated from Nizam College in 1954 and later graduated in law from Osmania University in Hyderabad and became a practising advocate in Jangaon, Warangal and High Court in Hyderabad.

He was the Guru of Telangana's former CM KCR in earlier days. In his earlier political career KCR was a close follower of Madan Mohan. Later KCR defeated Madan Mohan with a landslide majority in the 1989 assembly elections. People from Kondapaka and Siddipet say that this close association of KCR helped him topple his political guru.

== Telangana Agitation ==
During the 60's, while practising as an advocate, Madan Mohan was actively involved in the Telangana movement. He along with others would later float a political party called Telangana Praja Samithi and was the founding president.

== Political career ==
Madan Mohan contested the Siddipet assembly seat in the 1970 by-poll and won. Later he joined Congress and won from Siddipet in the 1972, 1978 and 1983 elections. During this period starting from 1972 he served as a Minister in the Cabinets of P.V. Narasimha Rao, Marri Chenna Reddy, Bhavanam Venkatarami Reddy, Tanguturi Anjaiah and Kotla Vijaya Bhaskara Reddy. He held various portfolios like Revenue, Health, Mines and Geology, Law, Commercial Taxes and Technical Education in his 10-year career. He was instrumental in starting the JNTU, Hyderabad when serving as Minister of Technical Education. Post 1983 elections, when Telugu Desam Party won a landslide victory under N. T. Rama Rao, Madan Mohan served as the leader of the Opposition.
