= Aasara pension =

Welfare scheme in Telangana, India

- Type of project: pension
- Location: Telangana, India
- Founder: Government of Telangana
- Chief Minister: Kalvakuntla Chandrashekhar Rao
- Established: 8 November 2014
- Status: Active

Aasara pension is a pension plan by the Government of Telangana. It is a welfare system of pensions to old people, widows, members of the Goud caste, elephantiasis patients, people with AIDS, physically disabled people and beedi (cigarette) workers. By March 2018, the number of beneficiaries was 4.2 million.

== History ==
The pension scheme was started on 8 November 2014 by the Chief Minister of Telangana, Kalvakuntla Chandrashekhar Rao, in Kothur in Mahboobnagar district. The government spends ₹5,500 crore (₹55 billion) per year on the plan.
