= Kalyana Lakshmi - Shaadi Mubarak =

Government scheme for the poor in Telangana, India

- Type of project: ₹1,00,116 for a girl’s wedding
- Location: Telangana, India
- Founder: Government of Telangana
- Chief Minister: Kalvakuntla Chandrashekhar Rao
- Established: 2 October 2014
- Budget: ₹1450 crores per year
- Status: Active

Kalyana Lakshmi Scheme or Shaadi Mubarak is a welfare scheme for providing financial assistance for marriages by the Government of Telangana, a novel scheme for all poor people in the state. The scheme gives an assistance of ₹1,00,116, and is aimed at preventing child marriages and support marriage expense for financially distressed families. By March 2018, the beneficiaries stood at 3,90,000.

== History ==
The scheme was launched by the Government of Telangana on 2 October 2014 by Kalvakuntla Chandrashekar Rao, the Chief Minister of Telangana, providing Rs51,000 to families from scheduled castes and tribes and later to all poor families in the state.

== The scheme ==
The financial assistance was increased to ₹1,00,116 on 19 March 2018 from ₹75,116. It is provided to the bride's family at the time of marriage to meet the marriage expenses. The budget allocated, ₹1450 crores, for the year 2018–19. Under Kalyana Lakshmi Scheme the budget allocated ₹1350 crores for the year 2020-21.

== Eligibility ==
A Telangana resident girl, over 18 years of age, belonging to any community with a combined annual income of her parents not exceeding ₹2 lakh is eligible for the Scheme. The unmarried girl from the SC/ST/BC/EBC category should be a Telangana resident, and their age should be above 18 at the time of their marriage.
