= Kudimaramathu Scheme =

Irrigation project in Tamil Nadu, India

Kudimaramathu Scheme (குடிமராமத்து திட்டம்)
- Type of project: Restoration of 16,098 Tanks and Lakes
- Location: Tamil Nadu, India
- Founder: Government of Tamil Nadu
- Chief Minister: Edappadi K. Palaniswami
- Ministry: Water Resources Department, Tamil Nadu
- Established: 13 March 2017
- Status: Active
- Website: Official website

Kudimaramathu is a scheme for restoring all the minor irrigation tanks and lakes in Tamil Nadu State, India. This is the program taken up by the Government of Tamil Nadu led by Chief Minister Edappadi K. Palaniswami on 13 March 2017.

In April 2022, the Government of India launched a similar water body rejuvenation scheme called the Mission Amrit Sarovar.

== History ==
In Tamil, Kudi means 'farmers or people'. Maramathu means 'repair'. It literally means the maintenance and management of waterbodies by people. It has existed in India even after the British rule. During the summers, as one of the agriculturalists, they worked to deepen and widen the lakes, streams, ponds, canals and drains which are the sources of agricultural irrigation and drinking water. They also repair damaged sluices. This work of citizens is called 'Kudi maramathu' (civic work). After the lakes etc. After Water resources like lakes, ponds were taken over by the Tamil Nadu Public Works Department in independent India, such works were abandoned. It was briefly revived in Erstwhile United Thanjavur district in 1975.

== Kudimaramathu Works ==
During kudimaramathu work, The inner surface of the lake will be dredged from twice as far as the height of the bank. That is, if the height of the bank is 10 meters, they will move 20 meters in the inner part of the lake. This is done to prevent the weakening of the bottom of the bank and breakage of the lake bank. This is called Sediment basin. The soil from the lake taken in this way is first poured into the ditches of the lake during the rainy season and leveled and the banks are strengthened with the remaining soil. The remaining silt for these works will be distributed to the farmers. The soil is also used for pottery, construction and other needs. The bushes, thorn plants, garbage washed in during the rainy season in the lake will be disposed. Encroachments will be removed. Blockages in sluices and culverts will be removed. These are the basic functions of Kudi Maramathu.

== Benefits ==
As works are carried out every year, additional rain water is stored in the water bodies and the ground water level rises. Nutrient rich Alluvial soil excavated for plowing is applied to the agricultural fields as manure.

== Post Independence ==
After the independence of India, the kudimaramathu works are carried out by the Irrigation Department, which functions under the Public Works Department of the State Governments.

=== Tamil Nadu State Government Scheme ===
In 2017, the Tamil Nadu government implemented the Kudimaramathu scheme to rejuvenate water bodies with the participation of agriculturalists reviving the age old practice of community participation in maintenance and management of tank irrigation systems. The Government sanctioned this special scheme of Rs.100/- Crore for the year 2016-17 and Rs.300/- Crore for the year 2017-18 to mitigate the impact of floods, increase the water table and reduce drought, and restore all water bodies in Tamil Nadu with the participation of farmers.

== See also ==
- Mission Kakatiya, Telangana
- Tank-cascade system, Sri Lanka
