= Nanganur =

NANGNOOR
- village
- Country: India
- State: Telangana
- District: siddipet

Languages
  - Official: Telugu
- Time zone: UTC+5:30 (IST)
- Vehicle registration: TS 15
- Website: telangana.gov.in

Nanganur is a village in siddipet district of Telangana, India.

== Institutions ==
- Andhra Bank has a branch at Nanganur.
- 2 Govt Junior Colleges in Nangnoor.
- Temples – there are 5 temples in Nangnoor Village:
- Nallapochamma Temple. It is located towards Ankushapur Road, Sunday and Thursday many devotees used to come to the temple.
  - SRI Rama temple
  - Uru Pochamma
  - Hanuman Temple is located at Satyam House
  - Venkateshwer temple.
  - shiva temple
  - panchamuka anjaneya swamy temple bc, colony

== Villages ==
The villages in Nanganur mandal includes: Akkanepalle, Ankushapur, Baddipadaga, Durgapalle, Gatlamalyal, Ghanpur, Katha, Khanapur, Konaipalle, Kondamrajpalle, Meqdumpur, Mundrai, Nagrajpalle, Nanganur, Narmetta, Oblapur, Palamakula, Rajgopalpet, Rampur, Siddannapet, Thimmaipalle, Velkatur, Venkatapur, etc..
