= Central de Autobuses Puebla =

Coordinates: 19°4′30″N 98°12′20″W

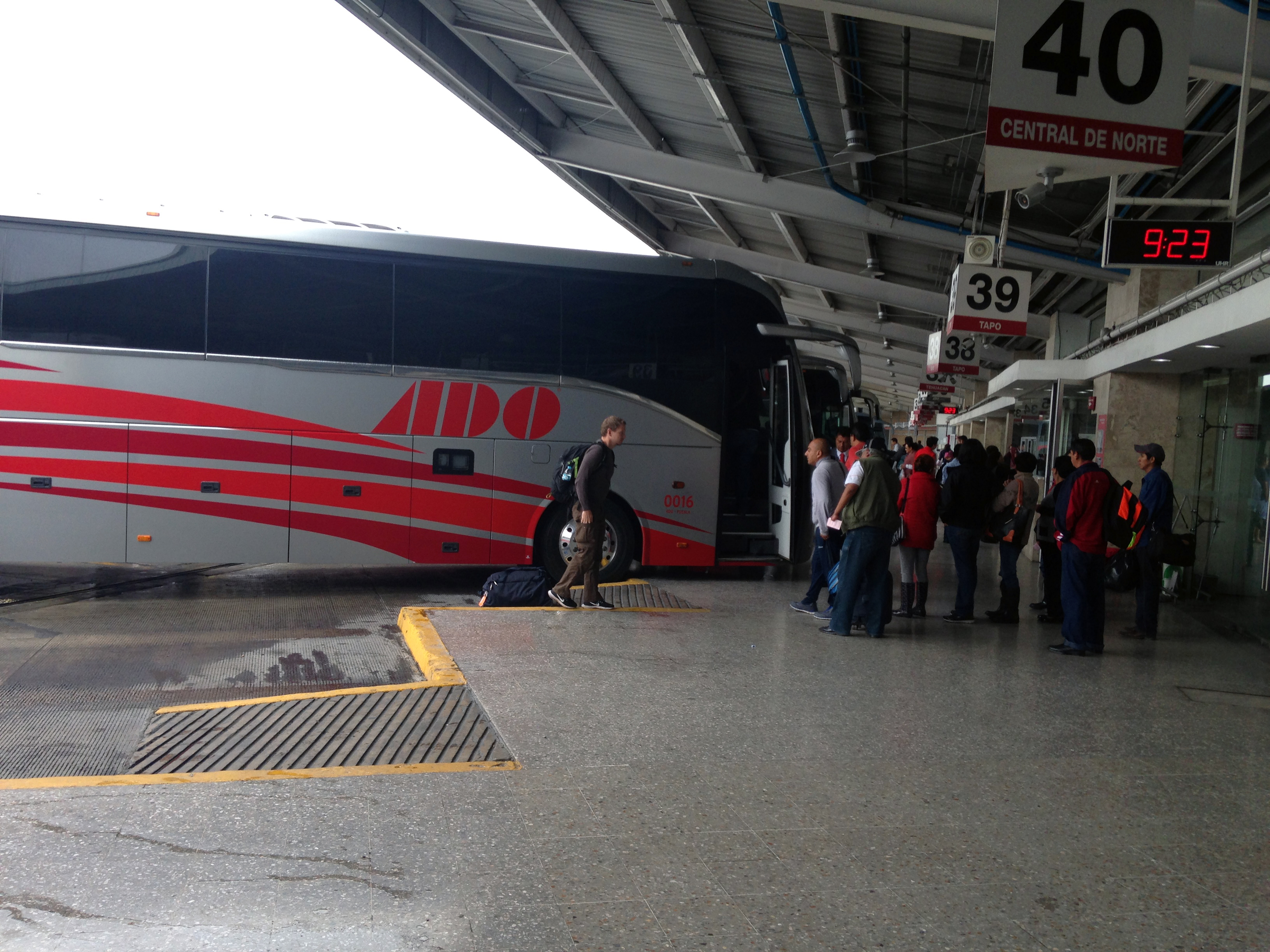
People boarding an ADO line bus parked at CAPU

The Central de Autobuses Puebla (CAPU) is the major bus depot in Puebla and provides access to the vast majority of Mexico through a wide range of coach companies. Due to Puebla's proximity to Mexico City there are numerous routes running from CAPU to two of the capital's major bus depots: Central de Autobuses del Norte and Central de Autobuses del Sur.

Outside the main doors to CAPU is a stop for the numerous local bus routes that can take passengers all around the city as well as fleets of taxis. For passengers arriving at CAPU late at night, it is advisable to pre-purchase a taxi journey using one of the authorised taxi booths.
