= Mission Kakatiya =

Irrigation project in Telangana, India

Mission Kakatiya (మన ఊరు మన చెరువు)
- Type of project: Restoration of 46,000 Tanks and Lakes
- Location: Telangana, India
- Founder: Government of Telangana
- Chief Minister: K. Chandrashekhar Rao
- Ministry: Ministry of Irrigation
- Established: 12 March 2015
- Status: Active
- Website: Official website

Mission Kakatiya ("Our Village Our Lake") is a scheme for restoring all the minor irrigation tanks and lakes in Telangana State, India. This scheme aims to renovate 46,531 tanks and lakes, storing 265 TMC water across the state in five years. This is the first program to be taken up by the Government of Telangana after coming into power in June 2014.

The tanks and lakes are dug to remove silt for increasing water storage capacity. The household agricultural income has also increased by 78.50% in the tank ayacut area.

In April 2022, the Government of India launched a similar water body rejuvenation scheme called the Mission Amrit Sarovar.

== History ==
The agriculture was solely depended on the tanks. Until the Nizam rule, the tanks had a capacity of 244 TMC in Telangana region, but due to negligence most of it was lost. The irrigated land (ayacut) under 70,000 tanks in 1956 was around 25 lakh acres. By 2014 the tanks left were 46,531, nearly half of them were dry. The farmers started depending on water wells for agriculture. When the water table depleted the wells dried up, farmers started digging borewells, which also dried up for lack of Land and Groundwater.

== The project ==
The project was taken up in five phases:

- Phase one - 8003 tanks
- Phase two - 8927 tanks
- Phase three - 5886 tanks
- Phase four - 6000 tanks
- Phase five - Remainder and New tanks creation

Big tanks and lakes, with higher ayacut, were taken up first. It started on 12 March 2015 and ended By March 2018. 27,713 lakes work was completed, spending ₹8700 crores, stabilizing and providing water for 20 lakh acres.

== Usage of silt ==
The usage of silt or soil that is rich in soil nutrients was transferred by the farmers to their fields. Nearly 7 Crore tractor silt dug up from the tanks was used by the farmers.

The crop yield proved to be a boon, as published by pioneering, patented work of a Telangana farmer, Chintala Venkat Reddy. The yield for cotton had gone up by 11.6%, maize by 6.7% and paddy by 4.4%. And the fisherman’s income went up by 30-35%.

== Success ==
By using surface water instead of Tube borewell water there was a marked change in quality. Over 2.88 lakh acres of new ayacut was stabilised and will reach 12 lakh acres by the completion of the project. The ground water table increased from 6.9% to 9.2%. The livelihood of fisherman community was also restored.

The water activist, popularly known as Waterman of India, Rajendra Singh, toured the rejuvenated lakes and was impressed by the turnaround of life. He celebrated his birthday in 2016 on a lake bund in Warangal.

== Geospatial database ==
The geotagging and geospatial database is maintained for 45,800 tanks, for analysis and monitoring. Every tank is assigned a unique GEOID, based on its latitude and longitude. This helps the engineers to plan and monitor effectively with an exhaustive, granular and realtime data, obviating the need for manual recording. The sanitization of the tank database is done by Command Area Development Authority (CADA). This is helping the Department to estimate the area of irrigated land, crops under a given tank, for each season using satellite imagery like Google Earth.

== Biodiversity ==
The project has resulted in return of many migratory birds because of water levels and fishes in the tanks.

== Studies ==
The project is being studied by different government agencies, and also two US based universities, University of Michigan and University of Chicago.

=== University of Michigan ===
University of Michigan study group are developing a low-cost way to increase crop yield and reduce the use of fertilizers for Indian farmers. A multi-disciplinary team of 16 students, from eight schools of the university, after having analyses the work in two villages of Adilabad and Karimnagar districts for 12 months to learn about the program’s effectiveness. Their findings include reduction of fertilizer usage, reduced power utilization, increase in crop yield.

=== University of Chicago ===
University of Chicago’s Tata Development Centre has come forward to do a detailed 2-year study of the program, which will evaluate its impact on agricultural, environmental and economic outcome.

=== NABCON ===
Government of Telangana requested NABARD’s affiliate, NABCONS to do a study. The findings in Impact Assessment Report, was carried out in late 2017 on phase 1 part, found that the ayacut increased over 51% after the project, 17% dried up wells and borewells see water coming back, decrease in utilization of fertilizers, significant increase in groundwater table, and 39% increase in fishing.

=== IRMA ===
Institute of Rural Management Anand also did a study on the effectiveness of the project.

=== Telangana Agriculture University ===
Prof. Jayashankar Telangana State Agricultural University is also doing a study.

== See also ==
Kudimaramathu Scheme, Tamil Nadu
