= T. Harish Rao =

Indian politician

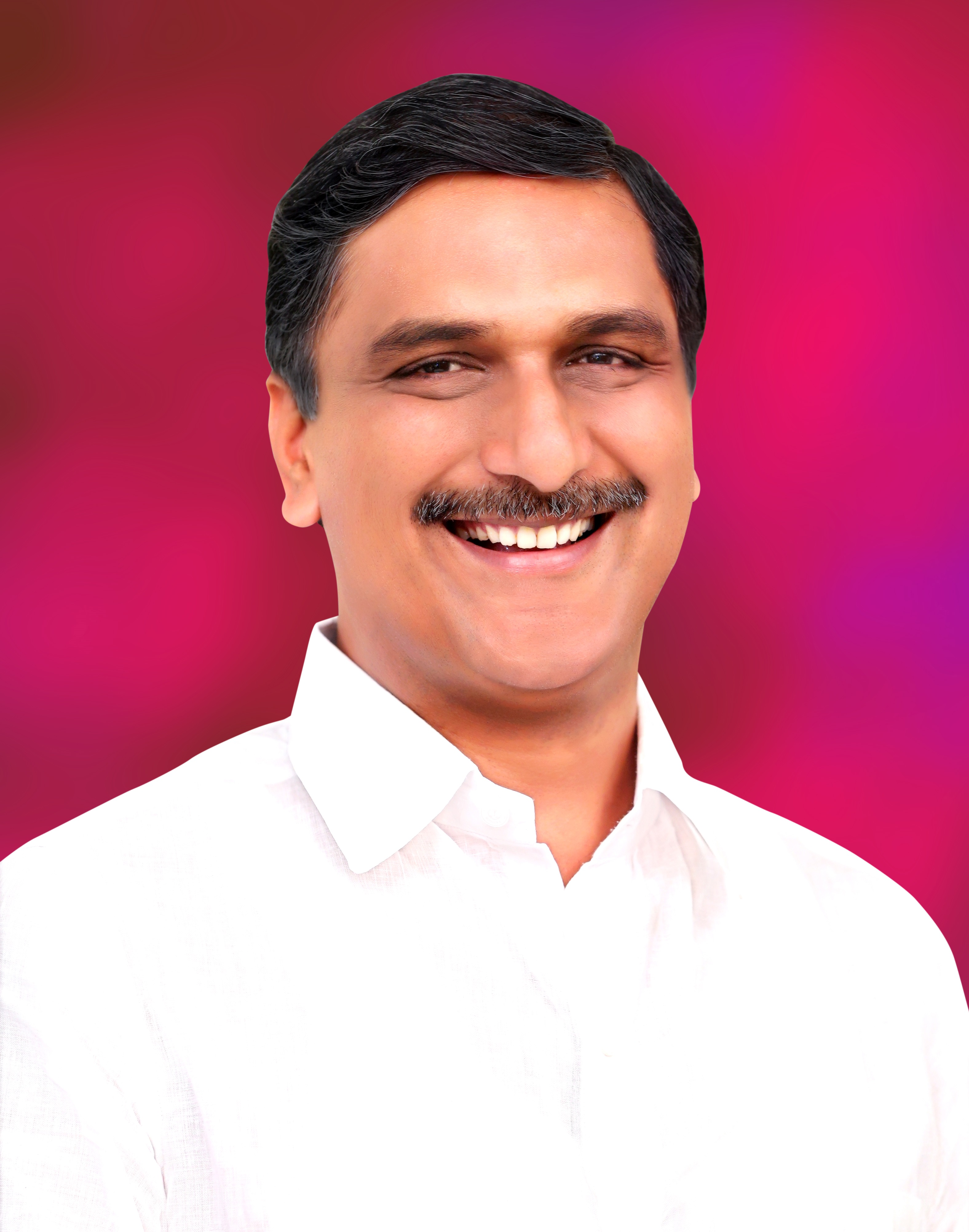

Minister of Finance Health - Medical & Family Welfare Government of Telangana
- In office 8 September 2019 – 3 December 2023
- Governor: Tamilisai Soundararajan
- Chief Minister: K. Chandrasekhar Rao
- Preceded by: Etela Rajender
- Succeeded by: Bhatti Vikramarka

Minister for Irrigation Marketing & Legislative Affairs Government of Telangana
- In office 2014–2018
- Governor: E. S. L. Narasimhan
- Chief Minister: K. Chandrasekhar Rao
- Preceded by: Position established
- Succeeded by: K. Chandrasekhar Rao; Vemula Prashanth Reddy
- Constituency: Siddipet

Member of Legislative Assembly, Telangana
- Incumbent
- Assumed office 2 June 2014
- Preceded by: Telangana Assembly Created
- Constituency: Siddipet

Minister of Youth Services Government of Andhra Pradesh
- In office 2004–2005
- Governor: Surjit Singh Barnala; Sushilkumar Shinde
- Chief Minister: Y.S.Rajasekhara Reddy

Member of Legislative Assembly Andhra Pradesh
- In office 30 July 2010 – 1 June 2014
- Preceded by: Resigned Himself for Telangana Statehood
- Succeeded by: Telangana Assembly Created
- Constituency: Siddipet
- In office 1 June 2009 – 14 February 2010
- Preceded by: Himself
- Succeeded by: Resigned Himself for Telangana Statehood
- Constituency: Siddipet
- In office 31 May 2008 – 8 June 2009
- Preceded by: Resigned Himself for Telangana Statehood
- Succeeded by: Himself
- Constituency: Siddipet
- In office 2004–2008
- Preceded by: K. Chandrashekar Rao
- Succeeded by: Resigned Himself for Telangana Statehood
- Constituency: Siddipet

Personal details
- Born: 3 June 1972 (age 54) Thotapelli village, Bejjanki Mandal, Karimnagar district, Andhra Pradesh (now Siddipet district, Telangana), India
- Party: Bharat Rashtra Samithi
- Spouse: Srinitha Rao
- Education: Kakatiya University

Thanneeru Harish Rao (born 3 June 1972) is an Indian politician and Member of Legislative Assembly (MLA) of Telangana Legislative Assembly. He previously served as the Minister of Medical - Health and Finance Department of Telangana from 8 September 2019 to 2 December 2023. He is the MLA from Siddipet constituency from the Bharat Rashtra Samithi party since 2004.

Between 2014 and 2018, Rao served as Minister for Irrigation, Marketing & Legislative Affairs of Telangana. With his win at the 2018 assembly election, Rao became the youngest six-time member of any legislative assembly in India. He was appointed as the Minister of Finance in the cabinet expansion held on 8 September 2019.

He was also appointed minister for Health, Medical and Family welfare, on 9 November 2021.

== Early life ==
Rao was born in Thotapalli village, Karimnagar District in Velama Community Family, to Satyanarayana Rao and Laxmi Bai. His father was a government employee. He studied at Vaniniketan Paathashala. He completed his diploma from Government polytechnic in Hyderabad. He completed his graduation From Kakatiya University.

== Personal life ==
Harish Rao is married to Srinitha Rao. They have two kids, a son, Archishman and a daughter, Vaishnavi.

== Political career ==
Harish Rao started his political journey with Bharat Rashtra Samithi as youth leader. He was elected to assembly at the age of 32 from Siddipet. He raised his strong voice in assembly on various issues of Telangana region. Soon, he became key member of Bharat Rashtra Samithi and started working as Internal party strategist. He along with other MLA's resigned as Congress party delayed the announcement of bifurcation of Telangana. He won as MLA with majority over 58000 though it was major setback for party winning only 7 MLA seats and 2 MP seats out of 17 MLA's and 4 MP's contested. In 2009, he was once again elected as MLA from Siddipet constituency with over 60000 majority. He was elected as BRS party legislative member. Soon after, he and 10 other members from the TRS resigned from the Legislative Assembly in support of a separate State for Telangana. In July 2010, the High Court of Andhra Pradesh ordered the Election Commission of India to conduct by-polls in Siddipet and other towns across the Telangana region. Harish Rao contested again from Siddipet defeating opponent Babu Mohan (from the Telugu Desam Party) yet again.

Harish Rao was elected as MLA for the sixth consecutive time from Siddipet constituency with a whopping majority of 1,20,650 votes in 2018 Elections.

== Political statistics ==
T. Harish Rao contested as Member of Legislative Assembly from Siddipet.

=== Telangana Legislative Assembly Elections ===
Year	Constituency	Party	Votes	%	Opponent	Opponent Party	Opponent Votes	%	Result	Margin	%
2023	Siddipet	BRS	105,514	58.17	Pujala Harikrishna	INC	23,206	12.76	Won	82,308	45.38
2018	Siddipet	TRS	131,295	78.59	Bhavani Marikanti	TJS	12,596	7.54	Won	118,699	71.05
2014	Siddipet	TRS	108,699	71.96	Taduri Srinivas Goud	INC	15,371	10.18	Won	93,328	61.78

	Year of election	Contested For	Constituency	Political Party	Status	Majority
1	2004 (By Polls)	MLA	Siddipet	Bharat Rashtra Samithi	Won	24,829
2	2008 (By Polls)	MLA	Siddipet	Bharat Rashtra Samithi	Won	58,935
3	2009	MLA	Siddipet	Bharat Rashtra Samithi	Won	64,677
4	2010 (By polls)	MLA	Siddipet	Bharat Rashtra Samithi	Won	95,878
5	2014	MLA	Siddipet	Bharat Rashtra Samithi	Won	93,328
6	2018	MLA	Siddipet	Bharat Rashtra Samithi	Won	1,20,650
7	2023	MLA	Siddipet	Bharat Rashtra Samithi	Won	82,308

== As Irrigation Minister ==
Harish Rao was sworn in as Minister of Irrigation on 2 June 2014. He started Mission Kakatiya program for restoring all the tanks and lakes in Telangana State, India. The program was inaugurated on 12 March 2015 by chief minister Kalvakuntla Chandrashekar Rao. As part of this program, government restored 45,000+ tanks and lakes.

=== Kaleshwaram Project ===
Under Irrigation ministry, TRS government redesigned the project Pranahitha-chevella project on the grounds that the original plan had too many environmental obstacles and had very low water storage provision — only about 16.5 tmc ft. After conducting a highly advanced Light Detection and Ranging (LiDAR) survey for a couple of months, the government separated the original component serving the Adilabad area as the Pranahitha project and renamed the rest as Kaleshwaram by redesigning the head works, storage capacity and the canal system based on the data of availability of water at different locations along the course of the Godavari and its tributaries. The Kaleshwaram project has provision for the storage of about 148 tmc ft with plans of utilising 180 tmc ft by lifting at least 2 tmc ft water every day for 90 flood days. The project is designed to irrigate 7,38,851 hectares (over 18.47 lakh acres) uplands in the erstwhile districts of Karimnagar, Nizamabad, Warangal, Medak, Nalgonda and Ranga Reddy.

== Party troubleshooter ==
Harish Rao has close association with party cadre. Cadre often refer to him as party troubleshooter. He played key role during 2014 elections in all Telangana especially in United Medak district and other districts in Northern Telangana. He also took the complete responsibility of by election, 2014: Medak and Narayankhed by elections, TRS party won with huge majority on both the occasions.

== Controversies ==
During his tenure as the Irrigation Minister of Telangana, Rao has undertaken an irrigation project as Kaleshwaram Lift Irrigation Project, which was touted as the world's largest multi-stage lift irrigation project. The Comptroller and Auditor General (CAG) of India has come out with a damning report on the project in Feb 2024, which says it was economically unviable from the start and details the massive cost overruns, possible undue benefits accrued to contractors for the supply and commissioning of pumps, motors, etc., and the poor planning involved. The project costs have likely exceeded to Rs. 1.47 lakh crores (US$17.698 billion), as against Rs. 81,911 crores (US$9.87 billion) projected to the Central Water Commission (CWC). This report was released within a year after the Medigadda barrage sank. The National Dam Safety Authority (NDSA) found that the Medigadda barrage is severely compromised, rendering it useless unless fully renovated.
