= Kapu Rajaiah =

Indian painter (1925–2012)

KALA RATNA Dr. Kapu Rajaiah
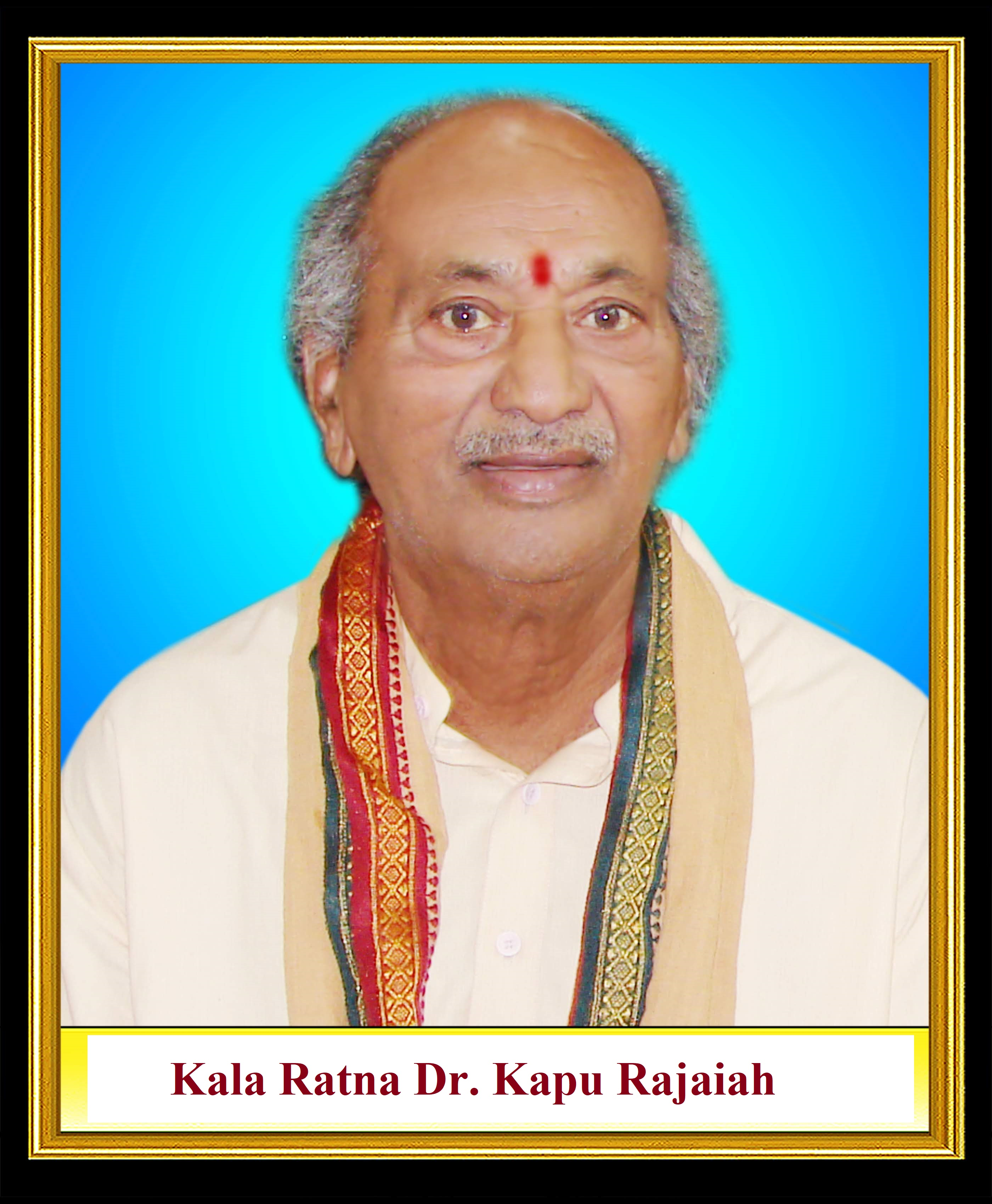
- Born: 7 April 1925; Siddipet, Andhra Pradesh (now Telangana, India)
- Died: 20 August 2012 (aged 87); Siddipet
- Known for: Painting, Indian Folk Artist
- Spouse: Anasuya Kapu
- Website: www.kapurajaiah.org

Kapu Rajaiah (7 April 1925 – 20 August 2012) was an Indian painter. He was well known for his depiction of country life paintings, and his works were displayed around the world. He was the founder of Lalita Kala Samithi in 1963, whose extension was inaugurated at Kala Bhavan.

== Life ==
Rajaiah was born in Siddipet, Medak, into a poor family. He completed a diploma at the Government School of Art in Hyderabad.

His works of Nakashi art had themes such as Vaddera mahila, Yellamma Jogi, Gopika Krishna, Panta Polaalu, Vasantha Keli, Kolatam, Toddy Tappers, Bonalu, and Bathukamma.

Rajaiah died on 20 August 2012, aged 87, from complications of Parkinson's disease.(Telugu)

== Awards ==
- Chitrakalaa Prapoorna in 1975
- Senior Fellowship of Government of India in 1988
- Lalit Kala Akademi
- Kala Praveena in 1993 by JNTU
- Kala Ratna by Bharatamuni Arts Academy, Madanapalli in 1993
- Kala Vibhushana by AIFACS
- Hamsa Award from Government of A.P
- Rajeev Prathibha Puraskar from Government of A.P
- Lalit Kala Ratna in 2007 Lalit Kala Academy.Govt of India.NEW DELHI
