= Kappus =

Kappus is a surname. Notable people with the surname include:

- Franz Xaver Kappus (1883–1966), Austrian military officer, journalist, editor and writer
- Jurij Ambrož Kappus, 18th-century politician in modern-day Slovenia
- Mike Kappus (born 1950), American music manager and record producer
