= Mee Seva (Telangana) =

Government service portal in Telangana, India

- Location: Telangana, India
- Ministry: Minister of Information Technology, Telangana
- Key people: D. Sridhar Babu, IT Minister; Jayesh Ranjan, IT Secretary; T. Ravi Kiran, IFS, Commissioner ESD(Meeseva)
- Launched: 4 November 2011
- Website: Official site

Mee Seva is a government-to-citizen (G2C) and citizen-to-government (C2G) services aggregator provided by the Government of Telangana. It provides access to over 150 government services via service centers or through an app.

The service completed 10 crore transactions in February 2018. Telangana topped digital transactions in India by volume.

The software is developed and supported by Telangana Technology Service (TGTS).

== History ==
Mee Seva was launched in Chittoor district in Andhra Pradesh, India, on 4 November 2011 offering 10 services to the citizens. After formation of Telangana state in June 2014, the services were bifurcated.

== Services ==
The services are offered at over 4,700 franchise centers across 33 districts in the state. The user charges/profits are shared in a 9:1 ratio; 10 per cent profit goes to the government and 90 per cent to the licensed franchisee. It was handling about 1,50,000 transactions a day, as of February 2018.

Pattadar Passbook service to complete Aadhar seeding was also given to Mee Seva service providers on 12 April 2018. Biometrics for Aadhar can be updated using eKYC.

Mee Seva introduced a digital portal in 2023.

== T App Folio ==
An integrated app, as a part of Mee Seva 2.0, that provides services like 180 services in one app, services like Mee Seva services, RTA services, fee payments, bill payment services etc. was launched on 28 February 2018 by the former IT minister of Telangana, K. T. Rama Rao. The T App Folio is similar to Government of India’s, UMANG. The government plans to bring on-board all mobile apps of its various departments to T App Folio by January 2019.

== Awards ==
- WITSA Chairman’s Award at the World Congress IT held in Hyderabad in February 2018.
