= Siddipet =

Siddipet Siddipet
- City
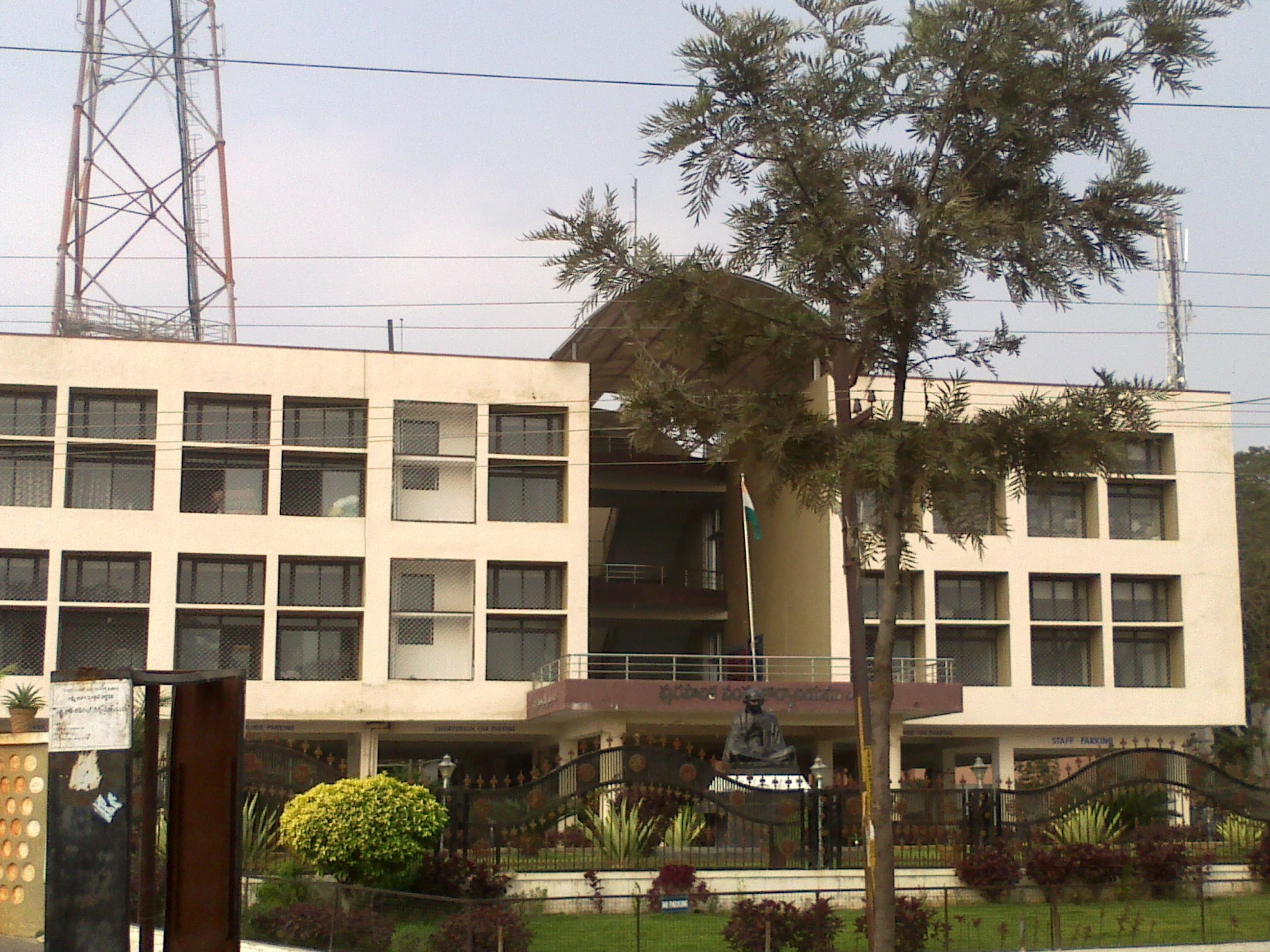
- Municipal corporation of Siddipet

- Location within Telangana Location within India
- Coordinates: 18°06′07″N 78°51′07″E
- Country: India
- State: Telangana
- District: Siddipet
- Named for: Siddis

Government
  - Type: Municipal council
  - Body: Siddipet Municipality
  - Member of Legislative Assembly: T. Harish Rao, BRS
  - Municipal Chairman: Manjula Rajnarsu
  - Commissioner of Police: Dr. B. Anuradha, IPS

Area
  - Total: 42.72 km^{2} (16.49 sq mi)
- Elevation: 506 m (1,660 ft)

Population (2011)
  - Total: 111,358
  - Rank: 13th in Telangana
  - Density: 2,607/km^{2} (6,751/sq mi)

Languages Telugu and Urdu
  - Official: Telugu; Urdu
- Time zone: UTC+5:30 (IST)
- PIN: 502103
- Telephone code: 08457
- Vehicle registration: TG-36
- Literacy: 90.73%
- Website: siddipet.telangana.gov.in

Siddipet, is a city in the Indian state of Telangana. It is a municipality and serves as the headquarters of the Siddipet district. It is located about 100 kilometres (62 mi) north of the state capital, Hyderabad, and 92 kilometres (57 mi) from Warangal. The District Headquarters and Police Commissionerate is located at the Siddipet city.

Siddipet is a regional urban hub and educational centre.

== Demographics ==
Historical population
| Year | Pop. | ±% |
|---|---|---|
| 1931 | 11,260 | — |
| 1941 | 12,865 | +14.3% |
| 1951 | 18,109 | +40.8% |
| 1961 | 18,719 | +3.4% |
| 1971 | 26,296 | +40.5% |
| 1981 | 42,755 | +62.6% |
| 1991 | 54,091 | +26.5% |
| 2001 | 61,809 | +14.3% |
| 2011 | 111,358 | +80.2% |

According to the 2011 Census of India, Siddipet had a population of 111,358, making it one of the larger urban centres in Telangana. The city had an average literacy rate of 90.73%, significantly higher than the national average at the time. Telugu and Urdu are the official languages spoken in the city.

Siddipet has witnessed rapid population growth over the decades, increasing from 61,809 residents in 2001 to 111,358 in 2011, reflecting an increase of over 80% during the decade. The city has consequently emerged as an important regional urban and educational centre in north-central Telangana.

== Governance ==
Siddipet municipality was formed in the year 1952. It is spread over an area of 36.03 km^{2} (13.91 sq mi) with 34 municipal wards. Law enforcement is from Siddipet Police Commissionerate.

=== Politics ===
==== Members of Parliament ====
- 1952–1966: Constituency does not exist

| Lok Sabha | Duration | Name of M.P. | Party affiliation |
|---|---|---|---|
| Fourth | 1967–71 | Gaddam Venkatswamy | Indian National Congress |
| Fifth | 1971–77 | Gaddam Venkatswamy | Telangana Praja Samithi |
| Sixth | 1977–80 | Nandi Yellaiah | Indian National Congress |
| Seventh | 1980–84 | Nandi Yellaiah | Indian National Congress |
| Eighth | 1984–89 | G. Vijaya Rama Rao | Telugu Desam Party |
| Ninth | 1989–91 | Nandi Yellaiah | Indian National Congress |
| Tenth | 1991–96 | Nandi Yellaiah | Indian National Congress |
| Eleventh | 1996–98 | Nandi Yellaiah | Indian National Congress |
| Twelfth | 1998–99 | Malyala Rajaiah | Telugu Desam Party |
| Thirteenth | 1999-04 | Malyala Rajaiah | Telugu Desam Party |
| Fourteenth | 2004-09 | Sarvey Sathyanarayana | Indian National Congress |

- 2008 onwards: Constituency does not exist

Siddipet falls under the Siddipet Assembly constituency and is, in turn, part of Medak (Lok Sabha constituency) of the Telangana Legislative Assembly. Harish Rao is the current Cabinet Minister for Finance, Medical and Health representing the Siddipet Assembly constituency.

== Economy ==
Spread over 3 acres of land, a 4-story IT tower was inaugurated by Telangana IT Minister K.T. Rama Rao and finance minister T. Harish Rao on June 15, 2023. The IT Tower has four floors and has been allocated to 17 companies.

As per IT Ministry the IT tower in siddipet will be expanded and a T-Hub centre will be established soon.

== Education ==
Siddipet has a variety of higher education institutes. Since 2018, it has its own Government Medical College. In 2023, a 1,000 bed government hospital was inaugurated by the medical college.

== Transport ==
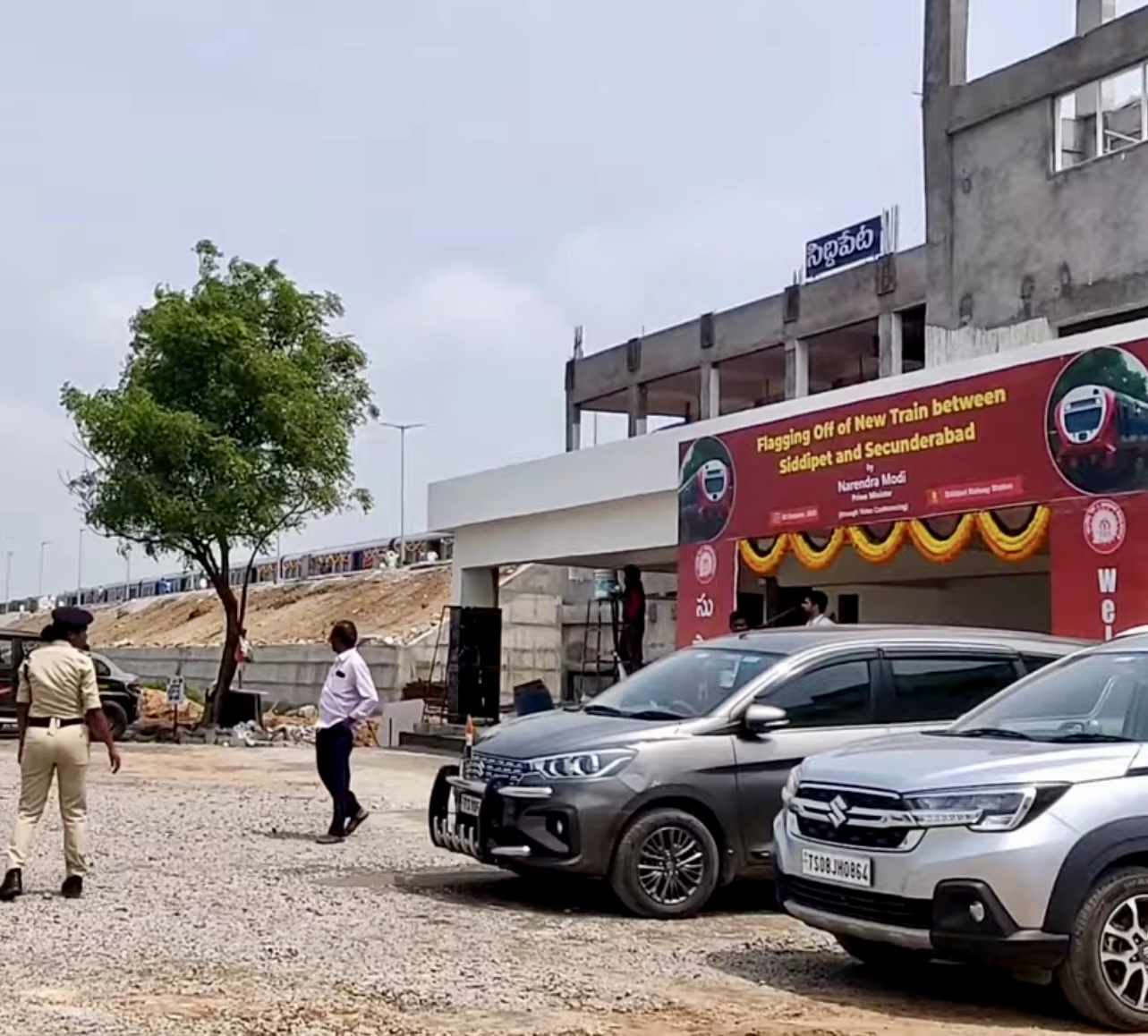
Siddipet railway station

=== Road ===
Siddipet is well connected to nearby villages with State Highway 1. The Telangana State Road Transport Corporation public transport buses to major destinations from Siddipet. A new national highway numbered NH 365B connects Siddipet with different district headquarters of the state Suryapet-Jangaon-Siddipet-Siricilla.

TSRTC operates buses from Siddipet to Karimnagar, Hyderabad, Vemulawada, Tirupati, Mumbai, Shirdi, Godavarikhani, Kaleswaram, Ananthapur, Bangalore, and Srisailam.

==== Airports ====
Rajiv Gandhi International Airport in Hyderabad is the nearest airport at a distance of 147 km by road. The other two nearest airports to Siddipet are Ramagundam Airport and Warangal Airport. The government has plans to develop and run flights to this station under an initiative of the UDAN plan.

==== Railway ====
Siddipet railway station is part of the Manoharabad-Kothapalli rail line.

The Manoharabad - Siddipet portion of the line was inaugurated on 3 October 2023 with a regular Secunderabad-Siddipet DEMU train service.

The full line was completed in 2025. This will connect the city to Hyderabad, Secunderabad, Karimnagar, Peddapalli and Ramagundam etc.

== Notable people ==
- K. Chandrashekar Rao
- T. Harish Rao
- Kapu Rajaiah
- Sampoornesh Babu
- [{Mareddy Ravinder Reddy]}
- [{Enyalapu Harikrishna ]}
