= Chennamaneni =

Chennamaneni is a Telugu surname. Notable people with the surname include:

- Chennamaneni Hanumantha Rao (born 1929), Indian economist
- Chennamaneni Rajeshwara Rao (1923–2016), Indian politician
- Chennamaneni Vidyasagar Rao (born 1941), Indian politician
- Chennamaneni Ramesh (born 1956), Indian politician
