= Kanagarthi =

Kanagarthi may refer to any of the following villages in Telangana, India:

- Kanagarthi, Karimnagar district
- Kanagarthi, Peddapalli district
- Kanagarthi, Rajanna Sircilla district
