= Essential Commodities Act, 1955 =

Act of the Parliament of India

Parliament of India
- Long title: An Act to provide, in the interest of the general public, for the control of the production, supply and distribution of, and trade and commerce, in certain commodities.
- Citation: No. 10 of 1955
- Territorial extent: India
- Enacted by: Parliament of India
- Enacted: 1955
- Assented to: 1 April 1955

Repeals
- Essential Commodities Ordinance, 1955 (1 of 1955)

Amended by
- Essential Commodities (Amendment) Act, 2020
- Status: In force

The Essential Commodities Act, 1955 (ECA) is an act of the Parliament of India that was established to ensure the delivery of certain commodities or products, the supply of which, if obstructed due to hoarding or black marketing, would affect the normal life of the people. This includes foodstuff, drugs, fuel (petroleum products) etc. This act was modified by the Essential Commodities (Amendment) Act, 2020 as part of the 2020 Indian farm reforms.

The ECA was enacted in 1955 and has since been used by the Government to regulate the production, supply, and distribution of a host of commodities declared ‘essential’ to make them available to consumers at a fair price. Additionally, the government can also fix the minimum support price (MSP) of any packaged product that it declares an “essential commodity”.

The list of items under the Act includes drugs, fertilizers, pulses, and edible oils, as well as petroleum and petroleum products. The centre can add new commodities to the list as and when the need arises, and take them off the list once the situation improves.

== Usage ==
If the Centre finds that a certain commodity is in short supply and its price is spiking, it can notify stock-holding limits on it for a specified period. The States act on this notification to specify limits and take steps to ensure that these are adhered to. Anybody trading or dealing in the commodity, be it wholesalers, retailers, or even importers are prevented from stockpiling it beyond a certain quantity.

A State can, however, choose not to impose any restrictions. But once it does, traders have to immediately sell into the market any stocks held beyond the mandated quantity. This improves supplies and brings down prices. As not all shopkeepers and traders comply, State agencies conduct raids to get everyone to toe the line and the errant are punished. The excess stocks are auctioned or sold through fair price shops.

== Background ==
The ECA was enacted in 1955 and has since been used by the Government to regulate the production, supply, and distribution of a whole host of commodities that it declares ‘essential’ to make them available to consumers at fair prices.

On 14 March 2020, the Union Government brought masks and hand-sanitizers under the act to make sure that these products—key for preventing the spread of COVID-19—are available to people at the right price and in the right quality during the COVID-19 pandemic in India. As of 1 July 2020, however, the Government has removed masks and hand-sanitizers from its Essential Commodity List.

== Amendments ==
=== Essential Commodities (Amendment) Act 2020 ===
In May 2020, Finance Minister Nirmala Sitharaman suggested that the Act will be amended and stock limit will be imposed only under exceptional circumstances such as famine or other calamities. There will be no stock limit for processors and supply chain owners based on their capacity and for exporters based on the export demand. It would also end some punitive measures. It will also deregulate agricultural produce such as pulses, onion, potato and cereals, edible oils, and oilseeds, to realize better prices for farmers.

The Essential Commodities (Amendment) Ordinance was promulgated on 5 June 2020. The Lok Sabha passed the ordinance to amend Essential Commodities Act on 15 September 2020, and Rajya Sabha passed it on 22 September 2020. On 27 September 2020, the bill became an act after receiving approval from President Ram Nath Kovind.The Act has been already gazetted .

The ordinance amends the Essential Commodities Act to allow the Government of India to delist certain commodities as essential, allowing the government to regulate their supply and prices only in cases of war, famine, extraordinary price rises, or natural calamities. The commodities that have been deregulated are food items, including cereals, pulses, potatoes, onion, edible oilseeds, and oils. These can only be regulated in the extraordinary circumstances previously mentioned, by imposing limits on the number of stocks of such items that can be held by persons. The Ordinance states that government regulation of stocks will be based on rising prices, and can only be imposed if there is a 100% increase in retail price (in the case of horticultural produce) and a 50% increase in retail price (in the case of non-perishable agricultural food items). These restrictions will not apply to stocks of food held for public distribution in India.

In 2021, the Parliamentary Committee on Food, Consumer Affairs and Public Distribution had submitted a report to the Union Government recommending implementation of the Essential Commodities Act, 2020. The Essential Commodities Act, 2020 was one among the three controversial 2020 Indian agriculture acts that led to the year long 2020–2021 Indian farmers' protest. Bhagwant Mann publicly released his statement that was made during the Committee meeting on 5 June 2020. In his statement, Mann had raised concerns that these farm laws would increase hoarding. Removal of onions and tomato from the list of Essential Commodities, would lead to price rise due to illegal stockpiling to increase the price and then selling at higher prices. This will create hardships for the poor. He also raised the issue of hoarding of potatoes.

Farm unions began the 2020–2021 Indian farmers' protest against three farm acts that were passed by the Parliament of India in September 2020. The acts, often called the Farm Bills, have been described as "anti-farmer laws" by many farmer unions, and politicians from the opposition who say it would leave farmers at the "mercy of corporates".

By mid December, the Supreme Court of India had received a batch of petitions asking for the removal of blockades created by the protesters around Delhi. The Supreme Court of India stayed the implementation of the farm laws in January 2021. Farmer leaders welcomed the stay order, which remains in effect. A Supreme Court appointed committee submitted its confidential report before the court.

Six state governments (Kerala, Punjab, Chhattisgarh, Rajasthan, Delhi and West Bengal) passed resolutions against the farms acts, and three states (Punjab, Chhattisgarh and Rajasthan) have tabled counter legislation in their respective state assemblies. None of the counter legislation passed the respective state governors.

On 19 November 2021, the union government decided to repeal the bills, and both houses of Parliament passed the Farm Laws Repeal Bill, 2021 on 29 November. Following the announcement of the repeal of the farm laws, farmer unions continued with the demand for guaranteed minimum support prices (MSPs), reminding the government of the aim of doubling farmers' income by 2022; and the 2004 MS Swaminathan–headed National Commission on Farmers reports.

== See also ==
- Essential Commodities Act 1955 क्या है?
- 2020 Indian farm reforms
- Essential Services Maintenance Act
