= Minimum support price (India) =

Instrument of agriculture price policy in India

The minimum support price (MSP) is the minimum price for select crops raised in kharif and rabi seasons that the Government of India considers as remunerative for farmers and hence deserves support. This is different from procurement price and issue price. It is generally announced before the sowing/planting season. It is approved by the government and aims to safeguard the farmer to a minimum profit for the harvest while at the same time increasing food security in the country. MSP was initially an incentive for farmers to adopt technology with an aim of increasing the productivity of agricultural land in the 1960s, however in the 2000s it is seen as a market intervention and farmer income scheme. The effectiveness of such a price policy has varied widely between states and commodities. Awareness among farmers of the existence of an MSP is poor at 23%, while awareness of MSP procurement agencies is also poor with only about 20–25% of wheat and paddy produce being sold at MSP.

The Indian government sets the price for about two dozen commodities twice a year. MSP is fixed on the recommendations of the Commission for Agricultural Costs and Prices (CACP), an apex advisory body for pricing policy under the Ministry of Agriculture. CACP in turn recommends the pricing according to a diverse range of factors including national requirements, available resources, farmer wages, cost of living and product competitiveness. However, not all recommendations of CACP are adopted, sometimes, there can be significant difference with the price approved by the government. Food Corporation of India (FCI) and the National Agricultural Co-operative Marketing Federation (NAFED) are involved in implementing the MSP at the state level. While providing a support price to farmers, MSP also supports the public distribution system which provides subsided food.

== History ==
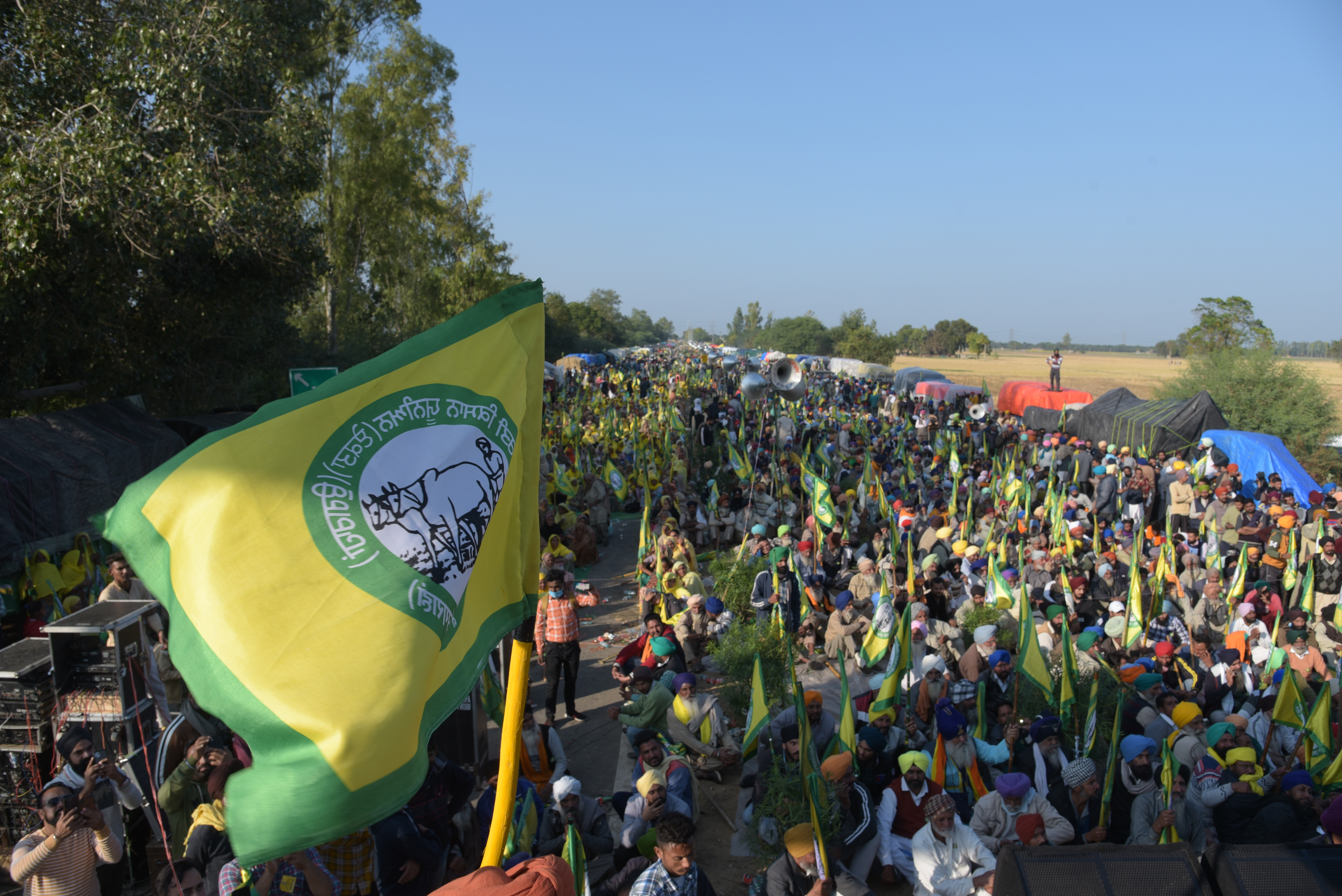
Guaranteed MSP is one of the major demands of the 2020–2021 Indian farmers' protest.

In the 1960s, India saw food shortages such as the Bihar famine of 1966–1967, resulting from droughts and war. During the prime years of the green revolution in India in that decade, a number of agriculture policy strategies were mooted including a government price policy for food grains. One of the main goals was to increase the productivity of agricultural land. High yield varieties, better equipment and fertilizers were among the strategies adopted. Price policy support aimed at increasing land productivity was part of this.

This led to the setting up of the Agricultural Price Commission (APC) in 1965. The Commission introduced a number of price policies including procurement at pre-decided prices, minimum support prices and a distribution system to supply food grains at subsidised rates. This body was reconstituted into the Commission for Agricultural Costs and Prices (CACP) in March 1985 with a new and broader terms of reference. A number of other institutions are involved in the process of implementing the MSP, including central organisation along with their state level bodies. This includes the Food Corporation of India (FCI) and the National Agricultural Co-operative Marketing Federation (NAFED).

These changes resulted in increased production of grains such as wheat and rice resulting in grain shortages to grain surpluses. At the same time the implementation of these price policies was biased and resulted in a decreased focus on diversification, creating shortages in pulses and edible oils. The severity of these adverse impacts vary according to state, region, commodity, and farmer. India is highly skewed in the distribution of its agricultural resources, and accordingly, select regions have benefitted from a MSP.

As per 2013 Ministry of Statistics data only 23% of farmers in the rural agricultural households in India are aware of MSP of crops. Awareness varies from 0 to 50% according to state. Even fewer are aware of a procurement agency buying at MSP. In 2018-19, a quarter of the total paddy sales and only 20% of wheat were sold at MSP. Attempts to ensure MSP is fulfilled have included the decades-old Price Support Scheme (PSS), the 2015 Decentralized Procurement Scheme (DCP), and more recently the 2018 umbrella campaign, the Farmer Income Protection Scheme (PM AASHA). Under AASHA, a price deficiency payment (PDP) system has been launched under which the government will partly compensate farmers for those who have had to sell their crops at market prices less than the MSPs. This could result in large savings for the government as it would not have to procure and store the crops.

== Determinants of MSP ==
While recommending price policy of various commodities under its mandate, the Commission for Agricultural Costs and Prices (CACP) keeps in mind the various Terms of Reference (ToR) given to it in 2009.

To advise on the price policy of paddy/rice, wheat, jowar, [...] and such other commodities as the Government may decide from time to time, with a view to evolving a balanced and integrated price structure in the perspective of the overall needs of the economy and with due regard to the interests of the producer and the consumer.

According to the terms of reference, the Commission has been advised to keep a few points in mind when recommending the price policy. This includes incentivising the farmer for production as per national requirements, allowing for the rational use of resources, the impact on wages, cost of living and product competitiveness. The Commission can also recommend non-price measures and ways to make the price policy implementation effective. However, sometimes there are large variations between what is recommended by the CACP, and what is declared by the government due to selective politics.

There are a number of different ways MSP is calculated and it is not always clear what is intended in policy documents such as 2018 Union budget of India.

== Commodities under MSP ==
Main crops boosted through price policy implementation

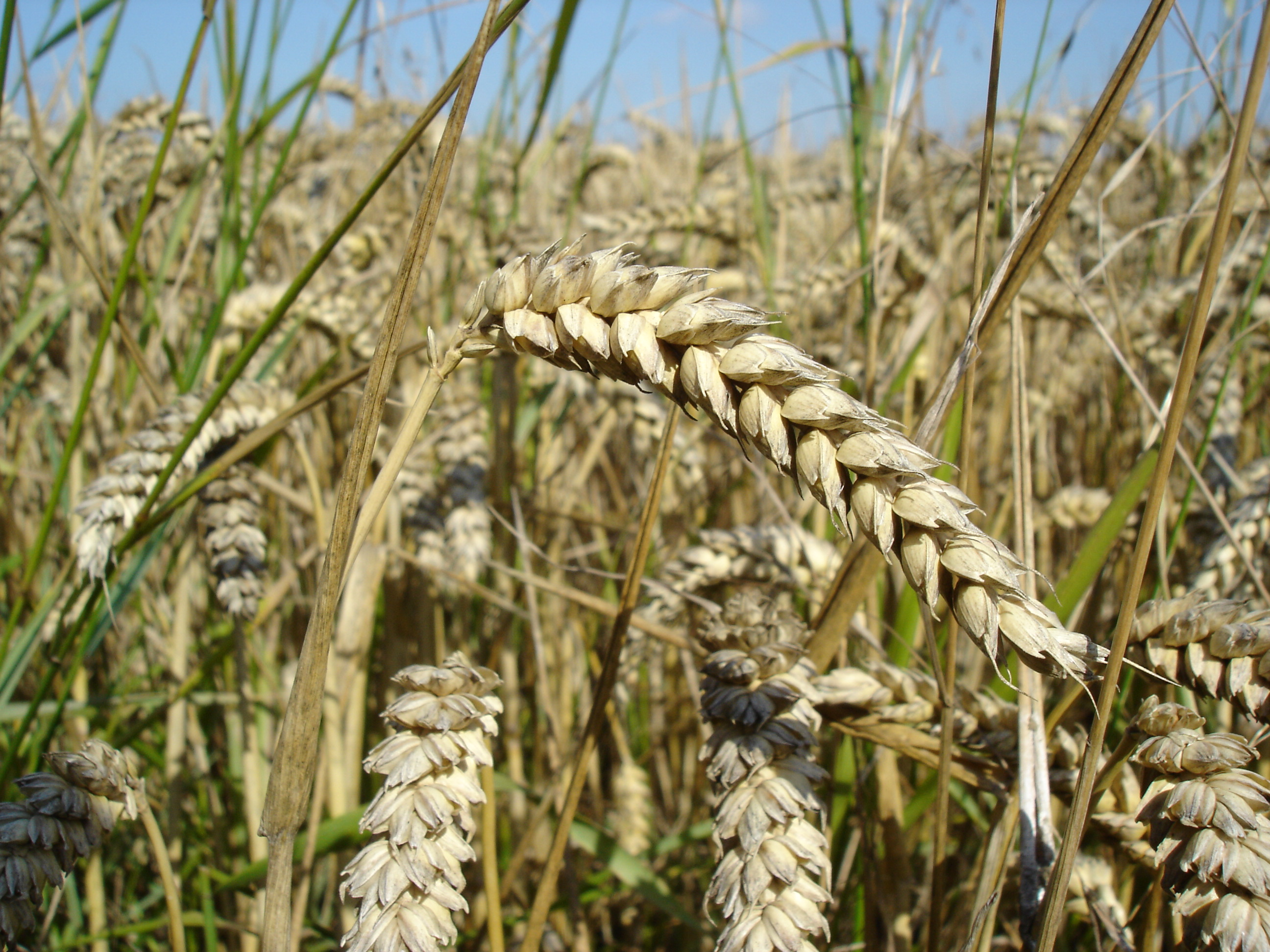
Wheat

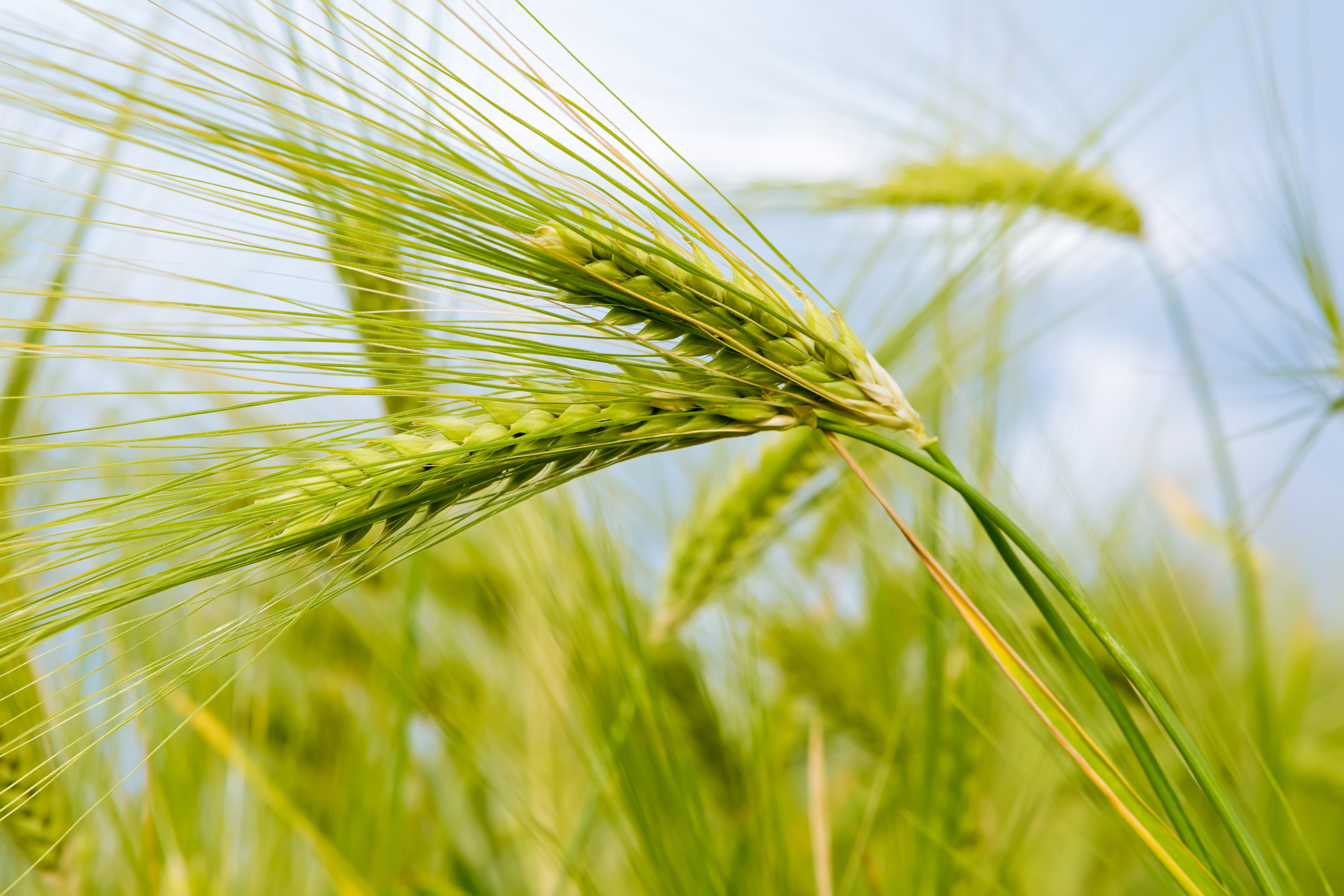
Rice

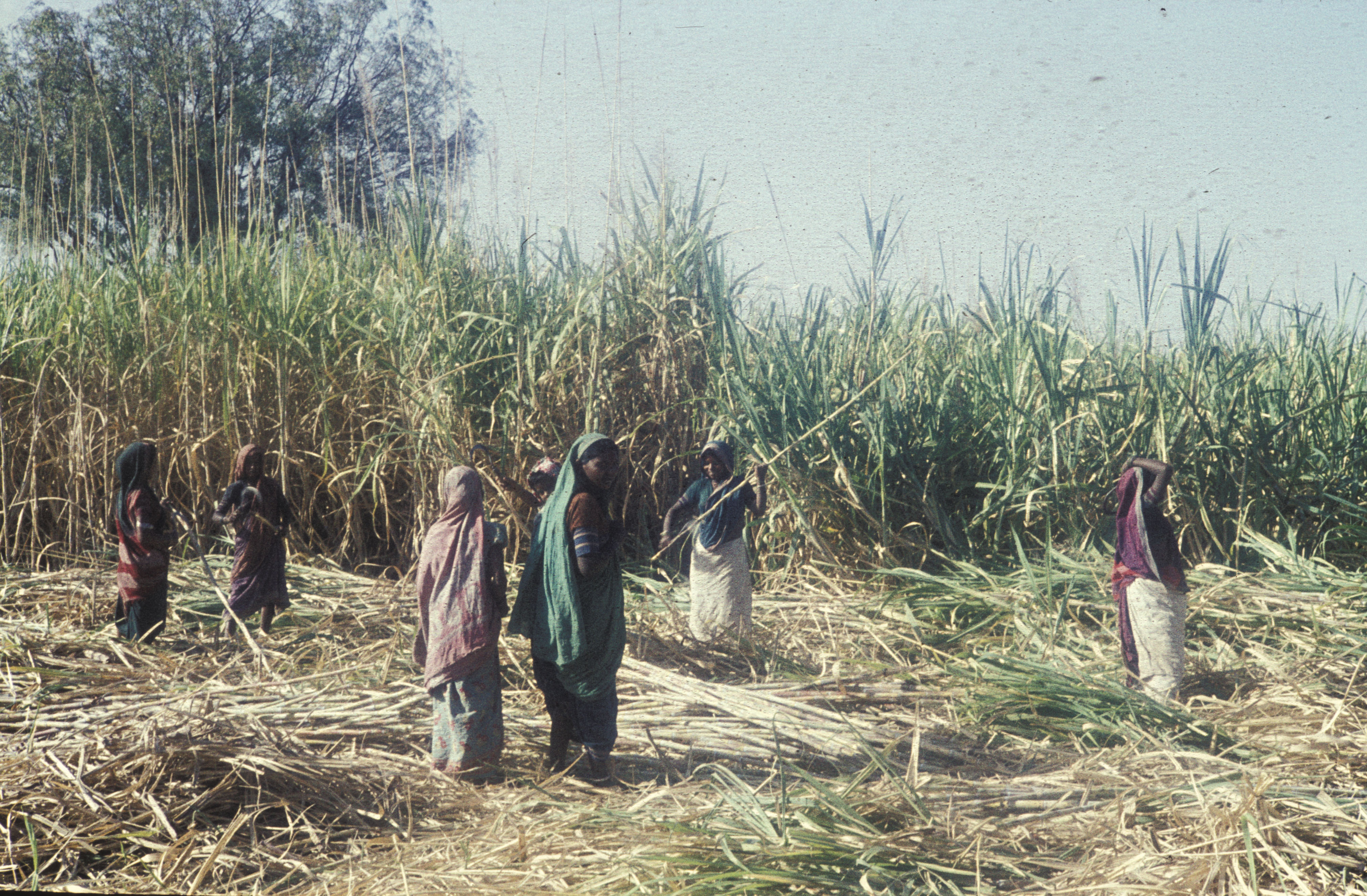
Sugarcane

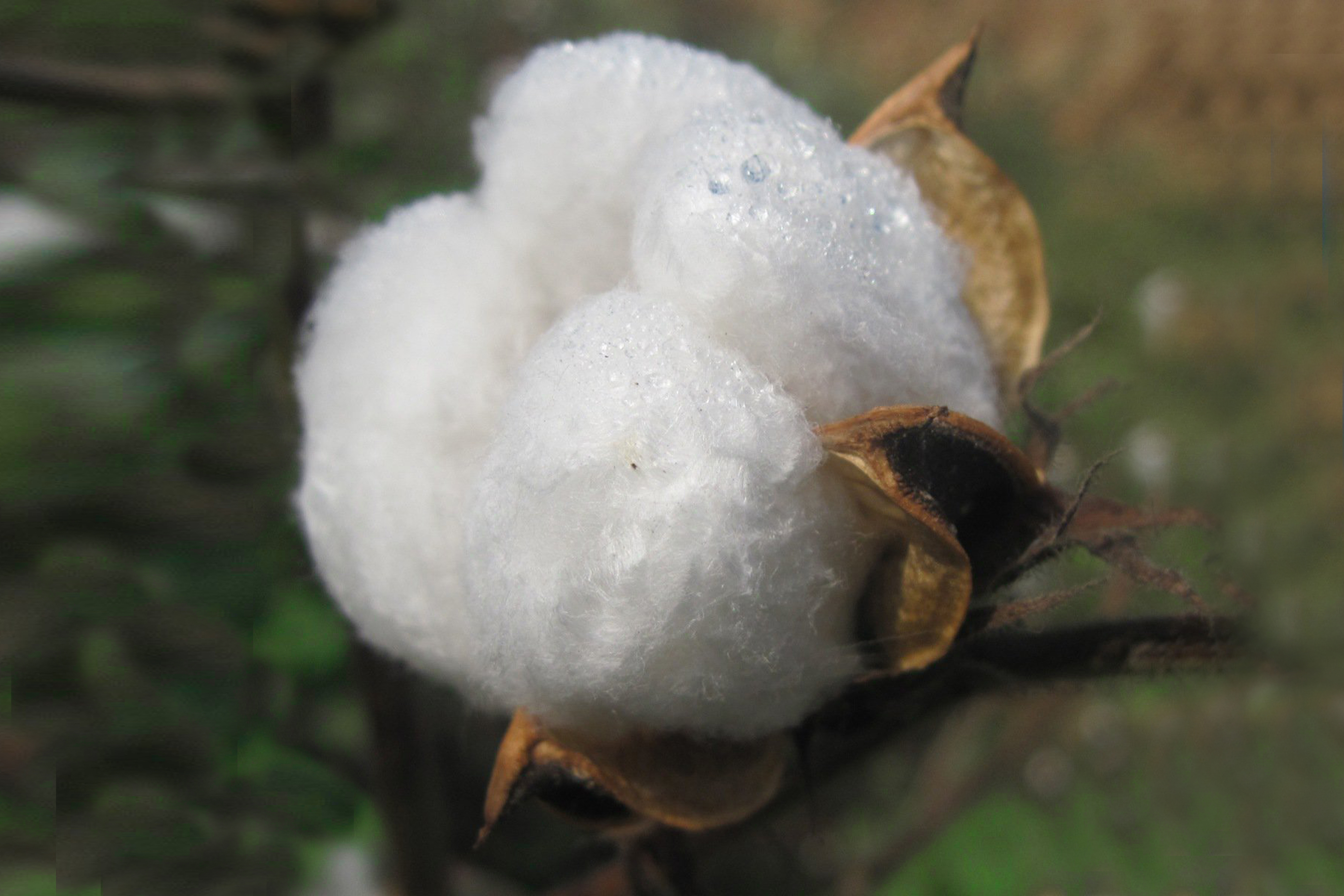
Cotton

Among food grains wheat and rice have unintentionally benefitted from biased implementation of MSP to the detriment of other crops covered under MSP such as pulses and oilseeds. Among other crops sugar cane and cotton have benefitted.

A total of 23 commodities are covered by MSP mechanism: including FRP for Sugarcane.

- Cereals:
1. Paddy
2. Wheat
3. Maize
4. Sorghum
5. Pearl millet
6. Barley
7. Ragi
- Pulses:
1. Chickpea / Gram / Gramme
2. Tur
3. Moong
4. Urad
5. Lentil
- Oilseeds:
1. Peanut
2. Rapeseed
3. Soyabean
4. Sesame
5. Sunflower
6. Safflower
7. Niger seed
- Commercial crops:
1. Copra
2. Sugarcane
3. Cotton
4. Raw jute

== Timeline ==
- 1964: Under L. K. Jha, the Report of the Jha Committee on Foodgrain Prices was the first step in organizing an agricultural price policy for the country.
- January 1965: Agricultural Prices Commission (APC) set up.
- August 1965: Under M. L. Dantwala, APC submits its first report. The commission suggests MSPs for paddy.
- 1985: Agricultural Prices Commission reconstituted as the Commission for Agricultural Costs and Prices (CACP).
- 1980: S. R. Sen Committee publishes report Cost of Cultivation.
- 1990: C. H. Hanumantha Rao report.
- 2015: Shanta Kumar Committee Report recommends better price support for pulses and oilseeds. It also suggests competitive MSPs with regard to imports.
- 2018: The finance minister announces that MSP on Kharif crops will be 50% more the production cost.
- 2020: Farmers demand MSP guarantee as part of the demands during the 2020–2021 Indian farmers' protest.

== Challenges ==
On a larger scale, trade policy is disconnected from MSP.

Disparity among states

- For example, In 2021, 95% paddy growers in Punjab benefited from MSP, while mere 3.6% in UP.

Skewed Procurement

- Largely confined to rice & wheat.

Ecological harm

- it promotes rice-wheat system, thereby causing
  - Water scarcity
  - Soil & Water pollution
  - Stubble burning etc.

Fiscal burden

- in 2023-24 budget, food & fertilizer subsidy alone constituted 1/8th of total Budget.

Inflation

- Economics have noted around 15 bps rise in inflation per 1 percentage point rise in MSP.

WTO issue

- Under India's Public Stockholding Policy, the government, through agencies like the Food Corporation of India (FCI), procures crops like rice and wheat from farmers at the Minimum Support Price (MSP) to be distributed under welfare schemes such as the Public Distribution System (PDS). However, procurement at prices higher than market prices is considered to be subsidized, as per WTO rules. Hence, the support provided is counted towards the overall ceiling on trade-distorting support (Amber Box measures). Thus, it should not breach the ceiling (de minimis)—10% of the value of total production, as set by the WTO for developing nations under the Agreement on Agriculture. However, India has breached this limit. For example, it informed the WTO that the value of rice production in 2022-23 was $52.8 billion, while it provided subsidies of $6.39 billion, equaling 12.1%. Thus, for the fifth time, India has invoked the Peace Clause set out in the Bali Ministerial Decision on Public Stockholding for Food Security Purposes, which allows developing nations to breach the ceiling without legal consequences, though as an interim measure until a permanent solution is achieved.

== See also ==
- Minimum wage
- Deficiency payments
- Direct Benefit Transfer
- Cash transfer
- Maximum retail price
- Recommended retail price
- Doubling farmers' income
