= 2014 in Maharashtra =

Events in the year 2014 in the state of Maharashtra in India.

== Incumbents ==
Photo	Post	Name	Current Status
	(India) Chief Minister	Devendra Fadnavis	31 October 2014 – Incumbent
	(India) Governor	C. Vidyasagar Rao	30 August 2014 – Present

== General Elections ==
=== Lok Sabha ===
Results for General elections to Lok Sabha was declared on 17 May 2014. Outcomes were as follows:

Party	Constituencies	Won
BJP	18	18
SHS	16	16
INC	2	2
NCP	4	4

== Events ==
=== October ===
- 15 October 2014: 2014 Maharashtra Legislative Assembly election
- 30 October 2014: Devendra Fadnavis sworn in as the 18th Chief Minister of Maharashtra.
