= Shanta Kumar Committee =

Government-appointed committee in India

The Shanta Kumar Committee, officially known as the High-Level Committee on Reorienting the Role and Restructuring of the Food Corporation of India (FCI), was a government-appointed committee in India established in August 2014 to review and recommend reforms for the Food Corporation of India (FCI). Chaired by Shanta Kumar, a former Chief Minister of Himachal Pradesh and senior Bharatiya Janata Party (BJP) leader, the committee submitted its report to Prime Minister Narendra Modi in January 2015. The committee's recommendations focused on improving the efficiency of FCI's operations in procurement, storage, and distribution of food grains, as well as restructuring India’s food security system.

== Background ==
The Food Corporation of India, established in 1965, is a statutory body responsible for ensuring food security through procurement, storage, and distribution of food grains under the National Food Security Act, 2013 (NFSA).

Over the years, FCI faced challenges such as inefficiencies in procurement, high operational costs, and issues with storage and distribution.

In response, the Government of India, under Prime Minister Narendra Modi, formed the Shanta Kumar Committee on 20 August 2014, to suggest measures for restructuring FCI and improving food grain management.

The committee included six members and a special invitee, with notable members such as agricultural economist Ashok Gulati.

== Objectives ==
The committee was tasked with:

• Examining the administrative, functional, and financial structure of FCI.

• Suggesting models to improve FCI's operational efficiency and financial management.

• Reorienting FCI's role in Minimum Support Price (MSP) operations, storage, and distribution under the Targeted Public Distribution System (TPDS).

• Proposing cost-effective models for storage and movement of food grains and integration of the supply chain.

The committee conducted extensive consultations with Chief Ministers, Food Secretaries, and other stakeholders across various states, and invited public suggestions through newspapers.

== Key recommendations ==
The Shanta Kumar Committee's report, submitted on 20 January 2015, proposed several reforms to enhance FCI's efficiency and address food security challenges.

Key recommendations included:

1. Reduction in NFSA Coverage: The committee recommended reducing the coverage of the National Food Security Act from 67% to 40% of the population to focus subsidies on the most vulnerable. It also suggested increasing the per-person grain entitlement from 5 kg to 7 kg and linking subsidised prices to MSP to control fiscal deficits.

2. Decentralised Procurement: FCI should hand over procurement of wheat, paddy, and rice to states with sufficient infrastructure and experience, such as Andhra Pradesh, Chhattisgarh, Haryana, Madhya Pradesh, Odisha, and Punjab. FCI would accept surplus grains from these states for distribution to deficit states, focusing its own procurement efforts on states with weak procurement systems, such as Eastern Uttar Pradesh, Bihar, West Bengal, and Assam.

3. Outsourcing Storage: The committee proposed outsourcing FCI's stocking operations to agencies like the Central Warehousing Corporation, State Warehousing Corporations, and private sector entities under the Private Entrepreneur Guarantee (PEG) scheme.

4. Direct Benefit Transfers: It recommended adopting cash transfers for MSP and food subsidies, starting in cities with populations over one million, to reduce costs associated with procurement, storage, and distribution. The committee estimated savings of ₹33,000 crore through this method.

5. Negotiable Warehouse Receipt System: The committee suggested promoting a Negotiable Warehouse Receipt System, allowing farmers to store produce in authorized warehouses, obtain receipts, and secure loans against them (up to 80% of MSP value). This would reduce distress sales and compensate farmers for market prices below MSP without FCI procuring excess grains.

6. Ending State Bonuses: The committee advised stopping bonuses on MSP paid by states to farmers, arguing that such bonuses distort procurement and lead to inefficiencies.

== Reception and impact ==
The committee's recommendations sparked significant debate. Supporters, including Shanta Kumar, described the reforms as a "magic wand" for addressing farm and hunger distress, emphasising efficiency and cost savings. However, critics, such as the Communist Party of India (Marxist), argued that the recommendations, particularly the reduction in NFSA coverage, would undermine food security by limiting access to subsidised grains and reintroducing flawed Above Poverty Line (APL) and Below Poverty Line (BPL) classifications. They also criticised the committee's reliance on questionable data, such as an NSSO survey claiming only 6% of farmers benefited from MSP, which conflicted with actual procurement figures.

The government considered the recommendations, with Union Minister Ram Vilas Paswan emphasising streamlining FCI operations in line with the report.

Some suggestions, such as direct benefit transfers, influenced schemes like the PM Kisan Samman Nidhi Yojana.

== Criticism ==
The committee's report was criticised for its perceived bias toward privatisation and market-driven approaches. Critics argued that reducing NFSA coverage and promoting cash transfers could weaken the Public Distribution System (PDS) and exclude vulnerable populations. The recommendation to limit FCI’s procurement role was seen as potentially harmful to farmers in states with weak procurement infrastructure.
