= Chennamaneni Rajeshwara Rao =

Indian politician

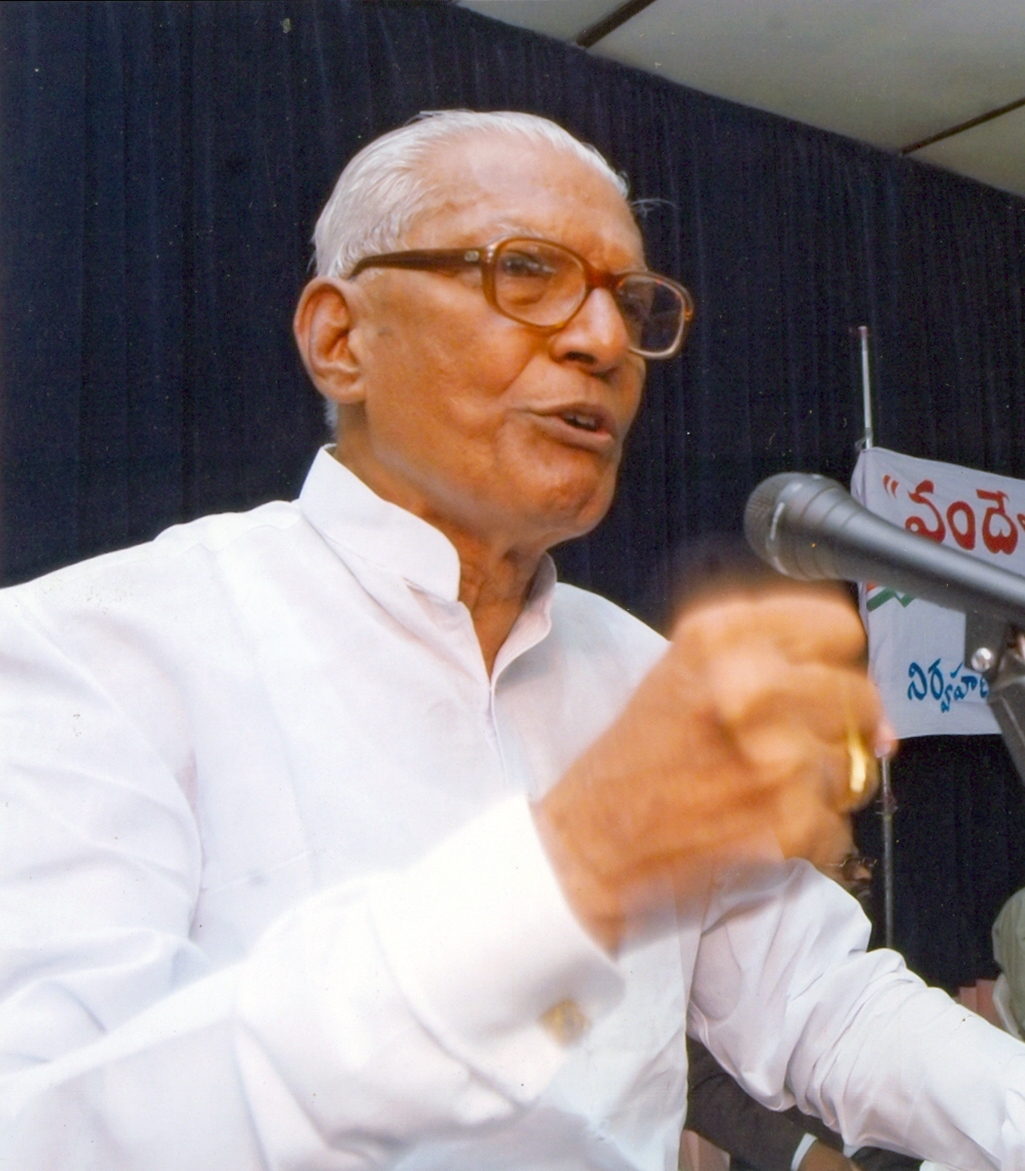
- Chennamaneni Rajeshwara Rao in 2010

Member of Legislative Assembly, Andhra Pradesh
- Constituency: Sircilla
- In office 13 May 1957 – 12 May 2009

Personal details
- Born: 31 August 1923 Karimnagar, Hyderabad State (now in Telangana, India)
- Died: 9 May 2016
- Party: Communist Party of India, later joined Telugu Desam Party
- Spouse: Ch Lalita Devi
- Children: Chennamaneni Ramesh
- Relatives: C. H. Hanumantha Rao (brother); C. Vidyasagar Rao (brother)
- Education: Bachelor of Science; Bachelor of Laws
- Alma mater: Osmania University

Chennamaneni Rajeshwara Rao (31 August 1923 - 9 May 2016) was an Indian communist leader and politician from the state of Telangana (former part of Andhra Pradesh). Between 1957 and 2004 he got elected six times to the State Legislative Assembly.

Rajeshwara Rao was active in the Quit India Movement and the struggle against the Nizam's rule of Hyderabad. During the resistance he spent 5 years underground and in jail before entering electoral politics following the integration of Hyderabad state into the Indian Union. He was a long-time member of the Communist Party of India and in 1999 joined the Telugu Desam Party. He retired from active politics in 2009.

== Early life and education ==
Rajeshwara Rao was born to Chennamaneni Chandramma and Srinivasa Rao in the Marupaka village of Vemulawada Urban mandal, Karimnagar district, on 31 August 1923. He was the third child and had eight sisters and three brothers. According to his autobiography, he was interested in issues of social justice in Telangana from an early age on and often had the opportunity to observe the discussions of Andhra Mahasabha leaders, Polkampalli Venkatrama Rao and Baddam Yella Reddy, particularly when its fourth conference was held in Sircilla in 1935. Influenced by this movement he later came into contact with Marxist ideology. In 1942, he joined the Communist Party of India and in 1944 became regular member of the party. Rajeshwara Rao attended Karimnagar High School till 1943 and subsequently entered Osmania University to become a lawyer.

=== Student years ===
Rajeshwara Rao was part of the Osmania University Students Union and the All Hyderabad Students Union. During his student years, Rajeshwara Rao worked as a student organizer and went on to become a leader of the Osmania University Students Union. He participated in the railway strike. He graduated in 1947, B.Sc. and left University as part of the Quit College Movement to actively participate in the ongoing Freedom struggle, he later completed his LL.B. in 1963.

== Freedom struggle ==
As a student Rajeshwara Rao joined the Telangana Armed Struggle against Nizam of Hyderabad and actively participated in Freedom Movement of India. He worked under veteran Telangana Armed Struggle leader Ravi Narayana Reddy. Due to his active participation in the Telangana Rebellion against the ruling Nizam of Hyderabad, Rajeshwara Rao lived underground from September 1947 till October 1951 when he was arrested under the Preventive Detention Act (PDA). In this period of underground and jail life, Rajeshwara Rao, his wife Lalitha, their two daughters Aruna and Kalpana, both born in this period, and his brother Ch. Hanumantha Rao faced severe hardships. Rajeshwara Rao worked closely with famous Urdu poet Makhdoom Mohiuddin when they all lived in underground dens in Sabzeemandi and chikkadpally, before being arrested.

While underground, he organised different student actions, like hosting the Indian flag on Independence day, 15 August as well as the training of students for the armed struggle of Telangana. In 1948, he got elected General Secretary of the AHSU in a secret meeting and led a delegation to the South East Asian Youth Conference in Kolkata the same year. He also attended the second congress of the CPI in Calcutta in 1948. After he was released on parole in February 1952, Rajeshwara Rao advocated the implementation of the Tenancy and Land Reform legislation and was soon rearrested. Only after the ruling of the Indian Supreme Court declaring the PDA unconstitutional, Rajeshwara Rao was ultimately freed months later. He served as the Acting District Secretary of the CPI till 1956 and subsequently got elected D.C. Secretary.

== Political career ==
Rajeshwara Rao was active in movements like the Andhra Mahasabha, during the Telangana Armed Struggle, as a farmers organizer (Kisan), and later as a long time legislator. Highly influenced by leaders like Anabheri Prabhakara Rao and Singireddy Bhupathi Reddy in Karimnagar district, Rajeshwara Rao worked with tenants and landless against the feudal system of the Nizam. He supported the implementation of land and tenant reforms and the redistribution of government lands in the last decade of the 1940s and beginning of the 1950s.

Rajeshwara Rao highlights in his autobiography the close work with Baddam Yella Reddy, Amritlal Shukla, K.V.Damodhara Rao, Eleti Raji Reddy, Joginipalli Ananda Rao, Polasani Chokka Rao, Mukund Lal Mishra, Baddam Malla Reddy, Japa Laxma Reddy, Ch. Venkat Rama Rao, Desini Mallayya, Annaboina Mallayya, Poodari Yellaiah, L. Muttayya, S. Nambaiah, Thakur Raja Ram Singh, Shyam Sunder Singh and many others.

Rajeshwara Rao could not contest the first general elections held in February 1952 because he was released from jail on the last date of nomination and could not reach Metpalli, where he was supposed to contest on behalf of People's Democratic Front - a proxy for the Communist Party of India which was still banned at this time. In 1957, Rajeshwara Rao was elected to the first Legislative Assembly of Andhra Pradesh from the Choppadandi constituency. Throughout his career as a Member of the Legislative Assembly (MLA), he served the Karimnagar district and got re-elected five times from Sircilla and once from Choppadandi in the following years. He worked as Chief Whip of the CPI in the state parliament between 1957 and 1962 and then returned to university to finish his law degree in 1963. In the following three years he practised law in the Karimnagar District Court before re-entering the Legislative Assembly in 1967 and working as the CPI floor leader till 1972. He also served as a member of the CPI central committee for several years.

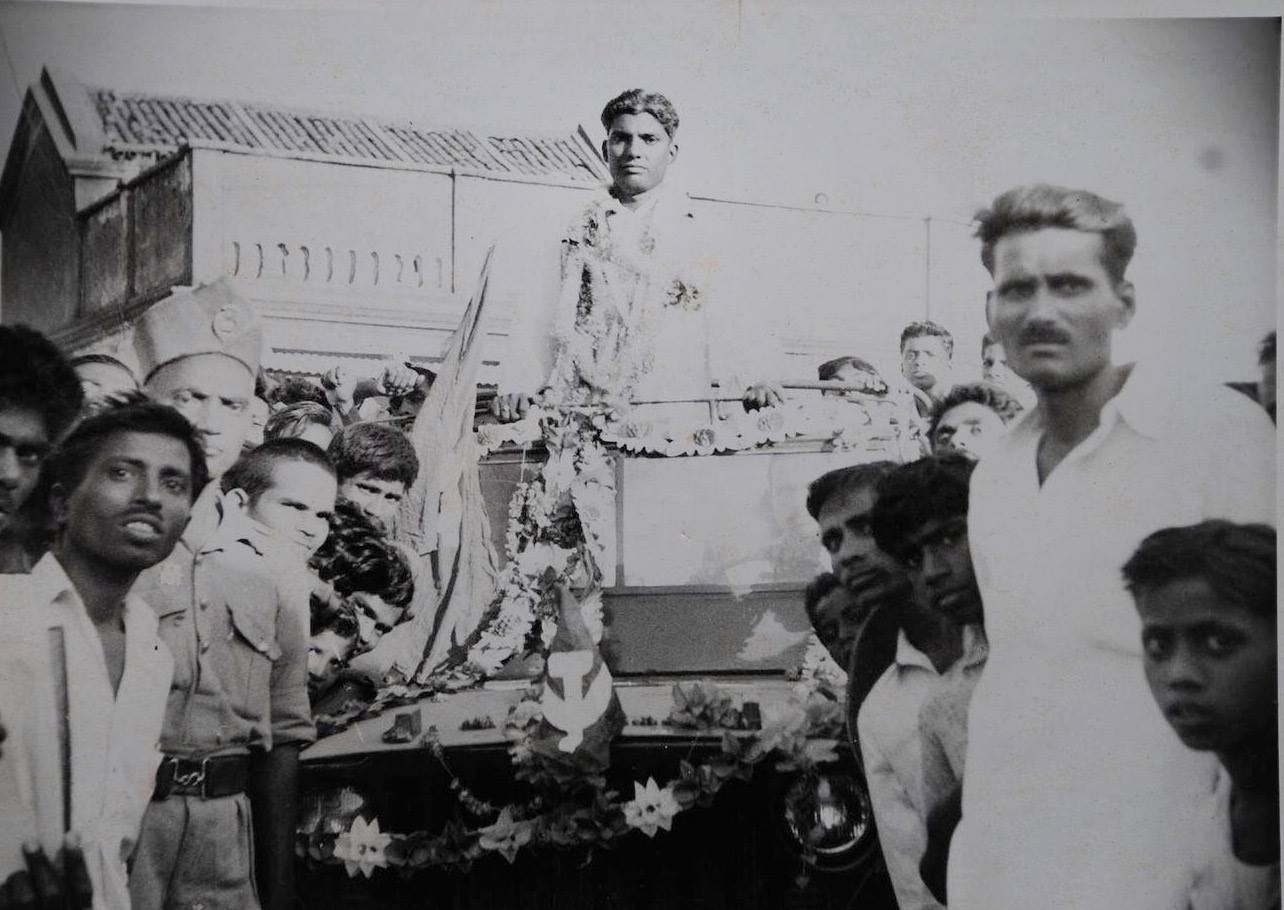
Rajeshwara Rao, election rally of the Communist Party of India (~1957)

Rajeshwara Rao was President of the Freedom Fighters Steering Committee appointed by the Ministry of Home Affairs, Government of India, from 1996 to 1998 and was instrumental in achieving pensions for freedom fighters of the Telangana Rebellion.

Despite being one of the founding stalwarts of the Communist Movement in Telangana, in 1999, he sent a shockwave in political circles by snapping decades old relations with CPI and joined Telugu Desam Party (TDP) led by Chandra Babu Naidu. Rajeshwara Rao lost the subsequent elections in 1999 but got elected as an TDP MLA in 2004. After serving the term he retired in 2009.

After leaving the CPI, Rajeshwara Rao continued to work through an NGO, the Self Employed Welfare Society (SEWS) with a number of projects supported by the German government, the European Union and Andhra Pradesh government. He was also working for the Freedom Fighters’ Organization, of which he was president until his demise. Rajeshwara Rao along with Devender Goud and others were instrumental in the TDP to convince Chandrababu Naidu to adopt separate Telangana resolution in TDP Mahanadu in May 2008. However, due to Naidu's reluctance Devender Goud quit the TDP. After Rajeshwara Rao's retirement from active politics at the age of 87, his son Ch Ramesh was elected in 2009 to the assembly as a candidate of TDP/TRS alliance.

=== Legislative work ===
Rajeshwara Rao's 30-year legislative career started in 1957 when he was elected as an MLA and became Chief Whip of the Communist Party, while Puchalapalli Sundarayya was the leader and Ravi Narayana Reddy and Arutla Kamala Devi were Deputy Leaders. Due to Rajeshwara Rao, his main concern was to serve the poor population of Telangana throughout his career. Besides supporting extensive land reforms he implemented a rural development program in Sircilla to electrify 175 villages by establishing a Cooperative Electric Supply Society (CESS) in the course of 5 years. He initiated the Mula Vagu (Nimmapalli) irrigation Project for the benefit of dry land farmers. He promoted education, upgraded schools and opened new colleges and a polytechnic and degree college in Siricilla. The policies also brought a 50% power subsidy to all powerloom weavers of Siricilla region. He contributed to the report of the backward class commission.

=== Criticism ===
Rajeshwara Rao moved a motion of privilege in the AP assembly against C. Rajagopalachari, the then CM of Madras, for his un-parliamentary remarks about communists. This notice was admitted by the speaker of the house and a notice was issued to the CM of Madras, upon which the CM regretted his remarks. Rajeshwara Rao has very openly expressed his serious concern about the quality and calibre of the people's representatives when compared to earlier decades. He argued that people with ability and capacity stay away from politics, while people with vested interests are very much interested to acquire political power. Moreover, he thinks that the membership of a party must be based on the actual contribution of the person to the service of the people. Besides the criticism Rajeshwara Rao faced when he objected to his own party's line, he also spurred controversy for leaving the CPI and for his remarks that the founder of the TDP, N.T. Rama Rao should be hanged for ignoring the development of Andhra Pradesh.

== Family ==
In May 1944, Rajeshwara Rao married Smt. Lalita Devi, they have four children, Aruna, Kalpana, Prabha and Ramesh.The Chennamaneni family represents a unique combination of different political ideologies. Rajeshwara Rao was a staunch communist, freedom fighter and a proven parliamentarian, while one of his brothers, the renowned economist Ch. Hanumantha Rao, is a nehruvian socialist and served as a member of the National Planning Commission under Rajiv Gandhi led Congress Government. Whereas another brother Ch. Venkateshwar Rao is a social worker. His youngest brother is Ch. Vidyasagar Rao, member of the BJP and presently the governor of Maharashtra. Rajeshwara Rao's son, Ramesh serves as a MLA from Vemulawada, and his nephew (sister's son), B. Vinod Kumar is a Member of Parliament; both of them belong to the Telangana Rashtra Samithi (TRS).
