= Essential Services Maintenance Act, 1968 =

1968 act of the Parliament of India

Parliament of India
- Long title: An Act to provide for the maintenance of certain essential services and the normal life of the community.
- Citation: Act No. 59 of 1968
- Territorial extent: India
- Enacted by: Parliament of India

Keywords
- essential service, strike
- Status: Expired

The Essential Services Maintenance Act, 1968 (ESMA) is an act of Parliament of India which was established to ensure the delivery of certain services, which if obstructed would affect the normal life of the people. This include services like public transport (bus services), health services (doctors and hospitals). The ESMA is a law made by the Parliament of India under List No. 33 in Concurrent List of 7th Schedule of Constitution of India. Hence it maintains national uniformity by providing minimum conditions of essential services across the nation. For any violations in specific regions, State governments alone or together with other state government can enforce their respective act. Each state has a separate state Essential Services Maintenance Act with slight variations from the central law in its provisions. Hence, in case the nature of strike disrupts only a state or states, then the states can invoke it. In case of disruption on a national scale, especially railways, the ESMA 1968 can be invoked by central government.

Although it is a very powerful law, which has potential to suppress genuine demands of employees, its execution rests entirely on the discretion of the State government in normal circumstances. The law has seen little use in India, with many strikes by public transport providers or staff, doctors or Government employees, being continued for weeks without ESMA being invoked by the Union Government or the State Government. There have been instances of citizens approaching courts for implementation of ESMA, and the executive being forced by court orders to declare ESMA over a strike and the strikes being called off overnight.

== History ==
The 1968 Act had a sunset provision of 3 years as per section 1(3) of the Act. Accordingly, the Act expired on 28 December 1971. Subsequently, the Essential Services Maintenance Act, 1981 was enacted, with a sunset provision of 4 years, which was extended to 9 years by the 1985 amendment. Accordingly, the 1981 Act expired on 23 September 1990.

== State Laws ==
=== Andhra Pradesh ===
The law in effect is the Andhra Pradesh Essential Services Maintenance Act of 1971.

=== Kerala ===
The Kerala Essential Services Maintenance Act, 1994. This is the law in effect in the state of Kerala since 1994. As is the general rule, it has slight variations in the provisions of the law from the central act. What existed before this act was the Kerala Essential Services Maintenance Ordinance of 1993.

=== Rajasthan ===
In Rajasthan this law is known as RESMA (Rajasthan Essential Services Maintenance Act),(1970)

=== Karnataka ===
The Government of Karnataka enacted Karnataka Essential Services Maintenance Act in 1994 and was in force since 16 April 1994. The life of the act was ten years as per section 1(3) and it lapsed on 15 April 2004. The Government of Karnataka has threatened to invoke the act multiple times since then, even though the act had lapsed in 2004. However, the state has the power to impose the central law without modification unless it enacts a new law suitable for it. The Government of Karnataka has planned to reintroduce ESMA with Karnataka Essential Services Maintenance Bill, 2013 which will be tabled in the winter session of the legislature.

Esma has been re-introduced in Karnataka effective from 09/06/2015 as per the gazette notification on 28 May 2015. The term now extends to one year from commencement of the Act and can be extended for six more months.

=== Uttar Pradesh ===
The state has Uttar Pradesh Essential Services Maintenance Act, 1966 (U.P. Act 30 of 1966), which was amended in 1982 and 1983. This Act does not have any sunset provision, and gets imposed from time to time, under section 3(1) of the Act, for six months at a time. It was recently imposed on 22 May 2020, 25 November 2020, 25 May 2021 and 16 February 2024.

== See also ==
- Essential Commodities Act

== Notes ==
DTC drivers' strike: Delhi government imposes ESMA

Delhi govt imposes ESMA on doctors on strike. Step was taken as the doctors continued there strike even after government agreed to all their demands. Doctors call off strike hours after AAP govt imposes ESMA.
