= Eighth Finance Commission =

1984 finance commission of India

The Eighth Finance Commission of India was constituted by the President of India, on 28 April 1984 under the chairmanship of Shri Y.B. Chavan.

== Members ==
The commission consisted of the following members:

- Shri Y.B. Chavan, Chairman
- Shri Justice Sabya Sachi Mukherjee, resigned during the term of the Commission
- Dr. C. H. Hanumantha Rao
- Shri G.C. Baveja
- Shri A.R. Shirali
- Shri Justice T.P.S. Chawla, in place of Sabya Sachi Mukherjee
- Shri N.V. Krishnan, Secretary

== Terms of Reference ==
The commission was asked to make recommendations on

- The distribution of net proceeds of taxes between the union and the states which are to be or may be divided between them under chapter 1 of Part XII of the Constitution and allocation between the states of the respective shares of the same
- The principles which govern the grants in aid of the revenues of the states out of the Consolidated Fund of India and the amount to be paid to the needy States which seek assistance by way of grants in aid of their revenues under Article 275 of the Constitution for purposes other than those specified in the provisions to clause (i) of that article

The commission is to examine the possibility for increasing revenue from the taxes and duties mentioned in Article 269 of the constitution but which are not levied at present. It will probe into the scope for enhancing revenue from the duties mentioned in the Article 268. Making an assessment of the non plan capital gap of the states on a uniform and comparable basis for the 5 years ending with 1988-89 also comes under its agenda. It will review the policy and arrangement in regards to the financing of relief expenditure by the States affected by natural calamities and make appropriate suggestions. The commission shall make its report by 31 October 1986 on each of the matters aforesaid.

The major objective of the Eighth Finance Commission was to reduce interstate disparities through their scheme of devolution.

== Recommendations ==
- Sharing of Income Tax – To retain the share of the States in the proceeds of the income tax at 85% level. Withdrawal of surcharge on income tax from the financial year 1985-86 is also recommended
- Union Excise Duties – Recommended its increase from 40% to 45%. It made a beginning by using one unified formula to distribute the net yield from Union Excise Duties and 90% share of the income tax
- Additional Excise Duties – The distribution from the net yield from additional duties of the excise was made 50% on the basis of the share of each state in the average state domestic products of all the states for the years from 1976–1977 to 1978-1979 and 50% on the basis of the population figures as given in 1971 Census
- Grants in Lieu of tax on railway passenger fare – It has boldly defended the case of the state government in regard to their claim on the tax on railway fair. The compensatory grant which replaced the tax was increased to Rs. 95 crores
- Grants in Aid – They have been made more flexible. The commission has provided for an annual growth of 5% in respect of the amount of grants payable in nature of the forecast period commencing from 1984 to 1985
- The recommendation to write off a substantial portion of loan amounting to Rs. 2285.39 crores is an appropriate step towards strengthening the state finances
