= Chennamaneni Ramesh =

Indian politician

Member of Telangana Legislative Assembly
- In office 2009–2023
- Preceded by: Aadi Srinivas
- Constituency: Vemulawada

Personal details
- Born: 3 February 1956 (age 70) Karimnagar, Hyderabad State, India
- Citizenship: India (until 1993; 2008–2024); Germany (1993–2008; 2024–present)
- Party: Bharat Rashtra Samithi (2010–2024)
- Other political affiliations: Telugu Desam Party (2009–2010)
- Spouse: Maria
- Children: 3
- Parent: Chennamaneni Rajeshwara Rao (father)
- Relatives: C. Vidyasagar Rao (uncle); C. H. Hanumantha Rao (uncle)
- Education: B.Sc., M.Sc. (Agriculture); Ph.D. (Humboldt University)

Chennamaneni Ramesh (born 3 February 1956) is a German-Indian former politician. He is a German citizen and also contested Telangana Legislative Assembly. He won four times as an MLA from the Vemulawada constituency in the Telangana Legislative Assembly, three time on Bharat Rashtra Samithi ticket. After denying a ticket for the 2023 elections due to his pending citizenship case in the high court, the then chief minister K. Chandrashekar Rao appointed him as the advisor to the Government of Telangana on agricultural affairs with a Cabinet rank on 25 August 2023 for a five-year term.

== Early life ==
Ramesh was born on 3 February 1956 in Karimnagar. His father Rajeshwara Rao (1923 – 2016) was a communist leader. His uncle C. Vidyasagar Rao served as the Governor of Maharashtra. He completed his M.Sc. in Agriculture at Leipzig, and obtained his Ph.D. from Humboldt University of Berlin in 1987.

== Political career ==
Ramesh began his political career in 2009 when he was elected as an MLA from Vemulawada constituency representing the Telugu Desam Party in Andhra Pradesh Legislative Assembly.

In 2010, he joined the Telangana Rashtra Samithi and was re-elected in a 2010 bypoll. He was re-elected to the Telangana Legislative Assembly in 2014 and 2018.

== Citizenship issue ==
Ramesh moved to Germany in the 1990s for employment. He obtained German citizenship in 1993 and surrendered his Indian passport. He returned to India in 2008 and re-applied for the Indian citizenship which was granted by the Ministry of Home Affairs (MHA).

In 2013, Hyderabad High Court annulled Ramesh's candidature to the assembly based on the case filed by his opponent Adi Srinivas, who alleged that Ramesh obtained citizenship by submitting fake documents. However, Ramesh appealed to the Supreme Court of India and obtained a stay.

In December 2017, the Union government has cancelled Ramesh's citizenship but the Hyderabad High Court directed the MHA to re-examine based on Ramesh's appeal. The MHA re-iterated the same in 2019 by issuing a fresh order but Ramesh obtained a stay order from the High Court. In August 2021, the High Court noted that a by-election would be required if the charges on Ramesh's German citizenship were proven.

== Personal life ==
Ramesh married Maria, a German citizen. The couple has 2 sons and a daughter.
