= Vemulawada Assembly constituency =

Constituency of the Telangana legislative assembly in India

Coordinates: 18.47°N 78.87°E

Vemulawada
- Constituency No. 28 for the Telangana Legislative Assembly
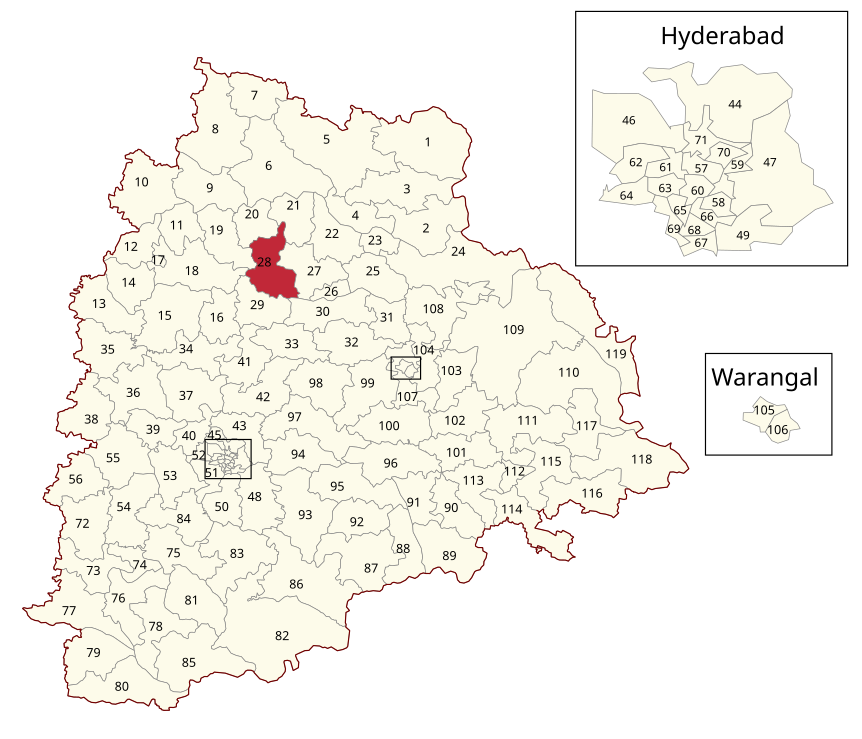
- Location of Vemulawada Assembly constituency within Telangana

Constituency details
- Country: India
- Region: South India
- State: Telangana
- District: Rajanna Sircilla
- Lok Sabha constituency: Karimnagar
- Established: 2008
- Total electors: 1,67,490
- Reservation: None

Member of Legislative Assembly
- 3rd Telangana Legislative Assembly
- Incumbent Aadi Srinivas
- Party: Indian National Congress
- Elected year: 2023

Vemulawada Assembly constituency is a constituency of Telangana Legislative Assembly, India. It is one of two constituencies in Rajanna Sircilla district. It includes the temple town of Vemulawada and part of Karimnagar Lok Sabha constituency.

Chennamaneni Ramesh of Telangana Rashtra Samithi represented the constituency since its inception in 2009 to 2023. Aadi Srinivas won the 2023 Telangana Legislative Assembly election and is the current MLA.

== Mandals ==
The Assembly Constituency presently comprises the following Mandals:

Mandal	Districts
Vemulawada	Rajanna Sircilla
Konaraopeta	Rajanna Sircilla
Chandurthi	Rajanna Sircilla
Kathlapur	Jagtial
Medipalle	Jagtial
Rudrangi	Rajanna Sircilla
Vemulawada Rural	Rajanna Sircilla

== Members of Legislative Assembly ==
Duration	Member	Political party
Andhra Pradesh
2009	Chennamaneni Ramesh	Telugu Desam Party
2010★	Chennamaneni Ramesh	Bharat Rashtra Samithi
Telangana
2014	Chennamaneni Ramesh	Telangana Rashtra Samithi
2018	Chennamaneni Ramesh	Telangana Rashtra Samithi
2023	Aadi Srinivas	Indian National Congress

★by-election

=== Assembly Election 2023 ===
2023 Telangana Legislative Assembly election : Vemulawada
Party	Candidate	Votes	%	±%
INC	Aadi Srinivas	71,451	41.03%	▲5.07
BRS	Chalmeda Lakshmi Narasimha Rao	56,870	32.66%	▼21.44
BJP	Chennamaneni Vikas	29,710	17.06%	▲12.82
BSP	Dr. Goli Mohan	4,649	2.67%	▲1.31
Alliance of Democratic Reforms Party	Md. Akhil Pasha	2,836	1.63%	New
NOTA	None of the above	1,280	0.74%	▼0.37
Margin of victory		14,581	8.37%	▼9.77
Turnout		174,142	72.80%	▼2.38
Total valid votes		174,142		
INC gain from BRS		Swing	▲5.07	

=== Assembly Election 2018 ===
2018 Telangana Legislative Assembly election : Vemulawada
Party	Candidate	Votes	%	±%
TRS	Chennamaneni Ramesh	84,050	54.10%	▲11.31
INC	Aadi Srinivas	55,864	35.96%	New
BJP	Pratapa Ramakrishnan	6,592	4.24%	▼34.69
BSP	Bhoomesh Pittala	2,119	1.36%	▼0.42
NOTA	None of the above	1,729	1.11%	New
Margin of victory		28,186	18.14%	▲14.28
Turnout		155,354	75.18%	▲1.48
Total valid votes		155,354		
TRS hold		Swing	▲11.31	

=== Assembly Election 2014 ===
2014 Telangana Legislative Assembly election : Vemulawada
Party	Candidate	Votes	%	±%
TRS	Chennamaneni Ramesh	58,414	42.79%	▼22.63
BJP	Aadi Srinivas	53,146	38.93%	New
INC	Bomma Venkateshwar	14,051	10.29%	▼13.43
Independent	Naagula Narender	3,635	2.66%	New
BSP	Gaddam Ravinder Reddy	2,432	1.78%	New
Margin of victory		5,268	3.86%	▼37.84
Turnout		136,512	73.70%	▲1.35
Total valid votes		136,512		
TRS hold		Swing	▼22.63	

=== Assembly By-election 2010 ===
2010 Andhra Pradesh Legislative Assembly by-election : Vemulawada
Party	Candidate	Votes	%	±%
TRS	Chennamaneni Ramesh	79,146	65.42%	New
INC	Aadi Srinivas	28,695	23.72%	▼4.77
Independent	Devarakonda Srinivas	8,759	7.24%	New
TDP	G. V. Rao	4,387	3.63%	▼26.35
Margin of victory		50,451	41.70%	▲40.21
Turnout		120,987	72.35%	▲6.11
Total valid votes		120,987		
TRS gain from TDP		Swing	New	

=== Assembly Election 2009 ===
2009 Andhra Pradesh Legislative Assembly election : Vemulawada
Party	Candidate	Votes	%	±%
TDP	Chennamaneni Ramesh	36,601	29.98%	New
INC	Aadi Srinivas	34,780	28.49%	New
BJP	Chennamaneni Vidyasagar Rao	23,948	19.61%	New
PRP	Teegala Ravindra Goud	11,784	9.65%	New
Independent	Konda Devaiah	5,733	4.70%	New
Margin of victory		1,821	1.49%	New
Turnout		122,082	66.24%	New
Total valid votes		122,082		
TDP win		Swing	New	

== See also ==
- List of constituencies of Telangana Legislative Assembly
