= Seventh Finance Commission =

1978 finance commission of India

The Seventh Finance Commission of India was incorporated in 1978 consisting of Shri J. M. Shelar as the chairman.

== Members ==
The members of the Commission were:

- Shri J. M. Shelat, Chair
- Dr. Raj Krishna
- Dr. C. H. Hanumantha Rao
- Shri. H. N. Ray
- Shri. V. B. Eswaran, Member Secretary

== Recommendations ==
- The share of the states in the net proceeds should be raised to 85% excepting the share of the Union Territories which would be 2.19% of net proceeds
- The inter se distribution between the states should include 10% contribution factor and rest 90% would be on basis of population. The 10% allotment would be based on the State-wise net assessments
