= Aadi Srinivas =

Indian politician

Aadi Srinivas (born 1966) in Rudrangi is an Indian politician from Telangana state. He is a member of the Telangana Legislative Assembly from Vemulawada Assembly constituency in Rajanna Sircilla district. He represents Indian National Congress and won the 2023 Telangana Legislative Assembly election.

== Early life and education ==
Srinivas is from Vemulawada, Rajanna Sircilla district. His father is Aadi Govindu. He completed a diploma from Industrial Training Institute, Nizamabad.

== Career ==
Srinivas won from Vemulawada Assembly constituency in his third attempt. Representing Indian National Congress in the 2023 Telangana Legislative Assembly election, he polled 71,451 votes and defeated his nearest rival, Chalimeda Lakshmi Narasimha Rao of Bharat Rashtra Samithi by a margin of 14,581 votes. Contesting on Congress ticket, he lost the 2018 Telangana Legislative Assembly election from Vemulawada seat to Ramesh Chennamaneni of Telangana Rashtra Samithi by a margin of votes. Earlier in 2014, he contested on Bharatiya Janata Party ticket and lost to Ramesh by a margin of 5,268 votes.
