= Vikas Mishra (economist) =

Indian economist

- Born: 10 January 1924 (India)
- Died: 22 January 2008 (aged 84) (Kurukshetra), (Harayana), (India)
- Occupations: Economist, Professor
- Spouse: Suda Mishra

Academic background
- Education: (M.Com) (L.L.B) Lucknow University (M.A.) University of Manchester (PhD) London School of Economics
- Doctoral advisor: Sir William Arthur Lewis

Academic work
- Institutions: Delhi School of Economics; Delhi University; Institute of Economic Growth
- Doctoral students: C. H. Hanumantha Rao

Vikas Mishra (10 January 1924 – 22 January 2008) was an Indian economist who served as the vice-chancellor of Kurukshetra University, in Haryana. He joined the university in 1962 after serving in the Delhi School of Economics & the Institute of Economic Growth. He has completed his PhD from the London School of Economics and Political Science and research under the guidance of Nobel laureate Sir William Arthur Lewis.

== Education ==
After India's independence, Mishra, who was studying Law to help Indian anti-colonial activists, decided not to become a practising lawyer. Instead, he chose to dedicate himself towards teaching and research. He initially did his M.Com. and LL.B. from Lucknow University. After teaching for five years, he went to England in 1952 and earned his M.A.(Economics) from the University of Manchester and his PhD from the London School of Economics under Nobel laureate Sir William Arthur Lewis.

== Career ==
Mishra worked as a Senior Economist on the team of the Techno-Economic Survey of Bihar undertaken by the NCAER. He was also at the Delhi School of Economics and the Institute of Economic Growth, Delhi before shifting to Kurukshetra University where, later on, he became the Registrar & the youngest Vice-Chancellor.

== Contribution ==
Mishra's contributions were often quoted by noted scholars. In their books 'India: Social Structure' and 'Social Transformation in Modern India' by Indian sociologists MN Srinivas and A Kumar respectively, Kumar quoted Mishra by stating, "In his book Hinduism and Economic growth,1962, Dr. Vikas Mishra has made a study of the occupational patterns of the different religious groups in India". He concludes that the occupational distribution of the Parsis, Jews and Jains is “advanced” though not diversified. Hindus and Muslims have a diversified occupational pattern while the tribal's pattern is neither advanced nor diversified.

His analysis points to the conclusion that minority religions are advantageously situated as far as occupational distribution is concerned. It is likely, however, that there are differences between one region of India and another. Syrian Christians, for instance, show a more “advanced” pattern in Travancore than in North Kerala. Similarly, Moplahs in North Kerala are more advanced than their co-coreligionists in South and Central Kerala. This is perhaps related to the fact that in North Kerala the Moplahs formerly wielded political power."

Mishra’s concept of his “Growth Multiplier” precedes Professor Hirschman's "linkage effects" which is clear by his claim in his book "The Growth Multiplier and a General Theory of Economic Growth”, pp. 7. He says, “The direct investment effect sounds very much like Professor Hirschman’s linkage effects. But perhaps I should mention that two of my earlier drafts had been circulated before his Strategy of Economic Development was published.”

K S Chalam writes in his book Social Enquiry of Development in India, pp. 350, "It was Vikas Mishra who studied Hinduism and found that it was not conducive for rapid economic development due to several rigidities and perhaps prepared Raj Krishna later to coin what is called the Hindu rate of growth." Again at pp. 372 he writes, 'Vikas Mishra was an economist who worked on the Economics of Religion first time in India. Mishra, Hinduism and Economic Growth (New Delhi: Oxford University Press, 1962). Mishra trained Raj Krishna, Agricultural economist, Member, Planning Commission, who has coined the popular term "Hindu rate of growth".'

== Publications ==
Mishra wrote the following books:

- Hinduism and Economic Growth. Oxford University Press, 1962.
- The Growth Multiplier. Asia Publishing House, 1962.
- From the autobiography of economic theory and other reflections, 1980 ASIN B0006E4CK4
- The Study of Product Behaviour, 1984.
- Mujhe Koi Bulata Hai!, ISBN 9789353242138

== See also ==
- Baidyanath Misra
