= Kanagarthi, Rajanna Sircilla district =

Kanagarthi
- Revenue Village
- Country: India
- State: Telangana
- District: Rajanna Sircilla
- Mandal: Konaraopeta

Government
  - Sarpanch: Malyala Swamidasu
  - Sub Sarpanch: Vangapelli Shekar

Population (2011)
  - Total: 2,300
  - Men: 1,148
  - Women: 1,152
- Pin Code: 505301
- S.T.D Code: 08723
- Website: https://kanagarthi.blogspot.com/

Kanagarthi is one of the Villages in Konaraopeta mandal which is in Rajanna Sircilla District in Telangana State in India. Kanagarthi is surrounded by Dharmaram, Nizamabad, Mamidipalli, Palli Maktha and Suddala villages. It is located 16 km towards west from District headquarters Rajanna Sircilla

== History ==
First High School in Konaraopet Mandal. Vijaya Bank is also there.

"ZPHS Kanagarthi " is the first High School in the Konaraopeta Mandal. It was started in 1955. Students are taught from 6th to 10th standard. Apart from 8 subject teachers there is one Panel Grade Head Master, One PET, One Jr. Asst and One Record Asst. Total number of the students studying in the school during the academic year 2008-09 are 180. The school has a play ground of nearly 6 acres. It also has a well equipped Science Lab where children explore experiments.

== Education ==
From a decade there has been a good response for education. The literacy rate has been improved. Girl education is highly encouraged in the village. There are 2 Mandal Parishad Primary Schools, 1 Zilla Parishad High School, 2 Anganwadi centres and in the village. People prefer colleges in Sircilla, Karimnagar and Hyderabad for higher studies. Hundreds of students go to colleges in Sircilla as day scholars. Many students are joining in BTech/B.E courses. Recently professional degrees are becoming popular in the village and people are attracted to them.

== Culture & Entertainment ==
For approximately the past ten years, the cultural and entertainment programs held in this village—such as Chiruthala plays, Sri Rama Navami celebrations, Ugadi festivals, Bathukamma, Dussehra, Vinayaka Chavithi, and Durga Mata Sharan Navaratri / immersion festivals—have been made accessible to everyone through live streaming on YouTube channels. Around 16 young individuals from this village are actively succeeding on YouTube. This village has emerged as a hub for folk cultural programs and filming. Some key scenes from the films Balagam and Prema Vimanam were shot here. In addition, the filming of more than 50 folk songs was carried out in this area. Notably, about 60% of the scenes of the YouTube-viral song Ranu Bombayki Ranu were filmed in this Village.

== Culture ==
Telugu (with Telangana dialect) is widely spoken by majority in the village. Hindi is also widely used in the village. Traditional dresses like Sari, Dhoti and modern dressing are worn. Every year devotees (some villagers) have to wear Hanuman mala for 41 days. It is the Mandala Deeksha of 41 days. Some devotees also wear ‘Ardha Mandala Deeksha’ (21 days) and ‘Ekadasha Deeksha’ (11 days). Venugopala swamy rathyatra and Hanumana Shobhayathra festival is celebrated grandly during May or June month of every year. Vinayaka Navaratri and Durgamatha Navaratri is also celebrated by the villagers of Kanagarthi. Bathukamma and Bonalu festivals are celebrated in the village. Pochamma Bonaalu is celebrated by the villagers of Kanagarthi once in every five years

== Economic activities ==
Agriculture is the major source of income. Many people are working in semi-skilled sectors in Hyderabad, Mumbai and Middle East countries. There is a good share of government jobs from the village. Many people are working in IT industry in Hyderabad, Bangalore and Chennai. Nearly 2000 people have registered in Upadi Hami Pathakam under Mahatma Gandhi National Rural Employment Guarantee Act. Two subsidy shops of Public Distribution System are operating in the village. Mini dairy is operating in the village from which 250 litres of milk is produced every day.

== Agriculture ==
Most of the people living in the village are farmers. Rice is the major crop cultivated in the village. A variety of crops are grown, including rice, cotton, corn, turmeric, vegetables, moong dal and groundnuts. Rice, corn, cotton are the major crops. The water resources for cultivation are water wells, borewells and ponds.

== Transport ==
The village is located 16 km from Sircilla. The nearest Towns to the Village are Sircilla by 16 km, Vemulawada by 12 km, Karimnagar by 55 km and Siddipet by 50 km. For every 2 Hours, TSRTC Bus from Sircilla to through the Village.
