= B. B. Bhattacharya =

Indian economist (1945–2017)

B B Bhattacharya
- Born: Barid Baran Bhattacharyya; 9 March 1945; Silchar, Assam
- Died: 14 February 2017 (aged 71); Dwarka, India
- Education: (B.Com) (M.A.) University of Allahabad (PhD) Delhi School of Economics; Delhi University (Postdoctoral researcher) University of California Berkeley
- Occupations: Economist, Professor

Barid Baran Bhattacharya (9 March 1945 – 14 February 2017) was an Indian economist and educationist. He was vice-chancellor of Jawaharlal Nehru University. He was also Director and Professor at the Institute of Economic Growth, Delhi.

== Early life and background ==
Bhattacharya was born in Silchar, Assam on 9 March 1945. His father was a civil engineer who belonged to the very first batch of Jadavpur Engineering College. His mother was a homemaker. He spent his childhood growing up in Silchar, where he completed his high school from the then Narsing High School, Silchar, Assam securing 1st Division marks in 1959 and other places across India as his father had a transferable job.

== Education and career ==
Bhattacharya passed B.Com and M.A., in Economics from the University of Allahabad with first position in the order of Merit and obtained Ph.D. in Economics from Delhi School of Economics, University of Delhi. He was UNESCO Fellow at Polish Academy of Sciences, Warsaw and Ford Foundation post doctoral fellow at the University of California, Berkeley. He specialized in macro economics, monetary economics, public finance, international finance, development economics and economic modeling. He was one of India's leading experts on economic modeling and forecasting and his forecasts are used by various government agencies and the World Bank, as well as frequently quoted by media. He was also a regular commentator in media on economic issues. He has a deep interest in culture and literature. He has held many important positions in learned societies and institutions. He was President of the Indian Economic Association, the Indian Econometric Society and of the Indian Association of Research on National Income and Wealth. He was the Chief Editor of the Journal of Income and Wealth and Member of the Editorial Boards of many other technical journals in Economics. He has served as chairman and member of many important Committees and Commissions of the various ministries of the Government of India, notably, Human Resource Development, Finance, Agriculture as well as the Reserve Bank of India, Planning Commission, Finance Commission, Central Statistical Organization and University Grants Commission. He was a Member of governing bodies and executive councils of many reputed universities and research institutes in India. He was the Member of the Supervisory Board of Foundation for Innovation Politique in Paris. He was also an Economics faculty member at Indian Institute of Management, Lucknow.

== Awards and honors ==
He has received many awards and honors in India and abroad. They include Government of France's award of Order de Palms Academie, Bank of Baroda's Sun-Lifetime Achievement Award, Amity Life Time Academic Achievement Award, Ambassador of Peace by Universal Peace Foundation, Kalidas Samman by Oriental Heritage Society of India, World Management Congress Lifetime Achievement Award, etc. Recently he has been nominated for Mother Teresa Lifetime Achievement Award. He has also been honored by Governments of Romania, Mongolia and Poland.

== Works ==
=== Books ===
- Macroeconomic Reforms, Growth and Stability, Oxford University Press, Delhi (with Dr.Sabyasachi Kar), 2006
- Mid-Year Review of the Indian Economy 2001-02, India International Centre, New Delhi and Sipra Publications, New Delhi, 2001 (with N.R.Bhanumurthy).
- Mid-Year Review of the Indian Economy 2000-01, India International Centre, New Delhi and Sipra Publications, New Delhi, 2001.
- Financial Reform and Financial Development in India, Excel Books, Delhi, 1998.
- Stabilisation Policy Options for India: A Macro-Econometric Analysis, Development Research Group Monograph, RBI, Bombay, 1994 (with R.B. Burman and A.K. Nag).
- India’s Economic Crisis, Debt Burden and Stabilisation, B.R. Publishing Corporation, Delhi, 1992.
- Public Expenditure, Inflation and Growth: A Macro-Econometric Analysis for India, Oxford University Press, Delhi, 1984.
- Short-Term Income Determination, Macmillan, Delhi, 1975.

=== Books edited ===
- Studies in Macroeconomics and Welfare, Academic Foundation, New Delhi, 2005 (eds. jointly with Arup Mitra)
- Indian Economy and Society in the Era of Globalisation and Liberalisation: Essays in honour of Prof. A.M. Khusro, Academic Foundation, New Delhi, 2004 (eds. jointly with C. H. Hanumantha Rao and N.S. Siddharthan)
