= Ashok Gulati =

Indian economist

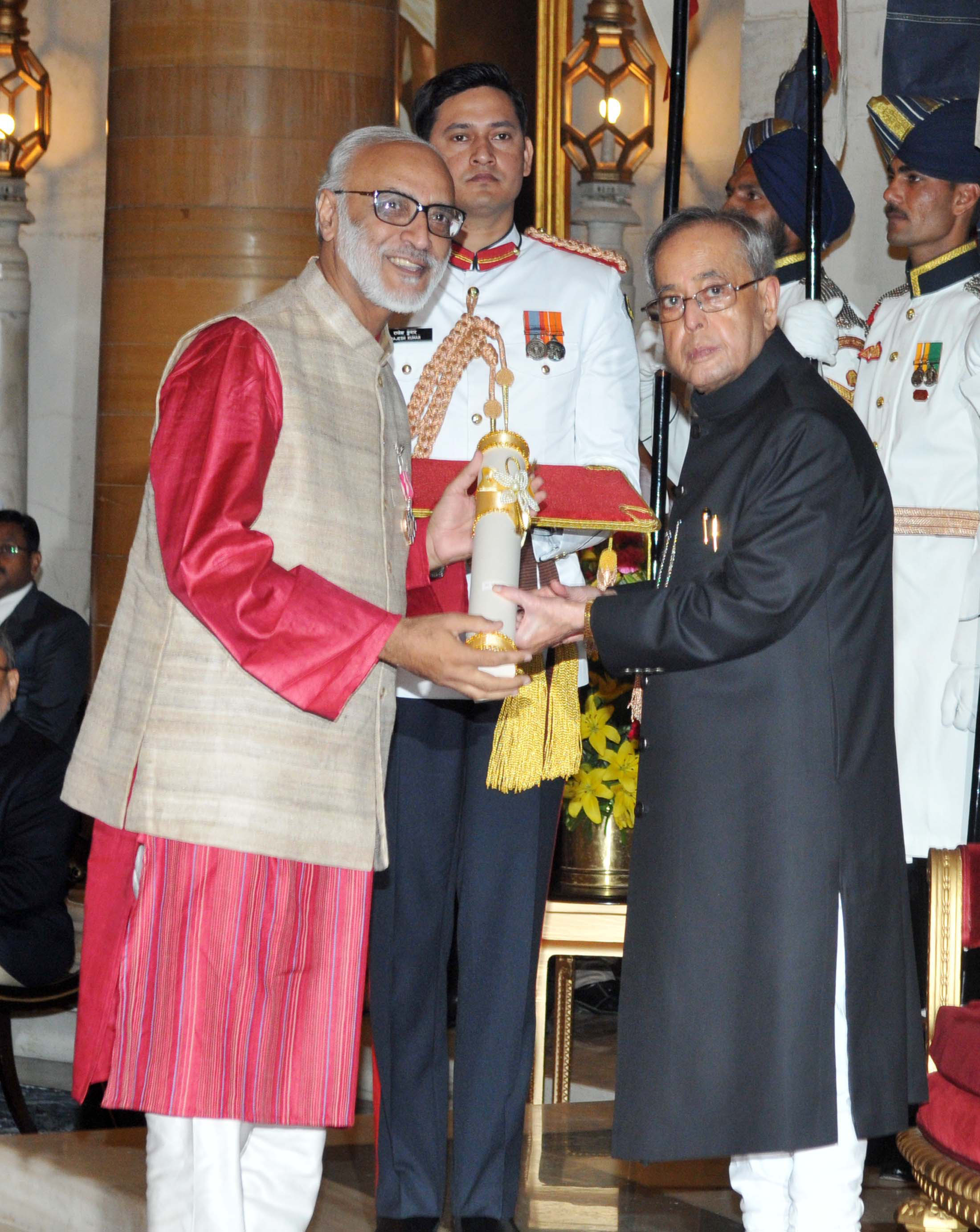
- The President, Shri Pranab Mukherjee presenting the Padma Shri Award to Prof. Ashok Gulati, at a Civil Investiture Ceremony, at Rashtrapati Bhavan, in New Delhi on 30 March 2015
- Born: 11 May 1954 (age 72); Delhi, India
- Education: Shri Ram College of Commerce; Delhi University (BA, MA, PhD)
- Occupation: Agricultural economist
- Known for: Indian agricultural policy issues
- Spouse: Dr. Chandrika Gulati
- Awards: Padma Shri

Ashok Gulati (born 11 May 1954) is an Indian agricultural economist and a former chairman of the Commission for Agricultural Costs and Prices (CACP), the advisory body of the Government of India on food supplies and pricing policies. Gulati was instrumental in the hiking the minimum support price of several food grains. Currently he is Infosys chair professor for Agriculture at Indian Council for Research on International Economic Relations (ICRIER). He is also a member of the Task Force on Agriculture set by the prime minister under NITI Aayog and chairman of the Expert Group on Agriculture Market Reforms (2015). He was an active member of the high-level committee set up by the NDA Government to restructure and reorient Food Corporation of India in order to improve its operational and financial efficiency.

== Early life and education ==
Ashok Gulati graduated from Shri Ram College of Commerce and did his master's degree in economics and PhD from Delhi School of Economics.

== Career ==
As chairman of the Commission for Agricultural Costs and Prices (CACP), Ashok Gulati was assigned with a responsibility to advise Government of India on pricing policies of 23 agri- commodities. His work tenure at CACP is reported to have been transparent with real-time research and policy guidance on agricultural sector of the country. He has written 17 Price Policy Reports for Government of India during his tenure at CACP. He was director at the International Food Policy Research Institute (IFPRI) for more than 10 years. During his stint at IFPRI (January 2001 – February 2011), he garnered expansive worldwide exposure, undertaking and guiding research in Asia, Africa and Latin America (about 35 countries). He worked as a Chair Professor NABARD at Institute of Economic Growth. Prior to that he was Director/Chief Economist, Agriculture and Rural Development at National Council of Applied Economic Research (NCAER) from 1991 till 1997.

Gulati has served in both academic and policy advising capacities in India. He has 13 books and several book chapters to his credit. His book "The Dragon and the Elephant" (co-edited with Shenggan Fan), was published by both Johns Hopkins University Press and Oxford University Press and it has also been translated in Chinese language. Apart from this he has written numerous national and International Journal and media articles.

He was the youngest member of the Prime Minister's Economic Advisory Council of Mr. Atal Bihari Vajpayee, member of the Economic Advisory Council of the Chief Minister and of Andhra Pradesh and member of the State Planning Board of Karnataka. He has also been a member of the board of directors of ICICI Banking Corporation and member of the board of directors of Agricultural Finance Corporation.

He was honoured by the Government of India in 2015 with the Padma Shri, the fourth highest Indian civilian award.

== Bibliography ==
- Liberalizing food grains markets, by Kumar.G, Roy.D, Gulati.A (2010), Oxford University Press, New York.
- From Parastatals to Private Trade: Lessons from Asian Agriculture (eds.) Shahidur Rashid, Ashok Gulati and Ralph Cummings Jr. The Johns Hopkins University Press, USA (2008); also published by Oxford University Press, India (2008).
- Maize in Asia (eds.) Ashok Gulati and John Dixon. Academic Foundation, India (2008)
- WTO Negotiations on Agriculture and Developing Countries by Anwarul Hoda and Ashok Gulati. The Johns Hopkins University Press, USA (2007); also published by Oxford University Press, India (2008)
- The Dragon and the Elephant: Rural Development and Agricultural Reform Experiences in China and India (eds.) Ashok Gulati and Shenggen Fan. The Johns Hopkins University Press, USA (2007); also published by Oxford University Press, India (2008); also published in Chinese by Science Press (2009).
- Agriculture Diversification and Smallholders in South Asia (eds.) P.K. Joshi, Ashok Gulati and Ralph Cummings Jr., Academic Foundation, India (2007).
- Economic Reforms and Food Security: The Impact of Trade and Technology in South Asia (eds.) Suresh Babu and Ashok Gulati. Haworth Press, Inc, New York (2005).
- Institutional Reforms in Indian Irrigation by Ashok Gulati, Ruth Meinzen-Dick and K. V. Raju), SAGE Publications, India (2005).
- Subsidy Syndrome in Indian Agriculture by Ashok Gulati and Sudha Narayanan. Oxford University Press, India (2003).
- Trade Liberalisation and Indian Agriculture by Ashok Gulati and Tim Kelley. Oxford University Press (1999).
- Strategic Change in Indian Irrigation, (eds.) Mark Svendsen and Ashok Gulati. Macmillan India Ltd, (1995).
- Export Competitiveness of Selected Agricultural Commodities by Gulati.A, Sharma.A, Sharma.K, Das.S, Chhabra.V, NCAER, New Delhi (1994).
- Agricultural Price Policy in India: An Econometric Approach by Ashok Gulati. South Asia Books, India (1987).
