= C. H. Hanumantha Rao =

Indian economist and statistician

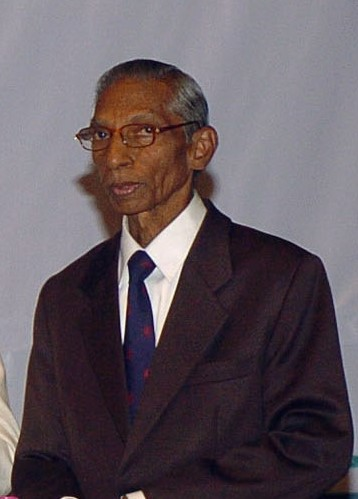
- Chennamaneni in 2009
- Born: 15 May 1929 (age 97); Sircilla, Hyderabad State (now in Telangana, India)
- Occupation: Economist
- Relatives: Chennamaneni Rajeshwara Rao (brother); C. Vidyasagar Rao (brother); Chennamaneni Ramesh (nephew)
- Honours: Padma Bhushan (2004)

Academic background
- Education: (B.A.) Nizam College (M.A.) Osmania University (Ph.D.)Delhi School of Economics; Delhi University (Postdoctoral researcher) The University of Chicago
- Doctoral advisor: Vikas Mishra

Chennamaneni Hanumantha Rao (born 15 May 1929) is an Indian economist and statistician. He was a member of the National Advisory Council from 2004 to 2008 and chaired the Technical Committee on Drought prone Areas Programme and Desert Development Programme of the Commission for Agricultural Costs and Prices. He was awarded the Padma Bhushan by the president of India in 2004, for contributions in the field of Literature and Education.

== Early life ==
Rao was born in Sircilla of present-day Telangana, India. He completed his B.A in 1955 at Nizam College, Hyderabad, M.A.(Economics) in 1957 at Osmania University, Hyderabad and his PhD (Economics) in 1962 at the University of Delhi; He was also Post-Doctoral Fellow at the Department of Economics, University of Chicago, 1966–67.

== Career ==
Rao is the Chairman of the Centre for Economic and Social Studies, Hyderabad. He remained a member of the Seventh and Eighth Planning Commission and also the Finance Commission of India. On receiving the Padma Bhushan from the president of India in 2004 he said in his felicitation speech: "I learnt precision in writing from Professor Dr Vikas Mishra (economist) who was my supervisor for Ph.D thesis. Prof. Mishra used to say, 'one should always ask whether the sentence that one has written is really necessary'. After reading the first draft of my thesis, he suggested deletion of a number of passages by putting round brackets indicating the portions to be deleted. On one occasion he picked up from his shelf an old draft of his own thesis and showed me the similar round brackets placed by his supervisor, Arthur Lewis who was later to be awarded the Nobel Prize in Economics."

== Bibliography ==
- Economic Reforms and Poverty Alleviation in India.
- Regional Disparities, Smaller States and Statehood For Telangana
- Indian Economy and Society in the Era of Globalisation and Liberalisation: Essays in honour of Prof. A.M. Khusro, Academic Foundation, New Delhi, 2004 (eds. jointly with B. B. Bhattacharya and N.S. Siddharthan)
