= Kanagarthi, Peddapalli district =

Village in Telangana, India

Kanagarthi is a village in Peddapalli mandal, Peddapalli district, Telangana, India. The population was 2,427 at the 2011 Indian census.
