= Kanagarthi, Karimnagar district =

Kanagarthi is a village in Jammikunta mandal, Karimnagar district, Telangana, India. The population was 2,539 at the 2011 Indian census.
