= Doubling farmers' income =

Government of India target to be achieved by 2022

Doubling farmers' income (DFI) is a target set by the government of India in February 2016 to be achieved by 2022. The DFI Committee submitted hundreds of recommendations to this effect in September 2018 and is empowered to oversee their implementation.

== Background ==
China doubled farmer income in six years between 1978 and 1984. In the same time it reduced poverty by 50%. With respect to cutting poverty in half, India took three times the number of years—18 years between 1993 and 2011. In 2013, average farmer income was ₹6,426 (equivalent to ₹11,000 or US$110 in 2023) while its average monthly consumption expenditure was ₹6,223 (equivalent to ₹11,000 or US$110 in 2023). Farmer income varies widely between state, land holdings, and commodity.

Prime Minister Narendra Modi first talked of the target of doubling farmers' income at a farmer's rally in Uttar Pradesh on 28 February 2016. The next day Finance Minister Arun Jaitley stated in his budget speech "We are grateful to our farmers for being the backbone of the country's food security. We need to think beyond food security and give back to our farmers a sense of income security. Government will, therefore, reorient its interventions in the farm and non-farm sectors to double the income of the farmers by 2022".

Immediately following the Prime Minister's and Finance Minister's announcement, there were those who felt that the doubling was possible, such as M. S. Swaminathan. On the other hand there were a number of experts who said it could not be done; this included Ashok Gulati and Ashok Desai.

In March 2026, Union minister Shivraj Singh Chouhan claimed that farmers' income had doubled.

== DFI Committee ==
On 13 April 2016, a Doubling Farmers’ Income (DFI) Committee was set up under Ashok Dalwai, who was at that time an additional secretary in the union ministry of agriculture. The report has hundreds of recommendations. Dalwai stated in October 2019 that DFI strategy will be based on increasing productivity, rational resource use and ensuring farmer's to remunerative prices. The Committee has been empowered to implement its recommendations.
