= Konaraopeta mandal =

Coordinates: 18°28′35″N 78°44′08″E

Konaraopeta
- Mandal
- Interactive map of Konaraopeta
- Country: India
- State: Telangana
- District: Rajanna Sircilla
- Talukas: Konaraopeta

Area
  - Total: 188.51 km^{2} (72.78 sq mi)

Population (2011)
  - Total: 40,857
  - Density: 216.74/km^{2} (561.34/sq mi)

Languages
  - Official: Telugu
- Time zone: UTC+5:30 (IST)

Konaraopeta is a mandal in Rajanna Sircilla district in the state of Telangana in India with a population of 40,857. The mandal has 19 inhabited villages with the largest being Konaraopeta.

== Demographics ==
=== Language ===
Languages (2011)
1. Telugu (92.6%)
2. Lambadi (4.10%)
3. Urdu (2.70%)
4. Yerukala (0.30%)
5. Others (0.20%)

There are 37,836(92.6%) Telugu speakers, 1,683(4.1%) Lambadi speakers, 120(0.3%) Yerukala speakers, 1,121(2.7%) Urdu speakers and, 97(0.2%) speaking other languages according to the 2011 census of India

=== Religion ===
Religion in Konaraopet(2011)
1. Hinduism (94.5%)
2. Islam (2.90%)
3. Christianity (2.50%)
4. Other (0.10%)

According to the 2011 census, Hindus form 94.5% of the Mandal's population. Muslims form 2.9% and Christians form 2.5%

== Villages ==
List of Villages in The Mandal:

Village	Population (2011)
Konaraopeta	4,491
Marrimadla	1,587
Vattimalla	2,901
Nimmapalle	3,985
Kondapuram (PR)	1,193
Bausaipeta	2,462
Mamidipalle	2,508
Venkatraopeta	1,169
Sivangalapalle	798
Nizamabad Village	3,454
Kanagarthi	2,300
Pallimaktha	1,238
Suddala	2,896
Ramannapet	858
Dharmaram	2,399
Marthanpet	1,247
Kolanur	2,509
Malkapet	1,788
Nagaram	1,074
