= Commission for Agricultural Costs and Prices =

Advisory body under Government of India

Agency overview
- Formed: January 1, 1965; 61 years ago
- Preceding agency: Department of Scientific Research
- Type: Advisory body
- Jurisdiction: India
- Headquarters: Delhi
- Employees: Classified
- Agency executive: Vijay Paul Sharma, Chairperson
- Parent department: Ministry of Agriculture & Farmers Welfare
- Website: https://cacp.da.gov.in

The Commission for Agricultural Costs and Prices (CACP) is an attached office under the Ministry of Agriculture & Farmers Welfare, Government of India, that recommends Minimum Support Prices (MSPs) for select crops. It was established in 1965 as the Agricultural Prices Commission, and was given its present name in 1985.

== Mission ==
The commission was established to recommend Minimum Support Prices (MSPs), to motivate cultivators and farmers to adopt the latest technology in order to optimise the use of resources and increase productivity.

== Composition ==
Currently, the Commission consists of -

- a Chairman
- Member Secretary
- one Member (Official)
- two Members (Non-Official)

The non-official members are representatives of the farming community and usually have an active association with the farming community.

== Recommendations ==
As of now, CACP recommends MSPs of 22 commodities:

- 7 cereals: paddy, wheat, maize, sorghum, pearl millet, barley and ragi,
- 5 pulses: gram, tur, moong, urad, lentil,
- 7 oilseeds: groundnut, rapeseed-mustard, soyabean, sesamum, sunflower, safflower, niger seed and
- 3 commercial crops: copra, cotton and raw jute (sugarcane - Fair and remunerative Price )
