= C. Vidyasagar Rao =

Indian politician

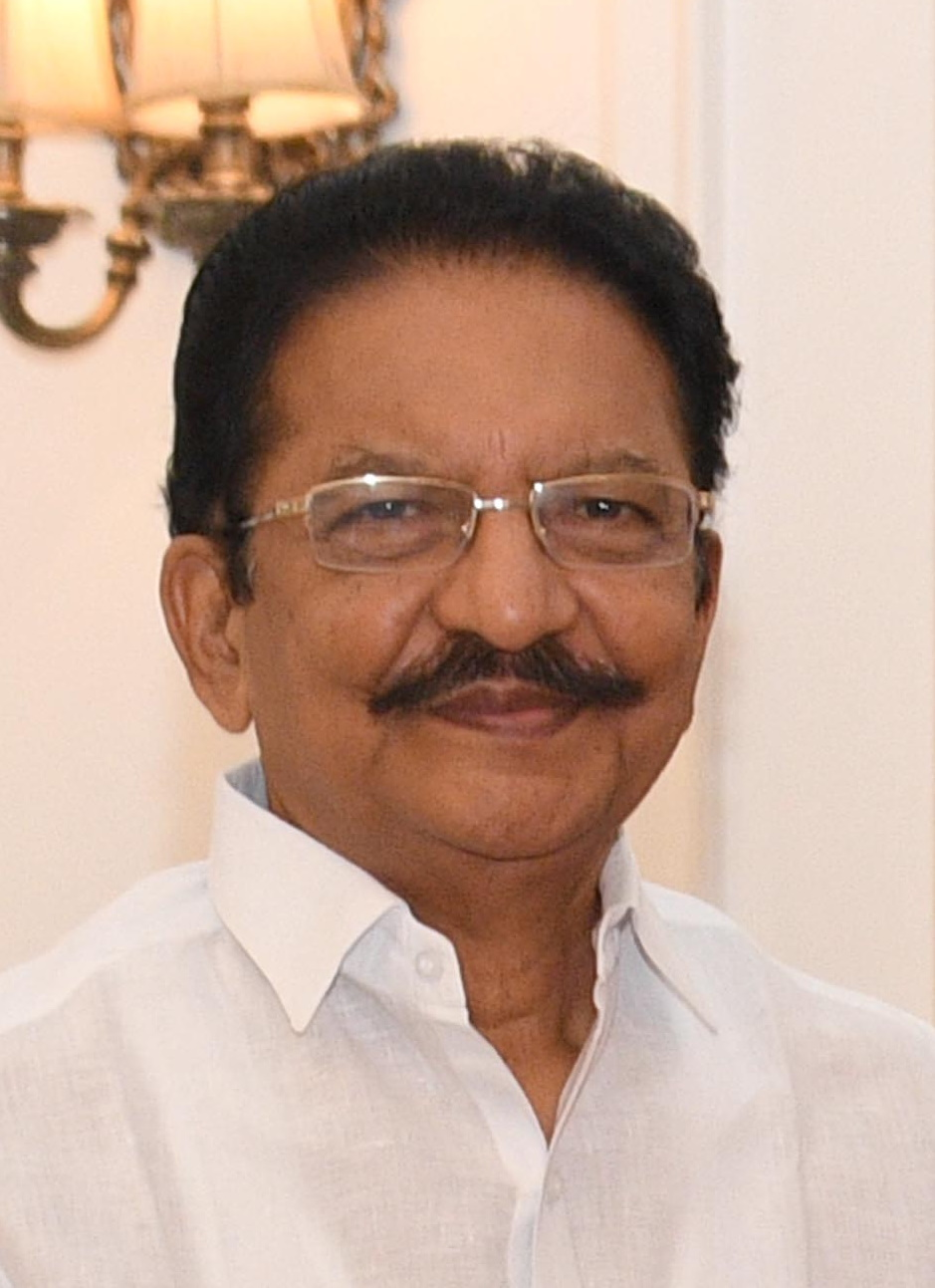
- Rao in 2024

21st Governor of Maharashtra
- In office 30 August 2014 – 4 September 2019
- Chief Ministers: Prithviraj Chavan (until 2014); Devendra Fadnavis (2014 - 2019)
- Deputy CM: Ajit Pawar (until 2014)
- Preceded by: Om Prakash Kohli (additional charge)
- Succeeded by: B. S. Koshyari

Governor of Tamil Nadu
- (Additional Charge)
- In office 2 September 2016 – 6 October 2017
- Chief Minister: J. Jayalalithaa; O. Panneerselvam; Edappadi K. Palaniswami
- Deputy Chief Minister: O. Panneerselvam
- Preceded by: K. Rosaiah
- Succeeded by: Banwarilal Purohit

Minister of state in the Ministry of Commerce and Industry
- In office 29 January 2003 – 22 May 2004
- Prime Minister: Atal Bihari Vajpayee
- Preceded by: Sukhbir Singh Badal
- Succeeded by: Jairam Ramesh

Minister of State in the Ministry of Home Affairs
- In office 13 October 1999 – 29 January 2003
- Prime Minister: Atal Bihari Vajpayee
- Minister: L. K. Advani
- Succeeded by: Shakeel Ahmad

Member of the Indian Parliament for Karimnagar
- In office 28 February 1998 – 16 May 2004
- Preceded by: L. Ramana
- Succeeded by: Kalvakuntla Chandrashekar Rao

Member of the Andhra Pradesh Legislative Assembly for Metpally
- In office 1985-1998

Personal details
- Born: Chennamaneni Vidyasagar Rao; 12 February 1941 (age 85) Nagaram, Hyderabad State, British India (now in Telangana, India)
- Party: Bharatiya Janata Party
- Spouse: Vinoda Rao
- Relatives: Chennamaneni Rajeshwara Rao (brother); C. H. Hanumantha Rao (brother)

Chennamaneni Vidyasagar Rao (born 12 February 1941) is an Indian politician from Telangana, associated with Bharatiya Janata Party. He served as Governor of Maharashtra from 2014 to 2019. As a member of the Bharatiya Janata Party, he had served as a Union Minister of State in the Ministry of Home Affairs in Atal Bihari Vajpayee's government from 1999. He was elected to the Lok Sabha in 1998 and 1999 (13th Lok Sabha) from Karimnagar (Lok Sabha constituency).

== Early life ==
He was born in Nagaram, Sircilla district on 12 February 1941 to C. Srinivasa Rao and Chandramma. He has three brothers. He completed his schooling in Vemulawada, PUC in Hyderabad, B.Sc. in Nanded of Maharashtra and later studied law at Osmania University.

== Legal and political career ==
=== As a lawyer and politician ===
After completion of law, he started working as lawyer. He was elected as convener (Chairman) of Janasangh, Karimnagar in 1972. He went to jail during the emergency period. He represented the BJP in Andhra Pradesh Legislative Assembly from Metpally assembly segment from 1985 to 1998 and entered into the Parliament by winning Karimnagar Lok Sabha constituency in 1998 and in 1999. He was also the BJP state president in 1998. His leadership in assembly has lifted party's profile in the state. Shri Rao had been Floor Leader of his party in the Andhra Pradesh Legislative Assembly for 15 years. He was successful in piloting a private member’s bill in the Andhra Pradesh Legislative Assembly that sought stringent punishment for people practicing bigamy. His Padyatra to Ichampalli in the year 1998 as the then BJP president highlighting the need to utilize Godavari waters for the needs of the people of Telangana led the Government to consider the project seriously.

=== As a minister ===
He was Union minister of State for Home affairs in the cabinet of Atal Behari Vajpayee in 1999. Later, his portfolio was changed to Union Minister of state for Commerce and Industry.

=== As a governor ===
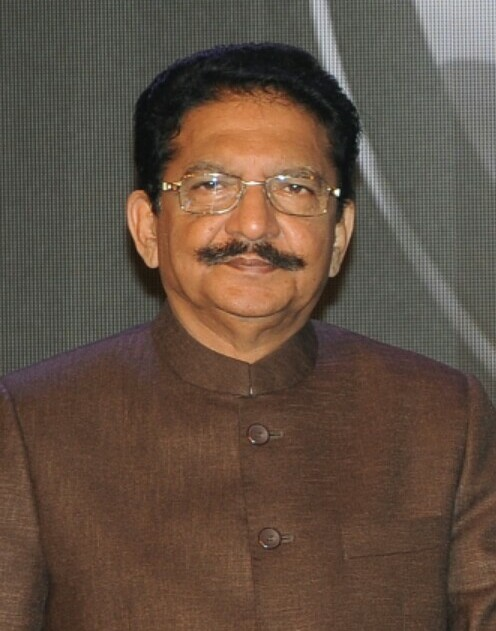
C. Vidyasagar Rao, as the Governor of Maharashtra while the Vice President, Shri M. Venkaiah Naidu was giving away Mint’s Corporate Strategy Awards, in Mumbai on March 23, 2018.

He was appointed a governor of Maharashtra on 30 August 2014. His appointment was issued by 13th President of India, Mr.Pranab Mukherjee after the resignation of K. Sankaranarayanan. His oath was administered by Chief Justice of Bombay High Court Mohit Shah. On 26 September 2014, he accepted the resignation of Prithviraj Chavan as his party had no majority, and President's Rule was imposed on Maharashtra.

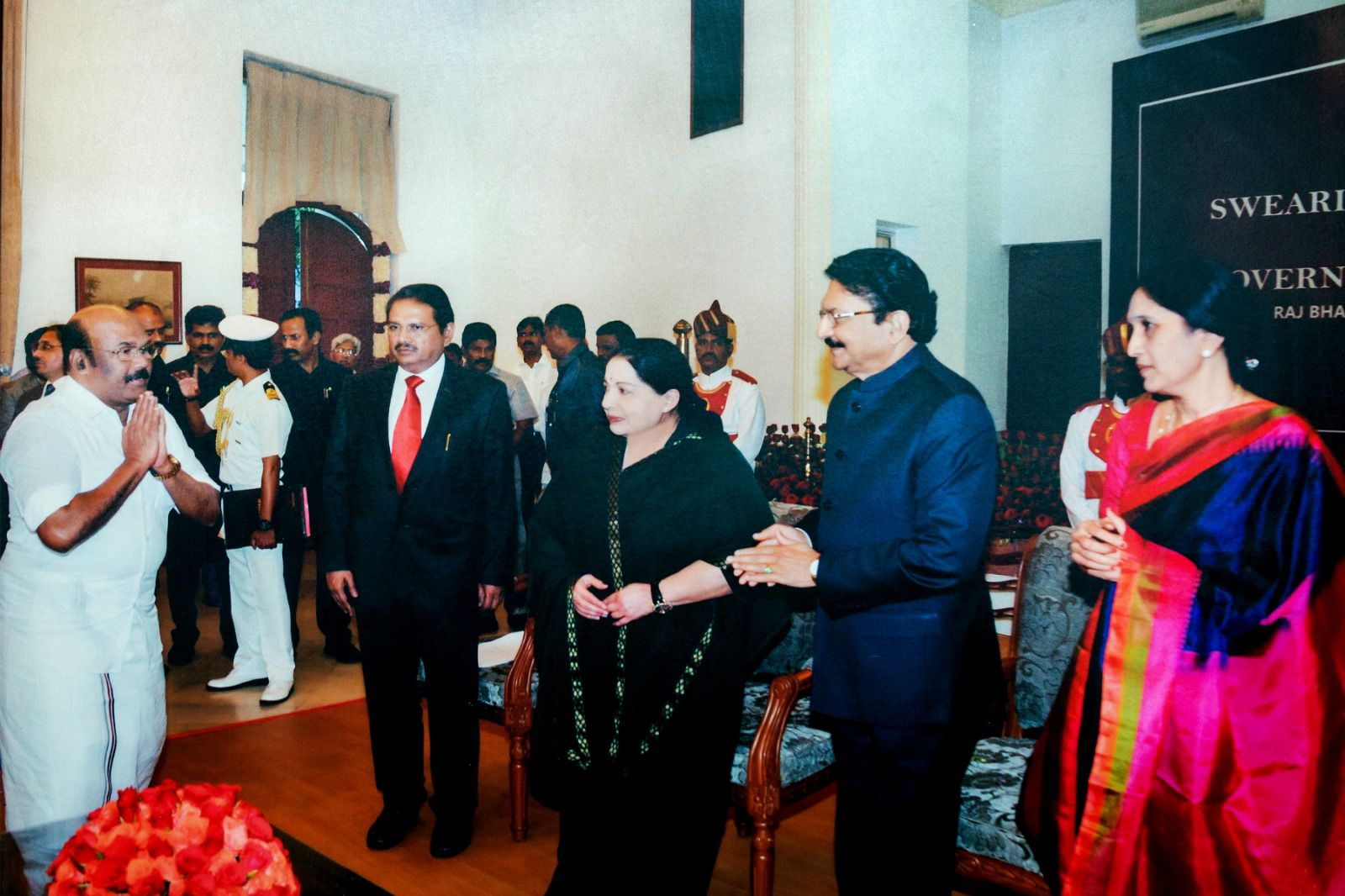
C. Vidyasagar Rao at his swearing-in ceremony as the additional charge-Governor of Tamil Nadu in September 2016

He held additional charge as governor of Tamil Nadu from 2 September 2016 to 6 October 2017.

== Electoral History ==
=== Lok Sabha ===
| Year | Constituency | Party | Votes | % | Opponent | Party | Votes | % | Result | Margin | % |
|---|---|---|---|---|---|---|---|---|---|---|---|
| 1980 | Karimnagar | JP | 45,449 | 12.64 | M. Satyanarayana Rao | INC(I) | 201,777 | 56.12 | Lost | −156,328 | −43.48 |
| 1998 | Karimnagar | BJP | 329,030 | 42.83 | Lgandula Ramana | TDP | 233,033 | 30.33 | Won | +95,997 | +12.50 |
| 1999 | Karimnagar | BJP | 398,437 | 49.73 | Anand Rao Chelimeda | INC | 379,067 | 47.31 | Won | +19,370 | +2.42 |
| 2004 | Karimnagar | BJP | 320,031 | 36.60 | K. Chandra Shakher Rao | TRS | 451,199 | 51.60 | Lost | −131,168 | −15.00 |
| 2014 | Karimnagar | BJP | 214,828 | 19.06 | Vinod Kumar Boinapally | TRS | 505,358 | 44.83 | Lost | −290,530 | −25.77 |

== Personal life ==
His wife's name is Vinoda. His elder brothers are C. Rajeshwara Rao, a former Communist leader, C. Hanumantha Rao who was the chancellor of Hyderabad Central University and C. Venkateshwara Rao.

Lok Sabha
| Preceded by L. Ramana | Member of Parliament for Karimnagar; 1998 – 2004 | Succeeded by K. Chandrashekhar Rao |
Political offices
| Preceded by Kateekal Sankaranarayanan | Governor of Maharashtra; 30 August 2014 – 4 September 2019 | Succeeded by Bhagat Singh Koshyari |
| Preceded by Konijeti Rosaiah | Governor of Tamil Nadu; 2 September 2016 – 6 October 2017 | Succeeded by Banwarilal Purohit |
