= Jalagam =

Jalagam (Telugu: జలగం) is a Telugu surname:.

- Jalagam Kondala Rao, former Parliament member from Khammam (Lok Sabha constituency)
- Jalagam Prasada Rao, former Indian politician
- Jalagam Vengala Rao, former Chief Minister of Andhra Pradesh
- Jalagam Venkat Rao, former member of the Andhra Pradesh legislative assembly.
