= Thummala Nageswara Rao =

Indian politician (born 1953)

Tummala Nageshwara Rao
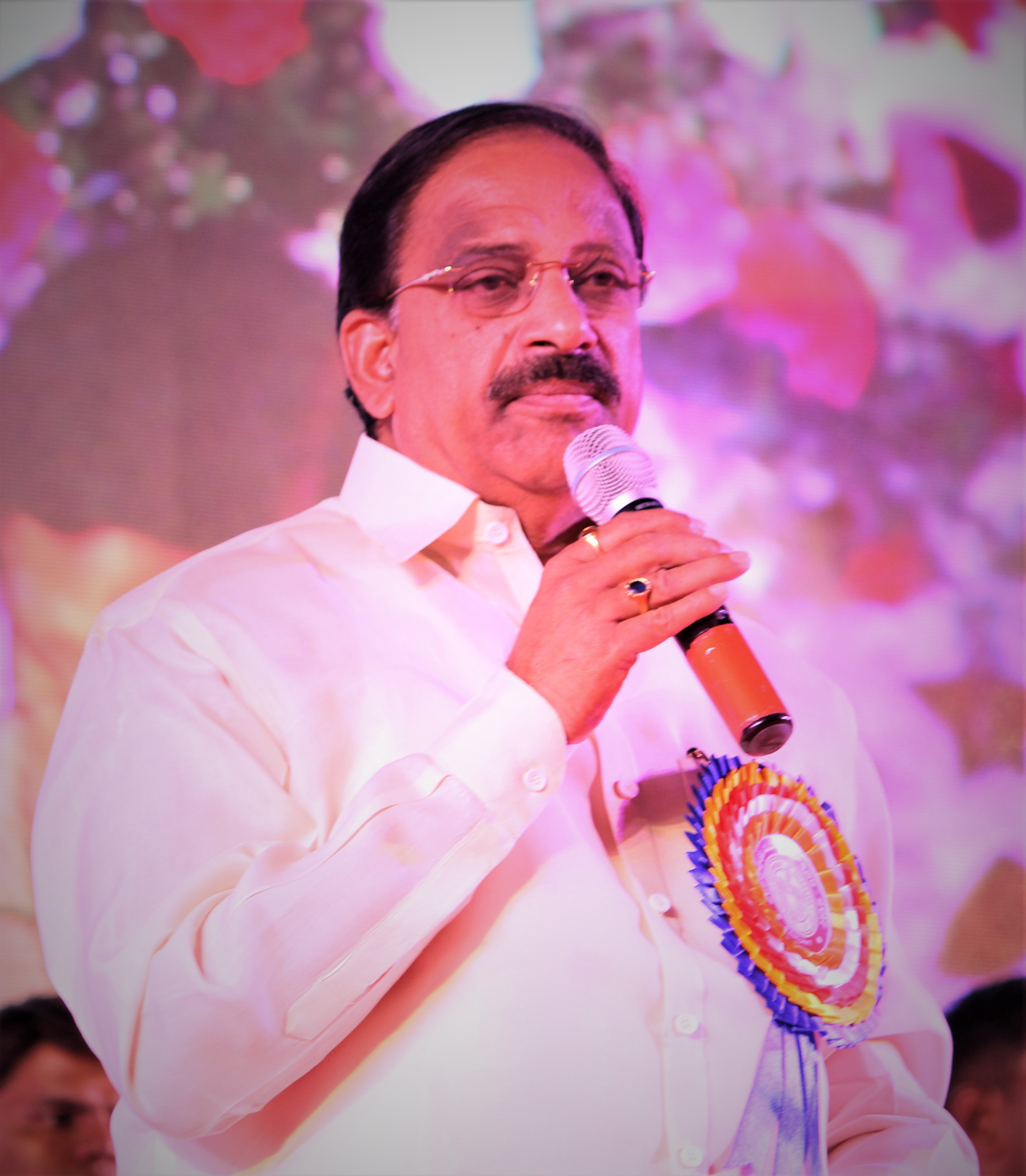

Minister of Agriculture, Cooperation and Textiles Government of Telangana
- Incumbent
- Assumed office 7 December 2023
- Governor: Tamilisai Soundararajan (2023-2024); C. P. Radhakrishnan (2024); Jishnu Dev Varma (2024-2026); Shiv Pratap Shukla ( 2026–present)
- Chief Minister: Revanth Reddy
- Preceded by: Singireddy Niranjan Reddy

Member of Telangana Legislative Assembly
- Incumbent
- Assumed office 3 December 2023
- Preceded by: Puvvada Ajay Kumar
- Constituency: Khammam
- In office 19 May 2016 – 11 December 2018
- Preceded by: Ramireddy Venkatareddy
- Succeeded by: Kandala Upender Reddy
- Constituency: Palair

Minister of Roads and Buildings Government of Telangana
- In office 16 December 2014 – 28 November 2018
- Governor: E. S. L. Narasimhan
- Chief Minister: K. Chandrashekar Rao
- Preceded by: Position Established
- Succeeded by: Vemula Prashanth Reddy

Member of Telangana Legislative Council
- In office 2014–2016
- Chairman: K. Swamy Goud
- Leader of the House: K. Chandrashekar Rao
- Preceded by: Telangana Legislative Council Created

Minister of Major & Minor Irrigation Government of Andhra Pradesh
- In office 1 September 1995 - 13 May 2004
- Governor: Krishan Kant; G. Ramanujam; C. Rangarajan; Surjit Singh Barnala
- Chief Minister: N. Chandrababu Naidu
- Preceded by: Makineni Pedda Rataiah
- Succeeded by: Ponnala Lakshmaiah
- In office 9 March 1985 – 12 December 1989
- Governor: Shankar Dayal Sharma; Kumudben Joshi
- Chief Minister: N. T. Rama Rao
- Preceded by: Srinivasulu Reddy Nallapareddy

Member of Andhra Pradesh Legislative Assembly
- In office 16 May 2009 – 16 May 2014
- Preceded by: Tammineni Veerabhadram
- Succeeded by: Puvvada Ajay Kumar
- Constituency: Khammam
- In office 11 December 1994 – 11 May 2004
- Preceded by: Jalagam Prasada Rao
- Succeeded by: Jalagam Venkat Rao
- Constituency: Sathupalli
- In office 1985–1989
- Preceded by: Jalagam Prasada Rao
- Succeeded by: Jalagam Prasada Rao
- Constituency: Sathupalli

Personal details
- Born: 15 November 1953 (age 72) Gandugulapally, Khammam district, Hyderabad State (present-day Telangana), India
- Party: Indian National Congress (since 2023)
- Other political affiliations: Telangana Rashtra Samiti (2014–2023); Telugu Desam Party (1982–2014)
- Children: 3

Thummala Nageswara Rao is an Indian Congress politician who has been a minister in the Government of Andhra Pradesh and, later, now in the Government of Telangana. Rao is from Khammam district.

== Early life ==
Rao, born on 15 November 1953, is from the village of Gollagudem, Dammapeta mandal, in Khammam district.

== Career ==
Rao joined the Telugu Desam Party (TDP) for the 1982 election, but lost the 1983 election. He was elected three times to the Legislative Assembly of Andhra Pradesh as a TDP candidate from Sathupalli constituency: in 1985, 1994 and 1999.

Although he is from Sathupalli, due to changes in the reservation of seats in constituencies he won the 2009 election from the Khammam constituency. Rao again contested the seat in 2014, losing by about 6,000 votes; that election was for the Telangana Legislative Assembly, due to the bifurcation of Andhra Pradesh.

He joined Bharat Rashtra Samithi (BRS) in September 2014, and was inducted into the cabinet in December as Minister for Roads and Buildings. Rao resigned from the BRS and joined the Indian National Congress in September 2023 after he was denied a BRS ticket for elections. After serving as a member of the Telangana Legislative Council, Rao again gained an assembly seat in May 2016 when he won the Palair constituency in a by-election by a decisive margin as a BRS candidate.

In the 2023 Telangana Legislative Assembly election, he defeated BRS candidate Puvvada Ajay Kumar in the Khammam constituency. Rao took the oath as minister at L. B. Stadium in Hyderabad on 7 December 2024, and was assigned the Agriculture, Marketing, Co-operation, Handlooms and Textiles portfolios two days later in the Revanth Reddy ministry.

=== Work with four chief ministers ===
Rao brought funds to Khammam district and worked for its development. He first became a member of Chief Minister N. T. Rama Rao's cabinet as Minister of Small Irrigation, and was reappointed in 1995. Rao became Minister of Prohibition and Excise in CM Chandrababu Naidu's cabinet on 20 August 1996, and was appointed Union Minister of Heavy and Medium Irrigation on 5 December of that year. Excise Minister in 1999, he was appointed Minister of Roads and Buildings in 2001. Rao became president of the Telugu Desam Party of Khammam district on 15 November 2004.

He joined the Telangana Rashtra Samithi on 5 September 2014, and became Minister of Roads, Buildings and Women and Child Welfare on 16 December of that year. In 2015, Rao was selected as an MLC. In 2016, he was elected as an MLA and continued as a minister.

Khammam projects
Nr.	Department	Number	Cost (crore)
1	R&B	24	₹126.82
		Outer Ring Road	₹209
2	PR	113	₹17
3	Irrigation		
		MK I - 19	₹23
		MKII- 14	₹4
		MKIII- 09	₹2.2
		MTB 01	₹13.5
			₹42.7
4	Water grid		
		R. N. Palem	₹88.5
		Corporation	₹114
		Intra (46)	₹32
			₹234.5
5	Transco	5	₹10
6	IDC	2	₹24
7	EW IDC		
		College building	₹13.5
		ST&SC&BC	₹6.5
			₹20
8	RVM	32	₹2.1
9	Corporation		
		Completed	₹152
		Proposed	₹100
			₹252
10	NSP	1	₹24.75
11	HMIDC		
	Double bedrooms	5,000	₹26.25
Total		5,220	₹979.62

- Bhakta Ramadasu, Sitarama projects, modernization of Paleru Old Canal
- Cultivation and drinking water due to the construction of check dams in Paleru
- Development of a joint Khammam district with construction of national highways and bridges
- Construction of a palm oil factory at Apparao Peta
- Construction of the Betupalli Varada and NTR Canals
- Modernization of Bakaram Pond
- Construction of the Bhadradri Power Plant

== Electoral History ==
=== Legislative Assembly Elections ===
Year	Constituency	Party	Votes	%	Opponent	Party	Votes	%	Result	Margin	%
2023	Khammam	INC	1,36,016	57.58	Puvvada Ajay Kumar	BRS	86,635	36.67	Won	+49,381	+20.91
2018	Palair	TRS	81,738	42.54	Kandala Upender Reddy	INC	89,407	46.53	Lost	-7,669	-3.99
2016 (Note: By-election)	Palair	TRS	94,940	55.50	Sucharitha Ramreddy	INC	49,258	28.80	Won	+45,682	+26.70
2014	Khammam	TDP	64,783	34.85	Puvvada Ajay Kumar	INC	70,465	37.91	Lost	-5,682	-3.06
2009	Khammam	TDP	55,555	36.22	Jalagam Venkat Rao	IND	53,083	34.60	Won	+2,472	+1.62
2004	Sathupalli	TDP	80,450	45.84	Jalagam Venkat Rao	INC	89,986	51.27	Lost	-9,536	-5.43
1999	Sathupalli	TDP	87,717	57.33	Ponguleti Sudhakar Reddy	INC	56,688	37.05	Won	+31,029	+20.28
1994	Sathupalli	TDP	74,049	51.55	Prasada Rao Jalagam	INC	66,455	46.26	Won	+7,594	+5.29
1989	Sathupalli	TDP	54,960	43.59	Jalagam Prasada Rao	INC	61,389	48.69	Lost	-6,429	-5.10
1985	Sathupalli	TDP	49,990	51.21	Lakkeneni Joga Rao	INC	46,172	47.29	Won	+3,818	+3.92
1983	Sathupalli	IND	36,278	44.56	Jalagam Prasada Rao	INC	42,494	52.19	Lost	-6,216	-7.63
