= Sandra Venkata Veeraiah =

Indian politician (born 1968)

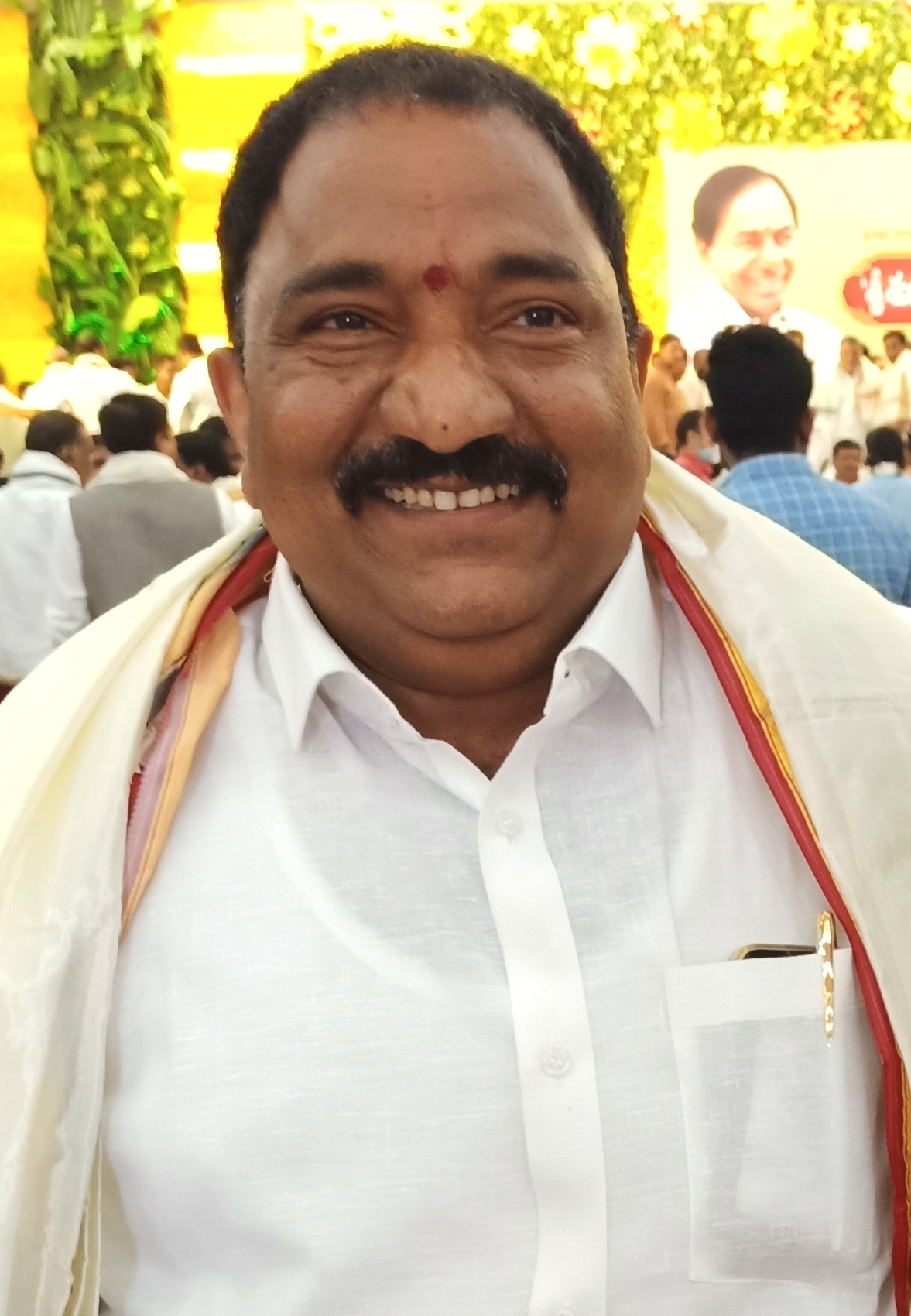

Member of the Telangana Legislative Assembly
- In office 2009–2023
- Preceded by: Jalagam Venkat Rao
- Succeeded by: Matta Ragamayee
- Constituency: Sathupalli

Member of the Telangana Legislative Assembly
- In office 1994–1999
- Preceded by: Sambani Chandra Sheker
- Succeeded by: Chandra Sekhar Sambhani
- Constituency: Palair

Personal details
- Born: 15 August 1968 (age 58) Rajupeta, Kusumanchi Mandal
- Party: Bharat Rashtra Samithi
- Other political affiliations: Telugu Desam Party; Communist Party of India (Marxist)
- Occupation: Politician

Sandra Venkata Veeraiah (born 15 August 1968) is an Indian politician from Telangana. He is the incumbent MLA from Sathupalli in the Telangana Legislative Assembly. He has been elected four times as MLA, once from Communist Party of India (Marxist) representing Palair and thrice from Telugu Desam Party representing Sathupalli. He belongs to the Bharat Rashtra Samithi.

== Early life ==
Venkata Veeraiah, who hails from a poor Dalit family, was elected as an MLA at the age of 25 in 1994.

== Career ==
Venkata Veeraiah was elected as a Member of the Legislative Assembly (MLA) from the Communist Party of India (Marxist) for the Palair constituency in the Andhra Pradesh Legislative Assembly in 1994.

In 1999, he served as the in-charge of the CPM Party for the Palair constituency. In 2004, he took on the role of in-charge for the Telugu Desam Party (TDP) in the Palair constituency.

In 2009, he was elected as an MLA from the TDP for the Sathupalli constituency of the Andhra Pradesh Legislative Assembly. He continued to hold the position in 2014 when the Sathupalli constituency became part of the newly-formed Telangana Legislative Assembly.

He was elected as a member of the Tirumala Tirupati Devasthanams (TTD) Board three times in 2016, 2017, and 2018.

In 2018, he served as the Vice-President of the National TDP. In the same year, he was elected as an MLA from the TDP for the Sathupalli constituency of the Telangana Legislative Assembly. In spite of having differing opinions with the Telangana Rashtra Samithi (TRS) he switched his allegiance and joined the TRS officially in 2021.
