= Park Hyatt Hyderabad =

Hotel in Hyderabad, India

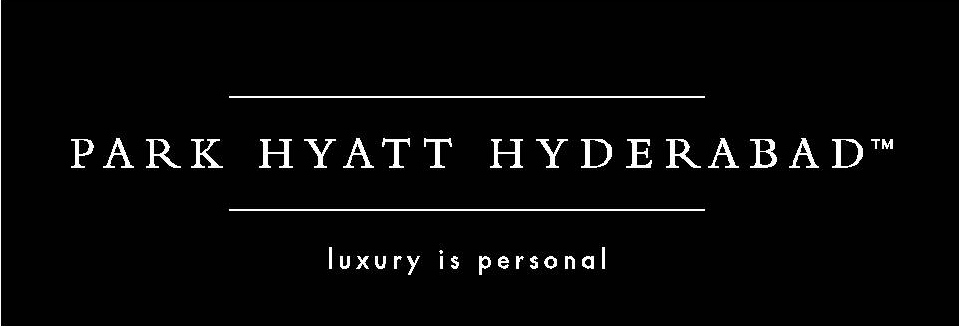

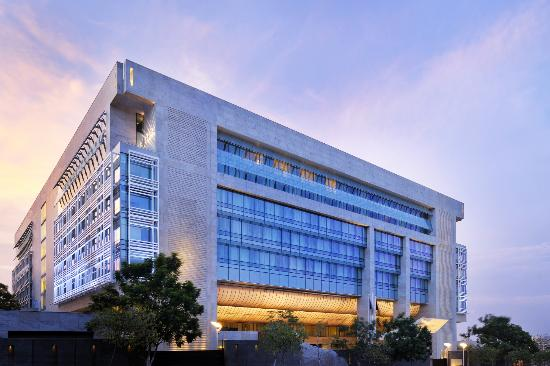
- Park Hyatt Hyderabad

- Location within India
- Hotel chain: Hyatt

General information
- Location: India, Road no 2 , Banjara Hills, Hyderabad, Telangana, India
- Coordinates: 17.4248°N 78.4274°E
- Opening: 29 April 2012; 14 years ago
- Owner: Gayatri-Hi-tech Hotels
- Operator: Hyatt Hotels Corporation

Technical details
- Floor count: 8

Design and construction
- Architect: John Portman & Associates

Other information
- Number of rooms: 185
- Number of suites: 24

Website
- hyderabad.park.hyatt.com

Park Hyatt Hyderabad is a luxury hotel located in the Banjara Hills neighbourhood of Hyderabad, India that opened on 29 April 2012. Built on an area of 32,256 square metres (347,200 sq ft) the Hotel is the first urban Park Hyatt in India and 29th hotel in the Park Hyatt portfolio.

== History ==
Built across on an area of 32,256 square metres (347,200 sq ft) the construction of the hotel started in 2006. Owned by Gayatri Hi-tech Hotels and managed by Hyatt, the hotel was inaugurated on 29 April 2012 costing Rs 7 billion approximately.

== The Hotel ==
The Hotel has 185 rooms, 24 suites on the first six floors and 42 furnished service apartments called The Residence on the top two floors. The residences are pet friendly and guests can stay with their pets. Each of the hotel’s guestrooms are among the largest in Hyderabad, measuring at least 463 square feet. The lobby is designed with sparkling water feature and plants that surround a 35-foot tall white abstract sculpture. Park Hyatt Hyderabad is the first hotel in India to feature Hyatt’s residential-style meeting concept named The Manor. The total meetings and events facilities measure more than 1,600 square metres (17,000 sq ft). Accommodating a range of dining the hotel has a Lobby Lounge - The Living Room, The Dining Room – All Day Dining Restaurant, Tre-Forni Bar & Restaurant - Northern Italian Cuisine, Rika – Asian Cuisine. The Hotel is also equipped with Spa & Fitness Facilities.

== Art collection ==
The Park Hyatt Hyderabad owns a contemporary art collection composed of various international artists’ paintings: B2Fays (29 paintings, including 5 series of 20 meters long), Anuradha Thakur, N Ramachandran, Y Shivaramacharry, David Sequiera, Udaya Chiluveru, Anamika V, Ramana Reddy, Y Shivaramacharry, Ritu Purana Das, Hetal Chudasama, Ashoke Mullick, Jaya Javeri, Kiran Kumar, Ravi, Laxman Aelay, Atul Bhalla, Matthieu Faury, Mohammed Osman, Ramesh V, Chippa Sudhakar, Manohar C, G Anjaneyulu, Devyani Parikh, Laxma Goud.

== Events ==
The Hotel was a venue for events and conferences such as UNWTO, TATA We- connect, Malaysian Trade High commission, HAL parliamentary and interactive art installation "Via presence" by B2Fays. The Hotel is also the official hospitality partner of IPL team Sunrisers Hyderabad.

It is also hosting the Pakistan national cricket team for its initial leg of the 2023 Cricket World Cup.

== Incidents ==
In 14 April 2025, a fire accident at the Park Hyatt hotel, Hyderabad led to the evacuation of guests, including members of the Sunrisers IPL team. The incident was brought under control without any injuries.
