= Sathupalli Assembly constituency =

Constituency of the Telangana legislative assembly in India

Coordinates: 17.211°N 80.832°E

Sathupalli
- Constituency No. 116 for the Telangana Legislative Assembly
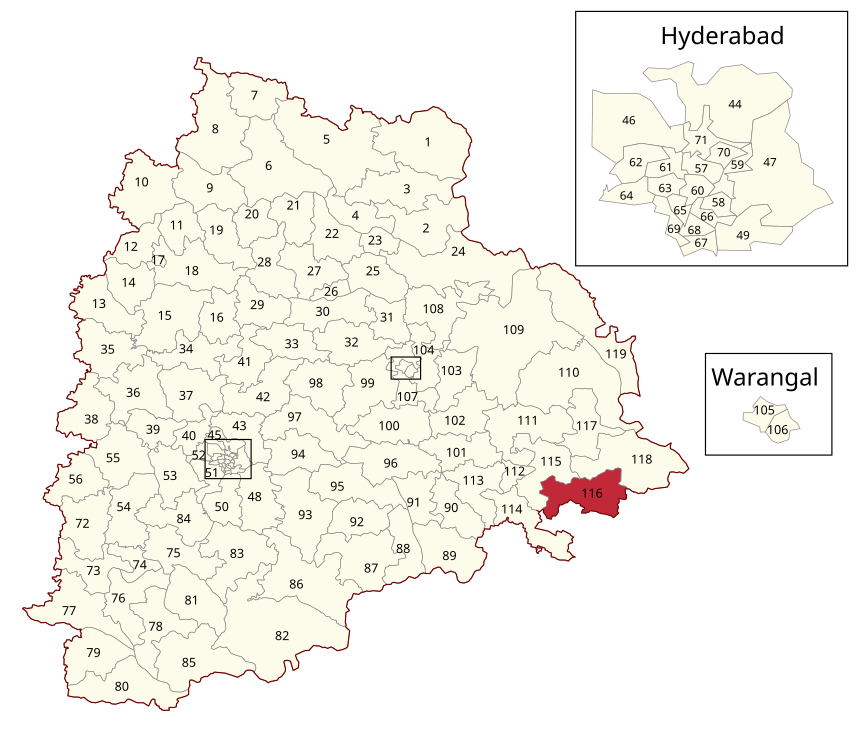
- Location of Sathupalli Assembly constituency within Telangana

Constituency details
- Country: India
- Region: South India
- State: Telangana
- District: Khammam
- Lok Sabha constituency: Khammam
- Established: 1951
- Total electors: 2,17,162
- Reservation: SC

Member of Legislative Assembly
- 3rd Telangana Legislative Assembly
- Incumbent Matta Ragamayee
- Party: Indian National Congress
- Elected year: 2023

Sathupalli Assembly constituency (also spelled as, Sathupalle) is a constituency of Telangana Legislative Assembly, India. It is one of ten constituencies in Khammam district and is a part of Khammam Lok Sabha constituency.

Matta Ragamayee of Indian National Congress is the MLA of the constituency.

== Mandals ==
The Assembly Constituency presently comprises the following Mandals:

Mandal
Sathupalli
Penuballi
Kalluru
Thallada
Vemsoor

== Members of the Legislative Assembly ==
Year	Member	Political party
United Andhra Pradesh
1978	Jalagam Vengala Rao	Indian National Congress
1979★	Jalagam Vengala Rao	Indian National Congress
1983	Jalagam Prasada Rao	Indian National Congress
1985	Thummala Nageswara Rao	Telugu Desam Party
1989	Jalagam Prasada Rao	Indian National Congress
1994	Thummala Nageswara Rao	Telugu Desam Party
1999	Thummala Nageswara Rao	Telugu Desam Party
2004	Jalagam Venkat Rao	Indian National Congress
2009	Sandra Venkata Veeraiah	Telugu Desam Party
Telangana Legislative Assembly
2014	Sandra Venkata Veeraiah	Telugu Desam Party
2018	Sandra Venkata Veeraiah	Telugu Desam Party
2023	Matta Ragamayee	Indian National Congress

★by-election

== Election results ==
Vote share of Winning candidates
2023	51.66%
2018	50.46%
2014	39.68%
2009	46.97%
2004	51.27%
1999	57.33%
1994	51.55%
1989	48.69%
1985	51.21%
1983	52.19%
1979 (by-poll)	61.85%
1978	52.79%

=== 2023 ===
2023 Telangana Legislative Assembly election: Sathupalli
Party	Candidate	Votes	%	±%
INC	Matta Ragamayee	111,245	51.66	
BRS	Sandra Venkata Veeraiah	91,805	42.63	
BJP	Namburi Ramalingeswara Rao	1,882	0.87	
BSP	Seelam Venkateswara Rao	1,415	0.66	
CPI(M)	Bharathi Macharla	1,225	0.57	
NOTA	None of the Above	635	0.29	
IND	10 Independent Candidates	3,986	1.85	
OTH	8 Other Party Candidates	3,156	1.47	
Majority		19,440	9.03	
Turnout				
Swing to INC from TDP		Swing		

=== 2018 ===
2018 Telangana Legislative Assembly election: Sathupalli
Party	Candidate	Votes	%	±%
TDP	Sandra Venkata Veeraiah (Note: TDP candidate was joint candidate from Praja Kutami which was supported by INC, TJS and CPI)	100,044	50.46	
TRS	Pidamarthi Ravi	81,042	40.87	
IND	Kolikapogu Swamy	7,345	3.70	
CPI(M)	Macharla Bharathi	2,673	1.35	
NOTA	None of the Above	1,672	0.84	
BJP	Namburi Ramalingeswara Rao	1,390	0.70	
IND	2 Independent Candidates	1,628	0.82	
OTH	4 Other Party Candidates	2,487	1.25	
Majority		19,002	9.59	
Turnout		198,281	89.00	
TDP hold		Swing		

=== 2014 ===
2014 Andhra Pradesh Legislative Assembly election: Sathupalli (SC)
Party	Candidate	Votes	%	±%
TDP	Sandra Venkata Veeraiah	75,490	39.68	
YSRCP	Matta Dayanand Vijay Kumar	73,005	38.37	
INC	Chandra Sekhar Sambhani	30,105	15.82	
TRS	Pidamarthy Ravi	6,666	3.50	
IND	Amarlapudi Ramu	1,361	0.72	
PPOI	Kotaiah Rentapally	1,070	0.56	
IND	Akkirala Venkateswarlu	979	0.51	
NOTA	None of the Above	905	0.48	
BSP	Damalla Satyanarayana	684	0.36	
Majority		2,485	1.31	
Turnout		190,265	85.81	
TDP hold		Swing		

=== 2009 ===
2009 Andhra Pradesh Legislative Assembly election: Sathupalli (SC)
Party	Candidate	Votes	%	±%
TDP	Sandra Venkata Veeraiah	79,491	46.97	
INC	Chandrasekhar Sambhani	65,483	38.70	
PRP	Ravi Nagabathini	16,264	9.61	
BSP	Tirumalaiah Telluri	2,642	1.56	
LSP	Chokkaiah Jadi	1,959	1.16	
IND	Venkateswara Rao Kuvvarapu	1,546	0.91	
BJP	Kolikapogu Musalaiah	1,001	0.59	
IND	Konduri Susmitha Koteswara Rao	834	0.49	
Majority		14,008	8.27	
Turnout		169,220		
Swing to TDP from INC		Swing		

=== 2004 ===
2004 Andhra Pradesh Legislative Assembly election: Sathupalli
Party	Candidate	Votes	%	±%
INC	Jalagam Venkat Rao	89,986	51.27	
TDP	Tummala Nageswara Rao	80,450	45.84	
IND	Thodem Durgamma	3,091	1.76	
IND	Bottu Sreepathi	1,237	0.70	
IND	Nallanti Rathaiah	750	0.43	
Majority		9,536	5.43	
Turnout		175,514		
Swing to INC from TDP		Swing		

=== 1999 ===
1999 Andhra Pradesh Legislative Assembly election: Sathupalli
Party	Candidate	Votes	%	±%
TDP	Thummala Nageswara Rao	87,717	57.33	
INC	Ponguleti Sudhakar Reddy	56,688	37.05	
MCPI(S)	John Samuelu Madipalli	2,914	1.90	
ATDP	Kanagala Samba Siva Rao	2,515	1.64	
IND	Ketchala Kalpana	2,191	1.43	
IND	Narsireddi Bajjuri	392	0.26	
AJBP (Note: Ajeya Bharat Party)	Nrusimhadri Padmavathi	302	0.20	
NTDP	Gangula Pulla Rao	280	0.18	
Majority		31,029	20.28	
Turnout		157,063	82.90	
TDP hold		Swing		

=== 1994 ===
1994 Andhra Pradesh Legislative Assembly election: Sathupalli
Party	Candidate	Votes	%	±%
TDP	Nageswara Rao Thummala	74,049	51.55	
INC	Prasada Rao Jalagam	66,455	46.26	
JP	Muppidi Krishna Rao	1,238	0.86	
BSP	Kandimalla Venkata Rao	1,149	0.80	
IND	Nalagala Mangapathi	377	0.26	
IND	Jupalli Dasarathi Rao	161	0.11	
IND	Shaik Budan	116	0.08	
IND	Jasti Rama Rajaiah	111	0.08	
Majority		7,594	5.29	
Turnout		145,537	83.32	
Swing to TDP from INC		Swing		

=== 1989 ===
1989 Andhra Pradesh Legislative Assembly election: Sathupalli
Party	Candidate	Votes	%	±%
INC	Jalagam Prasada Rao	61,389	48.69	
TDP	Tummala Nageswara Rao	54,960	43.59	
IND	Jogarao Lakkineni	9,732	7.72	
Majority		6,429	5.10	
Turnout		131,216	84.65	
Swing to INC from TDP		Swing		

=== 1985 ===
1985 Andhra Pradesh Legislative Assembly election: Sathupalli
Party	Candidate	Votes	%	±%
TDP	Nageswara Rao Tummala	49,990	51.21	
INC	Lakkeneni Joga Rao	46,172	47.29	
IND	Eshwarapragada Venkatrama Rao	713	0.73	
IND	Ganta Nageswara Rao	644	0.66	
IND	Sanga Panduranga	107	0.11	
Majority		3,818	3.92	
Turnout		98,776	77.92	
Swing to TDP from INC		Swing		

=== 1983 ===
1983 Andhra Pradesh Legislative Assembly election: Sathupalli
Party	Candidate	Votes	%	±%
INC	Jalagam Prasada Rao	42,494	52.19	
IND	Thummala Nageswara Rao	36,278	44.56	
IND	Satyanarayana Devineni	2,236	2.75	
INC(J)	Somaraju Venkata Kishan	412	0.51	
Majority		6,216	7.63	
Turnout		82,608	75.78	
INC hold		Swing		

=== 1979 by-election ===
1979 Andhra Pradesh Legislative Assembly by-election: Sathupalli
Party	Candidate	Votes	%	±%
INC(I)	Jalagam Vengala Rao	48,602	61.85	
IND	U. Satyam	25,544	32.51	
IND	G. S. Reddy	2,721	3.46	
IND	T. K. Kodandaram	959	1.22	
IND	S. Vengalrao	749	0.95	
Majority		23,058	29.35	
Turnout		78,575		
INC(I) hold		Swing		

=== 1978 ===
1978 Andhra Pradesh Legislative Assembly election: Sathupalli
Party	Candidate	Votes	%	±%
INC	Jalagam Vengala Rao	42,102	52.79	
JP	Kaloji Narayana Rao	19,483	24.43	
INC(I)	Vummalla Santhi Ram	14,943	18.74	
IND	P. S. Prasad Rao Yarlagadda	1,214	1.52	
IND	M. R. K. Thakur	1,149	1.44	
IND	P. V. Raju	856	1.07	
Majority		22,619	28.36	
Turnout		81,974	82.94	
INC win (new seat)				

== Trivia ==
- Jalagam Vengala Rao, former Chief Minister of Andhra Pradesh represented the constituency four times.

== See also ==
- Sathupalli
- List of constituencies of the Telangana Legislative Assembly
