= Kunamneni Sambasiva Rao =

Indian politician

Kunamneni Sambasiva Rao కూనంనేని సాంబశివ రావు
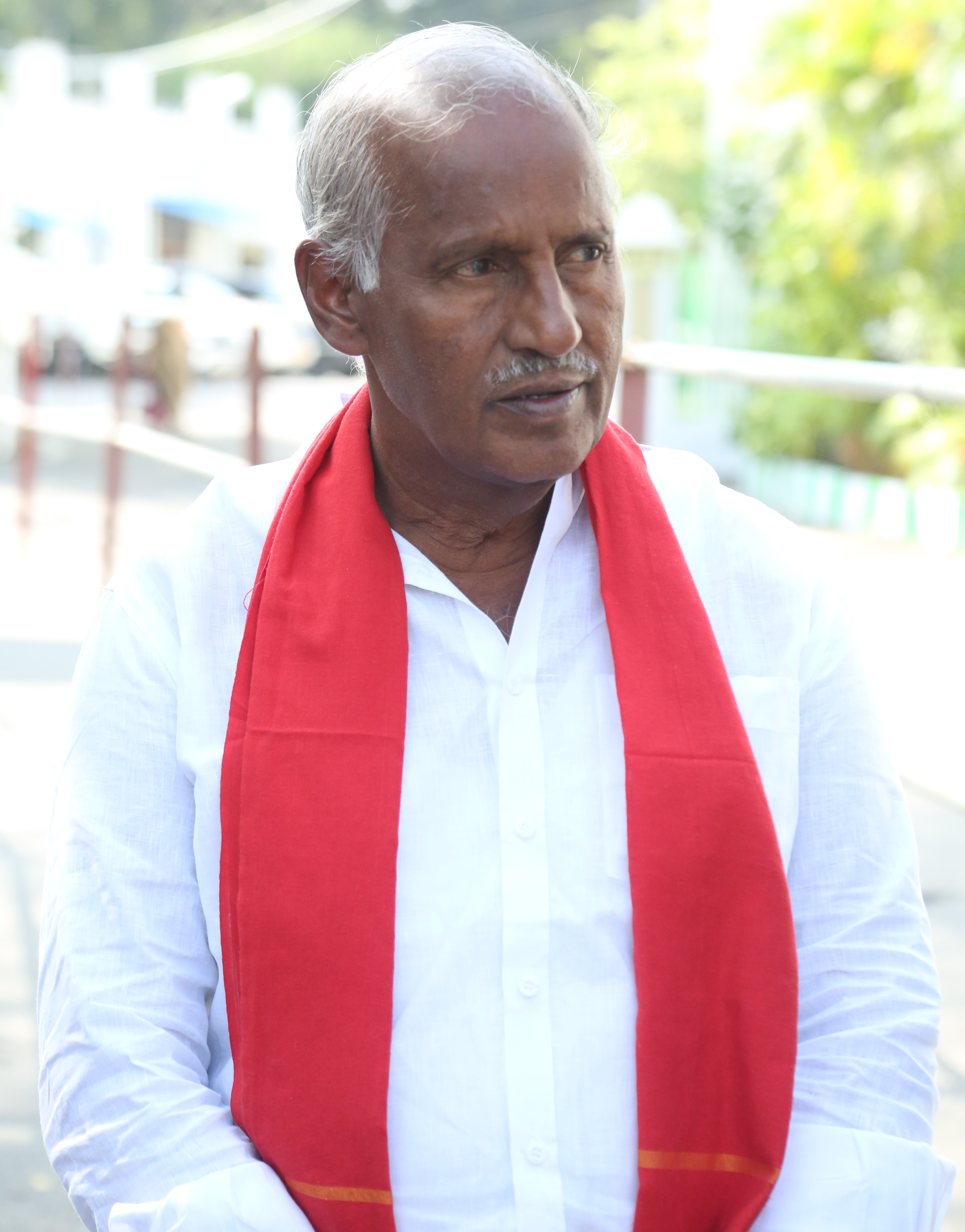
- Kunamneni in a press meet

Member of the Telangana Legislative Assembly
- Incumbent
- Assumed office 6 December 2023
- Preceded by: Vanama Venkateswara Rao
- Constituency: Kothagudem

Secretary of the Communist Party of India Telangana State Council
- Incumbent
- Assumed office 8 September 2022
- Preceded by: Chada Venkata Reddy

Member of the Andhra Legislative Assembly
- In office 16 May 2009 – 16 May 2014
- Preceded by: Vanama Venkateswara Rao
- Succeeded by: Jalagam Venkat Rao
- Constituency: Kothagudem

Personal details
- Born: 1966 (age 59–60)
- Party: Communist Party of India
- Occupation: Politician

Kunamneni Sambasiva Rao (born 1956) known mononymously by his surname as Kunamneni, is an Indian politician and leader of Communist Party of India (CPI). He was elected as secretary of CPI Telangana State Council in September 2022. He is the current MLA from Kothagudem.

== Career ==
Kunamneni was elected as a member of Andhra Pradesh Legislative Assembly from Kothagudem in 2009. He won the 2023 Telangana Legislative Assembly Election from Kothagudem Constituency on CPI ticket as an alliance candidate supported by Congress.
