= Banjara Lake =

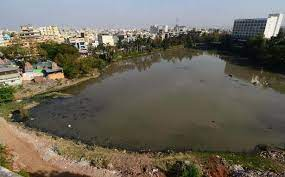

- Location within Hyderabad Location within Telangana Location within India
- Location: Banjara Hills, Hyderabad, Telangana, India
- Coordinates: 17°24′39.55″N 78°26′55.4″E
- Type: artificial lake
- Basin countries: India
- Max. depth: 5 m (16 ft)
- Settlements: Hyderabad

Banjara Lake also known as Hamed Khan Kunta or Anthagani Kunta is a small water body situated in Banjara Hills in Hyderabad, Telangana, India.

== History ==
The lake was built in 1930. At the time the locality had mansions and residences of royal elite. It was once spread over an area of more than one kilometre.

== Conservation ==
The lake receives sewer water from adjoining localities. Efforts are on to conserve the lake by organisations like Save Our Urban Lakes (SOUL).

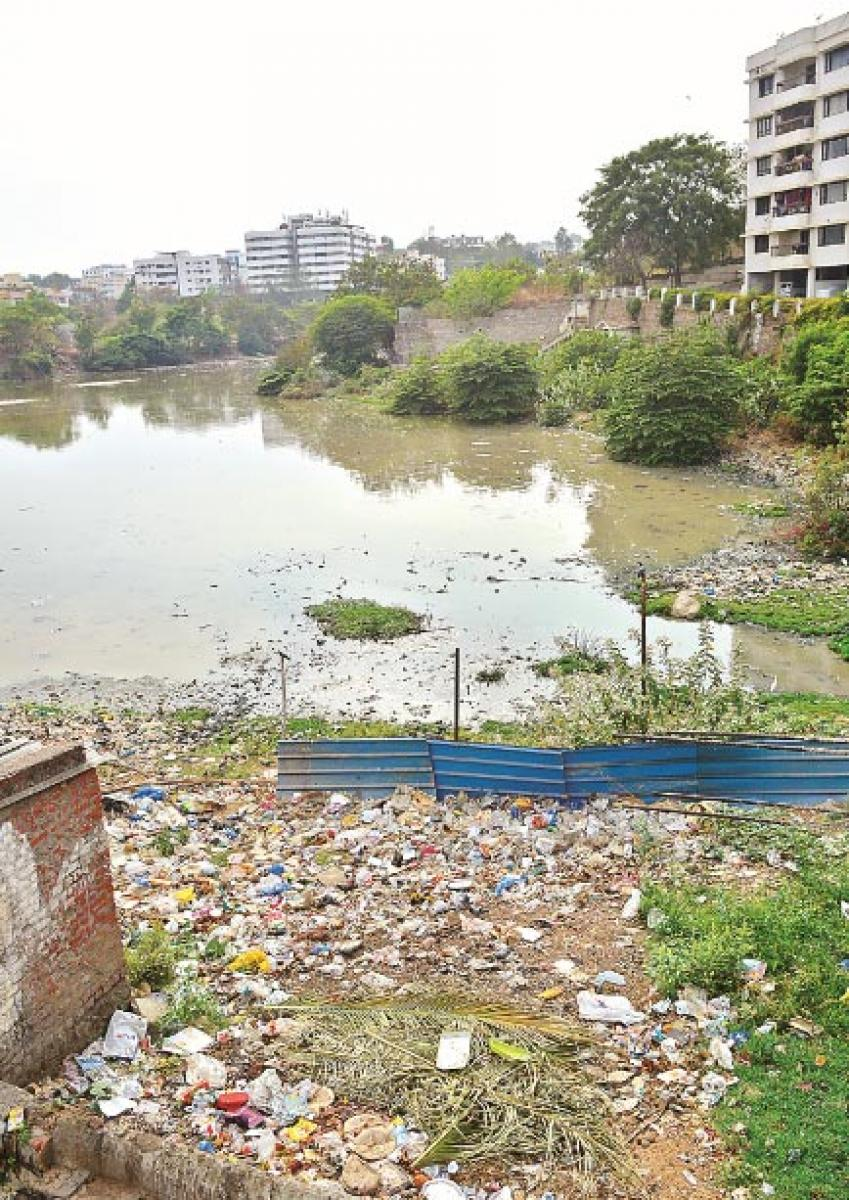
Banjara lake dumped with debris causing pollution
