= Vanama Venkateswara Rao =

Indian politician

Vanama Venkateswara Rao వనమా వెంకటేశ్వరరావు

Member of the Telangana Legislative Assembly
- In office 2018–2023
- Preceded by: Jalagam Venkat Rao
- Succeeded by: Kunamneni Sambasiva Rao
- Constituency: Kothagudem

Personal details
- Born: 1 November 1944 (age 81) Palvancha
- Party: Telangana Rashtra Samithi
- Children: Raghavendra Rao; Ramakrishna; Srimanthula Aruna; Adika Vijaya Lakshmi

Vanama Venkateswara Rao is a politician from Telangana state and a member of the Legislative Assembly constituency of Kothagudem.

== Personal life ==
He has 4 children namely, Raghavendra Rao, Rama Krishna Rao, Srimanthula Aruna and Adika Vijaya Lakshmi

== Political career ==
Venkateswara Rao was elected as a MLA from Kothagudem for the first time in 1989. He later represented the constituency in 1999 and 2004, besides serving as a minister in the cabinet of former Chief Minister Y. S. Rajasekhara Reddy in 2008. In the Telangana general elections of 2018, he contested on an Indian National Congress party ticket and won with a majority of 4120 votes over the nearest Telangana Rashtra Samithi party candidate Jalagam Venkat Rao. He resigned from the Congress Party after the 2018 elections and joined the Telangana Rashtra Samithi party.
