= Jalagam Vengal Rao Park =

Park in Banjara Hills, India

- Location within Telangana
- Type: Natural Area
- Location: Banjara Hills, Hyderabad, Telangana
- Nearest city: Hyderabad
- Coordinates: 17°25′22″N 78°26′56″E
- Area: 10 acres (4.0 ha)
- Operator: GHMC
- Open: 2002

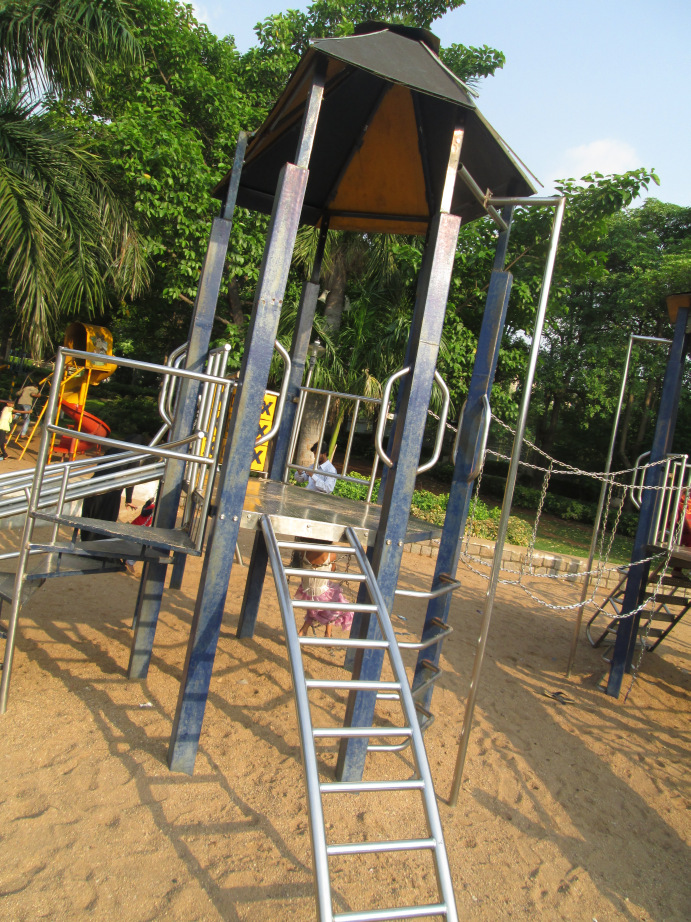

Jalagam Vengal Rao Park (also known as JVR Park) is a park located in Banjara Hills in Hyderabad, Telangana, India. The park was named after the 5th Chief Minister of Andhra Pradesh – Jalagam Vengala Rao.

The park maintenance has been handed over to a private contractor, by the GHMC. Park now also hosts parties and musical soirees.
