= Puvvada Ajay Kumar =

Indian politician

Minister of Transport Government of Telangana
- In office 08 September 2019 – 03 December 2023
- Chief Minister: K. Chandrasekhar Rao
- Preceded by: P. Mahender Reddy
- Succeeded by: Ponnam Prabhakar

Member of Telangana Legislative assembly
- In office 2014–2023
- Preceded by: Thummala Nageswara Rao
- Succeeded by: Thummala Nageshwar Rao
- Constituency: Khammam

Personal details
- Born: 19 April 1965 (age 61)
- Party: Telangana Rashtra Samithi
- Occupation: Politician
- Profession: M.Sc. (Agriculture from Bangalore)

Puvvada Ajay Kumar (born 19 April 1965) is an Indian politician who was the former transport minister of Telangana from 2019 to 2023. He is also the chairman of Mamata Academy of Medical Sciences, Hyderabad, and Mamata Medical, Nursing, and Dental Colleges in Khammam. He was elected as a Member of Legislative Assembly from the Khammam constituency. Later, he joined in Telangana Rastra Samiti.

== Career ==
Initially, his political career started as a Central Executive Council member of the YSR Congress Party. Later, he contested as a Member of Legislative Assembly from the Indian National Congress party and was elected to the Legislative Assembly of Telangana in the General Elections 2014. Finally, in 2016, he quit the Indian National Congress Party and joined the Telangana Rastra Samithi. In 2019, he was appointed as the Minister of Transport of Telangana.
