= Kothagudem Assembly constituency =

Constituency of the Telangana legislative assembly in India

Coordinates: 17.54°N 80.62°E

Kothagudem
- Constituency No. 117 for the Telangana Legislative Assembly
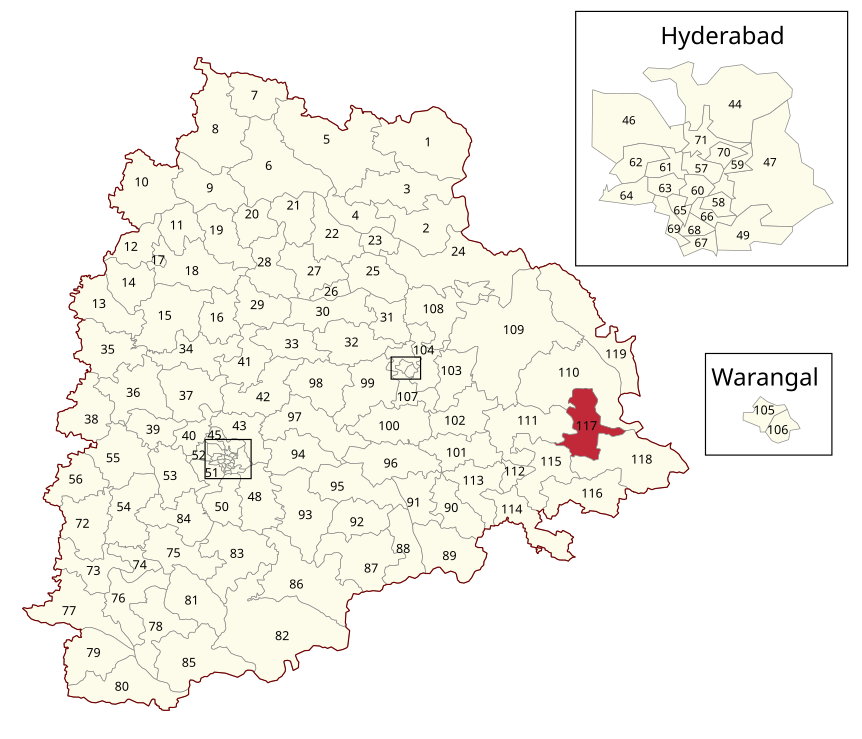
- Location of Kothagudem Assembly constituency within Telangana

Constituency details
- Country: India
- Region: South India
- State: Telangana
- District: Bhadradri Kothagudem
- Lok Sabha constituency: Khammam
- Established: 1978
- Total electors: 2,18,146
- Reservation: None

Member of Legislative Assembly
- 3rd Telangana Legislative Assembly
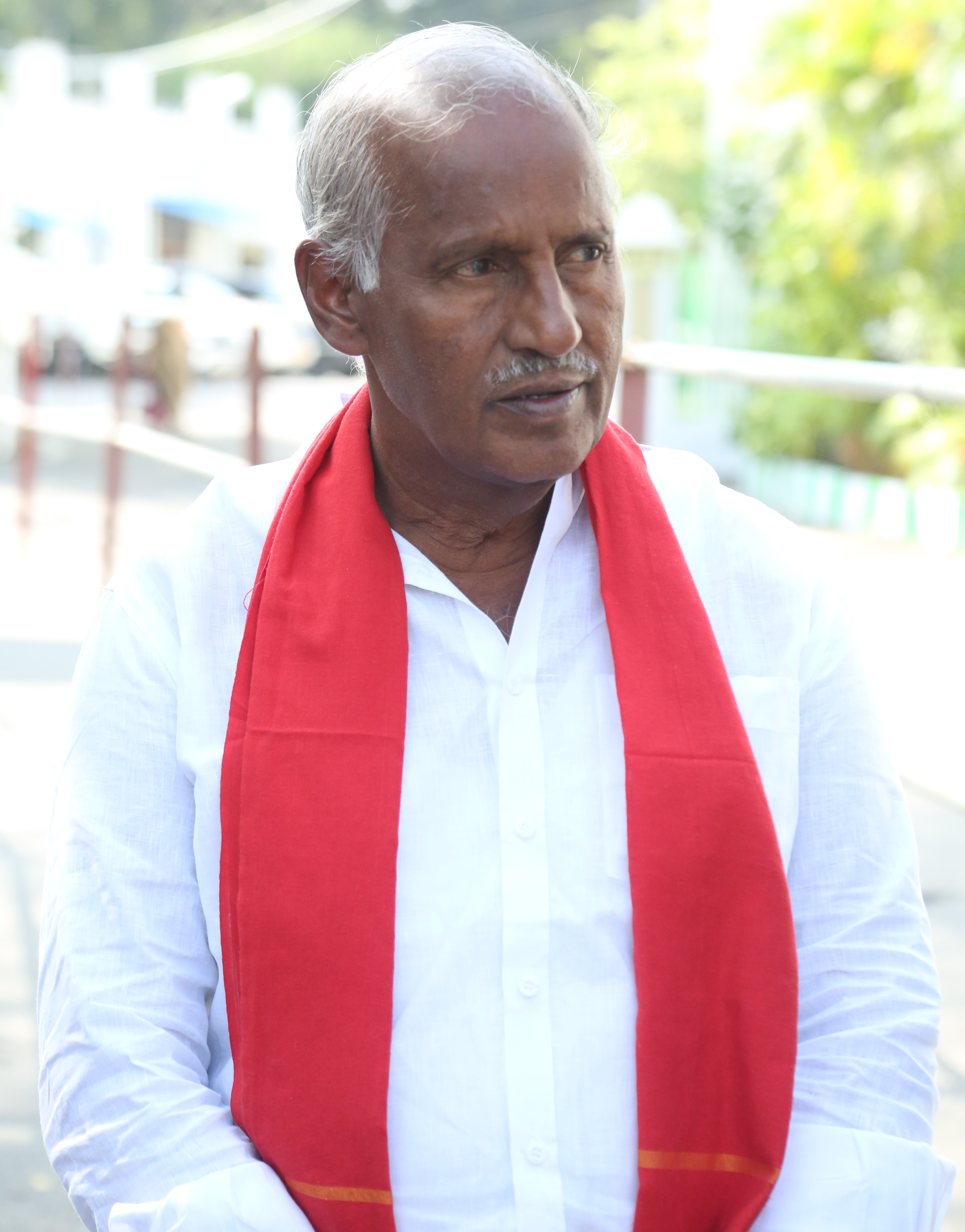
- Incumbent Kunamneni Sambasiva Rao
- Party: CPI
- Elected year: 2023

Kothagudem Assembly constituency is a constituency of Telangana Legislative Assembly, India. It is one of constituencies in Bhadradri Kothagudem district. It includes the towns of Kothagudem and Palwancha and part of Khammam Lok Sabha constituency.

Jalagam Venkat Rao is representing this constituency for the second time. He was elected as his opposition candidate Vanama Venkateshwar Rao from Congress party filed a false affidavit report in the 2018 TS assembly elections. As a result, Jalagam Venkat Rao filed a case in the High court and won it in 2023. As a result, the High court declared Jalagam Venkat Rao as a MLA from this constituency in 2023, just five months before the TS assembly elections.

== Mandals ==
The Assembly Constituency presently comprises the following Mandals:

Mandal
Kothagudem
Palwancha
Sujatanagar
Chunchupally
Laxmidevipalli

== Members of Legislative Assembly ==
List of Elected Members to Kothagudem Constituency.

Year	Member	Political party
United Andhra Pradesh
1978	Kasaiah Chekuri	Janata Party
1983	Koneru Nageswara Rao	Telugu Desam Party
1985	Koneru Nageswara Rao	Telugu Desam Party
1989	Vanama Venkateswara Rao	Indian National Congress
1994	Koneru Nageswara Rao	Telugu Desam Party
1999	Vanama Venkateswara Rao	Indian National Congress
2004	Vanama Venkateswara Rao	Indian National Congress
2009	Kunamneni Sambasiva Rao	Communist Party of India
Telangana Legislative Assembly
2014	Jalagam Venkat Rao	Telangana Rashtra Samithi
2018	Vanama Venkateswara Rao	Indian National Congress
2023	Kunamneni Sambasiva Rao	Communist Party of India

== Election results ==
Vote share of Winning candidates
2023	42.75%
2018	46.78%
2014	30.67%
2009	32.89%
2004	59.88%
1999	51.40%
1994	56.88%
1989	48.24%
1985	55.23%
1983	42.16%
1978	47.72%

=== 2023 ===
2023 Telangana Legislative Assembly election: Kothagudem
Party	Candidate	Votes	%	±%
CPI	Kunamneni Sambasiva Rao (Note: CPI candidate was officially backed by INC)	80,336	42.75	
AIFB	Jalagam Venkat Rao	53,789	28.62	
BRS	Vanama Venkateswara Rao	37,555	19.98	
JSP	Surendarrao Lakkineni (Note: JSP candidate was backed by BJP-led NDA)	1,945	1.04	
BSP	Yerra Kamesh	1,879	1.00	
NOTA	None of the above	1,427	0.76	
IND	19 Independent Candidates	7,919	4.21	
OTH	6 Other Party Candidates	3,070	1.63	
Majority		26,547	14.13	
Turnout		187,920		
Swing to CPI from INC		Swing		

=== 2018 ===
2018 Telangana Legislative Assembly election: Kothagudem
Party	Candidate	Votes	%	±%
INC	Vanama Venkateswara Rao	81,118	46.78	
TRS	Jalagam Venkat Rao	76,979	44.39	
BLFP	Adavalli Krishna	5,520	3.18	
IND	Vamsi Krishna Essampalli	1,943	1.12	
BJP	Byreddy Prabhakar Reddy	1,466	0.85	
IND	Komaram Buchaiah	1,161	0.67	
NOTA	None of the Above	1,103	0.64	
IND	7 Independent Candidates	2,606	1.50	
OTH	4 Other Party Candidates	1,525	0.88	
Majority		4,139	2.39	
Turnout		173,421	81.75	
Swing to INC from TRS		Swing		

=== 2014 ===
2014 Telangana Legislative Assembly election: Kothagudem
Party	Candidate	Votes	%	±%
TRS	Jalagam Venkat Rao	50,688	30.67	
YSRCP	Vanama Venkateswara Rao	34,167	20.67	
TDP	Koneru Satyanarayana	28,363	17.16	
IND	Adavalli Krishna	22,989	13.91	
CPI	Kunamneni Sambasiva Rao	20,994	12.70	
IND	Sampath Ponugoti	1,874	1.13	
NOTA	None of the above	1,356	0.82	
OTH	6 Other Party Candidates	4,832	2.92	
Majority		16,521	10.00	
Turnout				
Swing to TRS from CPI		Swing		

=== 2009 ===
2009 Andhra Pradesh Legislative Assembly election: Kothagudem
Party	Candidate	Votes	%	±%
CPI	Kunamneni Sambasiva Rao	47,028	32.89	
INC	Vanama Venkateswara Rao	45,024	31.49	
PRP	Adavalli Krishna	38,876	27.19	
LSP	Bhupathi Lavanya	2,585	1.81	
IND	N. Srinivasu	2,105	1.47	
BJP	Kamala Manohar Rao Gudibanda	1,768	1.24	
BSP	Pappula Sudhakar	1,293	0.90	
IND	6 Independent Candidates	3,169	2.22	
OTH	2 Other Party Candidates	1,138	0.80	
Majority		2,004	1.40	
Turnout				
Swing to CPI from INC		Swing		

=== 2004 ===
2004 Andhra Pradesh Legislative Assembly election: Kothagudem
Party	Candidate	Votes	%	±%
INC	Vanama Venkateswara Rao	76,333	59.88	
TDP	Koneru Nageswara Rao	48,561	38.09	
BSP	Sudhakar Pappula	1,361	1.07	
PPOI	Gunipati Sudhakar	1,220	0.96	
Majority		27,772	21.79	
Turnout		127,475		
INC hold		Swing		

=== 1999 ===
1999 Andhra Pradesh Legislative Assembly election: Kothagudem
Party	Candidate	Votes	%	±%
INC	Vanama Venkateswara Rao	60,632	51.40	
TDP	Ayachitam Nagavani	43,918	37.23	
CPI(M)	Ilaiah Kasani	10,787	9.14	
MCPI(S)	Mallela Usha Rani	1,258	1.07	
BSP	Alamanda Ramulu	652	0.55	
AJBP	Srirangam Sitarama Charyulu	351	0.30	
IND	Bachala Laxmaiah	319	0.27	
IND	Bendapudi Nagaraju	52	0.04	
Majority		16,714	14.17	
Turnout		121,514	70.25	
Swing to INC from TDP		Swing		

=== 1994 ===
1994 Andhra Pradesh Legislative Assembly election: Kothagudem
Party	Candidate	Votes	%	±%
TDP	Koneru Nageswara Rao	67,104	56.88	
INC	Vanama Venkateswara Rao	46,117	39.09	
BJP	Boinapalli Radhakrishna Rao	1,757	1.49	
BSP	Dr. D. Seshagiri Rao	434	0.37	
SAP	Kamalakara Rao Gandikota	205	0.17	
SP	Mudusa Sanjeeva Kumar	112	0.09	
IND	9 Independent Candidates	2,240	1.91	
Majority		20,987	17.79	
Turnout		119,555	75.53	
Swing to TDP from INC		Swing		

=== 1989 ===
1989 Andhra Pradesh Legislative Assembly election: Kothagudem
Party	Candidate	Votes	%	±%
INC	Vanama Venkateswara Rao	49,514	48.24	
TDP	Nageswara Rao Koneru	49,267	48.00	
MCPI	Tulasi Ramulu Nateshan	1,468	1.43	
IND	Chandram Jadala	1,067	1.04	
IND	Gavusuddin Sayed	524	0.51	
MGS (Note: Mahatama Gandhi Samajam)	Koppula Thirapathy	316	0.31	
IND	Manyam Padmaraju	240	0.23	
BSP	K. Asheervadham	235	0.23	
Majority		247	0.24	
Turnout		107,412	75.46	
Swing to INC from TDP		Swing		

=== 1985 ===
1985 Andhra Pradesh Legislative Assembly election: Kothagudem
Party	Candidate	Votes	%	±%
TDP	Nageswara Rao Koneru	45,286	55.23	
INC	Pongikati Sudhakar Reddy	35,120	42.84	
IND	Chandam Jadala	474	0.58	
IND	Gulam Mustafa	349	0.43	
IND	Gali Koteswara Rao	240	0.29	
IND	Yeluri Sarveswara Rao	220	0.27	
IND	Ankus Gonda	133	0.16	
IND	Sirangi Venkateswarlu	102	0.12	
IND	Komaraiah Sripathi	65	0.08	
Majority		10,166	12.39	
Turnout		83,212	69.37	
Swing to TDP from Independent		Swing		

=== 1983 ===
1983 Andhra Pradesh Legislative Assembly election: Kothagudem
Party	Candidate	Votes	%	±%
IND	Nageswara Rao Koneru	30,780	42.16	
INC	Kasaiah Chekuri	21,895	29.99	
CPI	Komaraiah Manubothula	18,540	25.40	
BJP	Jayaraj K. R. W.	1,268	1.74	
IND	Linga Vishwanatham	248	0.34	
INC(J)	Anjana Krishna Rao	179	0.25	
IND	Venkateswarlu Shirangi	94	0.13	
Majority		8,885	12.17	
Turnout		74,503	70.75	
Swing to Independent from JP		Swing		

=== 1978 ===
1978 Andhra Pradesh Legislative Assembly election: Kothagudem
Party	Candidate	Votes	%	±%
JP	Kasaiah Chekuri	32,409	47.72	
INC	Vanama Venkateshwara Rao	21,761	32.04	
INC(I)	Mustafa Kamal Khan	12,162	17.91	
IND	K. R. W. Jayaraju	1,589	2.34	
Majority		10,648	15.68	
Turnout		69,578	79.98	
JP win (new seat)				

== See also ==
- List of constituencies of Telangana Legislative Assembly
