= Khammam Assembly constituency =

Constituency of the Telangana legislative assembly in India

Coordinates: 17.25°N 80.15°E

Khammam
- Constituency No. 112 for the Telangana Legislative Assembly
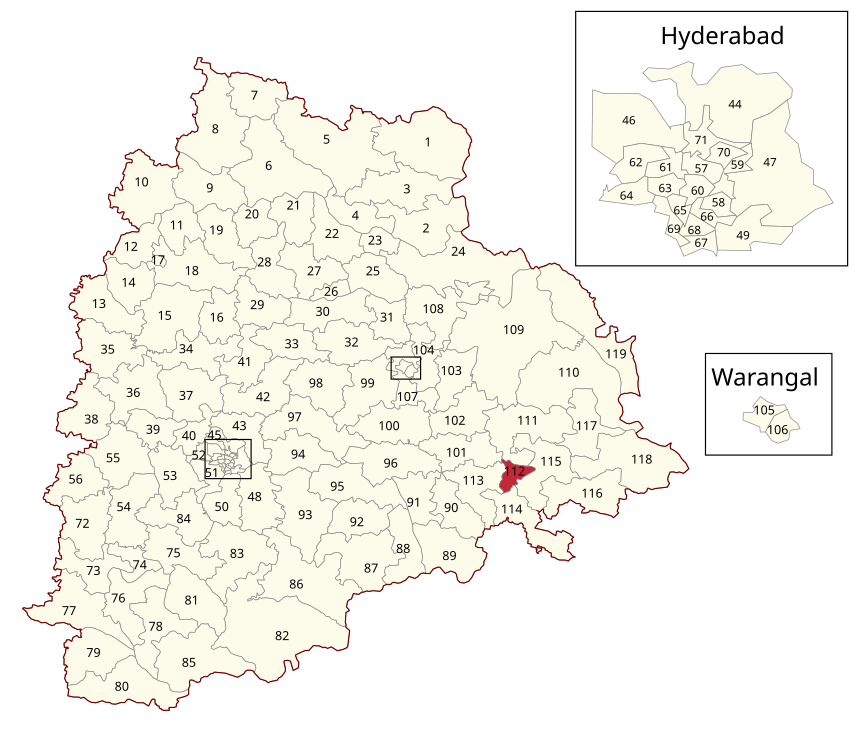
- Location of Khammam Assembly constituency within Telangana

Constituency details
- Country: India
- Region: South India
- State: Telangana
- District: Khammam
- Lok Sabha constituency: Khammam
- Established: 1951
- Total electors: 3,08,403
- Reservation: None

Member of Legislative Assembly
- 3rd Telangana Legislative Assembly
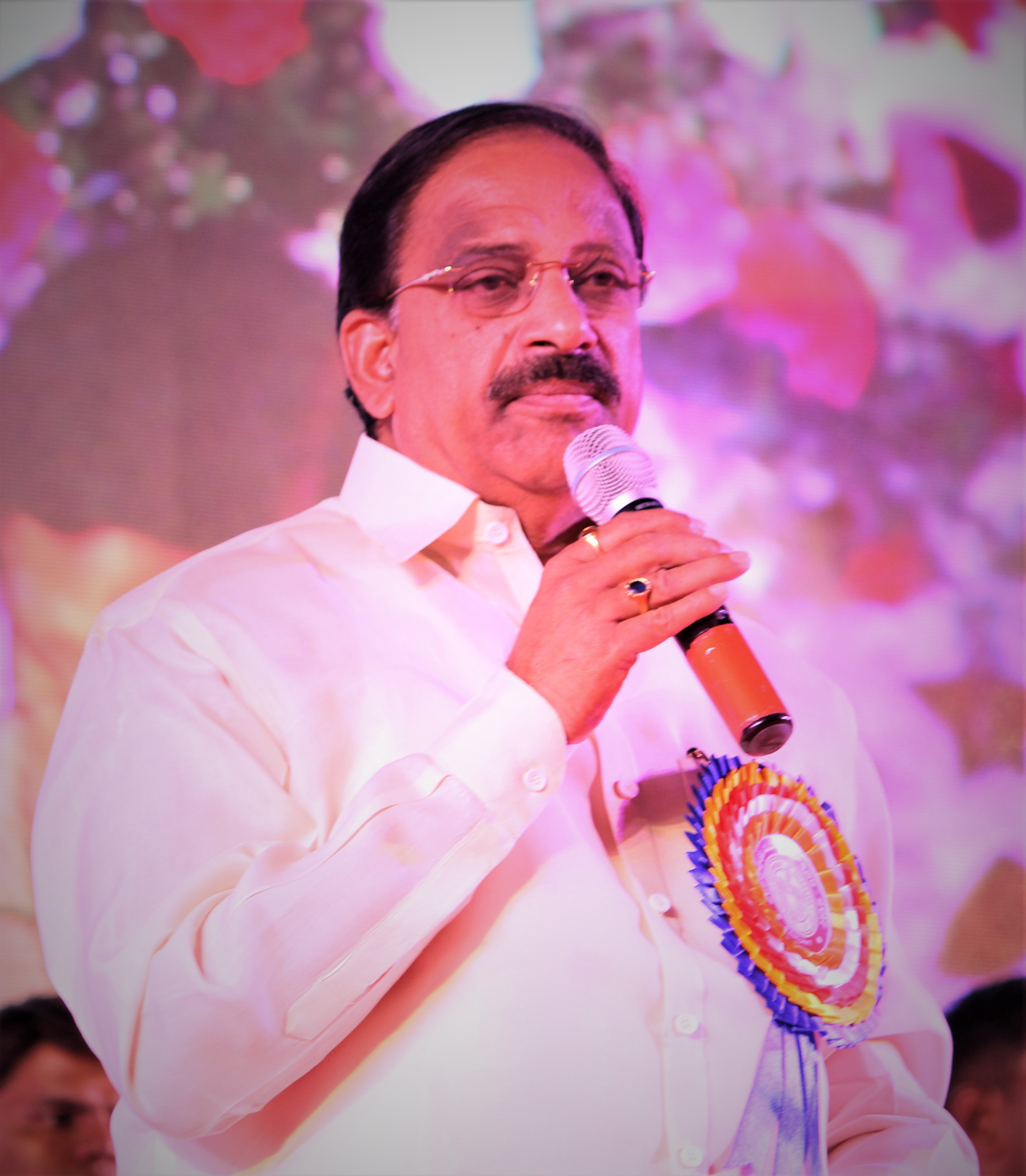
- Incumbent Thummala Nageswara Rao
- Party: INC
- Elected year: 2023

Khammam Assembly constituency is a constituency of the Telangana Legislative Assembly. It is one of the five constituencies in Khammam district. It includes the city of Khammam and is part of Khammam Lok Sabha constituency.

Thummala Nageswara Rao of Indian National Congress won the seat for the Assembly elections held on 30 November 2023.

== Mandals ==
The assembly constituency presently comprises the following mandals :

Mandal
Khammam Urban
Khammam Rural

Ragunadapalem mandal

== Members of Legislative Assembly ==
Year	Name	Party
Hyderabad
1952	Rentala Bala Guru Murthy	People's Democratic Front
1952	Buggeveeti Krishnayya	People's Democratic Front
United Andhra Pradesh
1957	N. Peddanna	People's Democratic Front
1962	Nallamala Giri Prasada Rao	Communist Party of India
1967	Mohd. Rajjab Ali	Communist Party of India(Marxist)
1972	Mohd. Rajjab Ali	Communist Party of India
1978	Kesara Anantha Reddy	Indian National Congress
1983	Manchikanti Rama Kishan Rao	Communist Party of India(Marxist)
1985	Manchikanti Rama Kishan Rao	Communist Party of India(Marxist)
1989	Puvvada Nageswar Rao	Communist Party of India
1994	Puvvada Nageswar Rao	Communist Party of India
1999	Younis Sultan	Indian National Congress
2004	Tammineni Veerabhadram	Communist Party of India
2009	Thummala Nageswara Rao	Telugu Desam Party
Telangana Legislative Assembly
2014	Puvvada Ajay Kumar	Indian National Congress
2018	Puvvada Ajay Kumar	Telangana Rashtra Samithi
2023	Thummala Nageswara Rao	Indian National Congress

== Election results ==
Vote share of Winning candidates
2023	57.58%
2018	49.78%
2014	37.91%
2009	36.22%
2004	29.32%
1999	36.99%
1994	53.69%
1989	51.07%
1985	40.55%
1983	43.19%
1978	43.16%
1972	41.53%
1967	53.65%
1962	61.98%
1957	25.31%
1957	21.75%
1952	34.30%
1952	32.71%

=== 2023 ===
2023 Telangana Legislative Assembly election: Khammam
Party	Candidate	Votes	%	±%
INC	Thummala Nageswara Rao	136,016	57.58	New entry
BRS	Puvvada Ajay Kumar	86,635	36.67	▼13.11
JSP	Miriyala Ramakrishna	4,040	1.71	New entry
CPI(M)	Yarra Srikanth	1,940	0.82	New entry
NOTA	None of the Above	1,925	0.81	▼0.89
IND	17 Independent Candidates	3,794	1.61	Steady
OTH	11 Other Party Candidates	1,874	0.79	Steady
Majority		49,381	20.91	▲15.59
Turnout		236,224	73.12	▼2.21
Swing to INC from TRS		Swing		

=== 2018 ===
2018 Telangana Legislative Assembly election: Khammam
Party	Candidate	Votes	%	±%
TRS	Ajay Kumar Puvvada	102,760	49.78	▲42.21
TDP	Nama Nageswara Rao	91,769	44.46	▲9.61
NOTA	None of the Above	3,513	1.70	▲0.94
BJP	Vuppala Sarada	2,325	1.13	New entry
IND	7 Independent Candidates	3,560	1.72	Steady
OTH	3 Other Party Candidates	2,501	1.21	Steady
Majority		10,991	5.32	▲2.26
Turnout		206,428	75.33	▲4.94
Swing to TRS from INC		Swing		

=== 2014 ===
2014 Andhra Pradesh Legislative Assembly election: Khammam
Party	Candidate	Votes	%	±%
INC	Ajay Kumar Puvvada	70,465	37.91	▲22.53
TDP	Thummala Nageswar Rao	64,783	34.85	▼1.37
YSRCP	Kurakula Nagabhushaiah	25,032	13.47	New entry
TRS	Gundala Krishna	14,065	7.57	New entry
LSP	Ravi Maruth Popuri	4,448	2.39	▼0.03
NOTA	None of the Above	1,408	0.76	New entry
IND	14 Independent Candidates	3,142	1.73	Steady
OTH	5 Other Party Candidates	2,472	1.33	Steady
Majority		5,682	3.06	▲1.44
Turnout		185,886	70.39	
Swing to INC from TDP		Swing		

=== 2009 ===
2009 Andhra Pradesh Legislative Assembly election: Khammam
Party	Candidate	Votes	%	±%
TDP	Thummala Nageswara Rao	55,555	36.22	▲13.09
IND	Jalagam Venkat Rao	53,083	34.60	Steady
INC	Younus Sultan	23,595	15.38	▼7.03
PRP	Eswarapragada Hari Babu	14,383	9.38	
LSP	Dr. Samineni Raghavulu	3,720	2.42	
BJP	Kondapalli Sreedhar Reddy	720	0.47	
BSP	Hussain Syed	676	0.44	▼0.63
IND	Medipalli Nageswar Rao	620	0.40	
PPOI	Palavarapu Sree Ramulu	502	0.33	
IND	Palakurthy Krishna	321	0.21	
IND	Podila Vasu	228	0.15	
Majority		2,472	1.62	▼4.57
Turnout				
Swing to TDP from CPI		Swing		

=== 2004 ===
2004 Andhra Pradesh Legislative Assembly election: Khammam
Party	Candidate	Votes	%	±%
CPI(M)	Thammineni Veerabhadram	46,505	29.32	
TDP	Balasani Laxminarayana	36,685	23.13	▼8.95
INC	Younis Sultan	35,544	22.41	▼14.58
CPI	Puvvada Nageswara Rao	34,825	21.96	▼7.35
IND	Mellachervu Venkateswara Rao	1,826	1.15	
BSP	Jamallamudi Dasu	1,700	1.07	
JP	Jamalapurapu Rameswara Rao	409	0.26	
IND	Budigem Durga	298	0.19	
IND	Shaik Moulali	251	0.16	
IND	Kandaraboina Ram Babu	223	0.14	
IND	Pinnelli Anjaiah	209	0.13	
IND	Katta Venkateswarlu	148	0.09	
Majority		9,820	6.19	▲1.28
Turnout		158,623		
Swing to CPI(M) from INC		Swing		

=== 1999 ===
1999 Andhra Pradesh Legislative Assembly election: Khammam
Party	Candidate	Votes	%	±%
INC	Younis Sultan	51,159	36.99	▲2.00
TDP	Balasani Laxminarayana	44,372	32.08	
CPI	Puvvada Nageswara Rao	40,539	29.31	▼24.38
IND	Kondapalli Jagan Mohan Rao	740	0.53	
MCPI(S)	Mohammed Jameel Ahmed	651	0.47	
IND	Nelloori Basaveswar Rao	511	0.37	
JD(S)	Kounjula Narsi Reddy	228	0.16	
IND	Gandham Srinivasa Rao	121	0.09	
Majority		6,787	4.91	▼13.79
Turnout		143,888	71.33	▲1.22
Swing to INC from CPI		Swing		

=== 1994 ===
1994 Andhra Pradesh Legislative Assembly election: Khammam
Party	Candidate	Votes	%	±%
CPI	Puvvada Nageswar Rao	68,744	53.69	▲2.62
INC	Zaheer Ali Mohammad	44,806	34.99	▼9.37
BJP	Darapuneni Koteswar Rao	7,744	6.05	
MBT	Ekbal Pasha Shaik	443	0.35	
SP	Harinadha Rao Boddu	174	0.14	
IND	12 Independent Candidates	6,128	4.78	
Majority		23,938	18.70	▲11.99
Turnout		129,911	70.11	▼5.63
CPI hold		Swing		

=== 1989 ===
1989 Andhra Pradesh Legislative Assembly election: Khammam
Party	Candidate	Votes	%	±%
CPI	Puvvada Nageswar Rao	61,590	51.07	
INC	Durga Prasad Rao	53,495	44.36	
IND	Achaiah Gurram	4,164	3.45	
IND	Khader Ali Syed	1,356	1.12	
Majority		8,095	6.71	
Turnout		125,863	75.74	
Swing to CPI from CPI(M)		Swing		

=== 1985 ===
1985 Andhra Pradesh Legislative Assembly election: Khammam
Party	Candidate	Votes	%	±%
CPI(M)	Manchikanti Rama Kishan Rao	38,963	40.55	
INC	Mohammad Mujaffaruddin	36,198	37.67	
IND	Venkayalapati Venkaiah	19,887	20.70	
IND	Nune Laxminarayan	669	0.70	
IND	Arvapalli Vidya Sagar	374	0.39	
Majority		2,765	2.88	
Turnout		97,176	72.75	
CPI(M) hold		Swing		

=== 1983 ===
1983 Andhra Pradesh Legislative Assembly election: Khammam
Party	Candidate	Votes	%	±%
CPI(M)	Manchikanti Ramkrishna Rao	37,771	43.19	▲13.93
INC	Anantha Reddy Kisari	29,321	33.53	▼9.63
IND	Baswa Narayana Kutumbaka	19,704	22.53	
INC(J)	Surepalli Chirangeevi	658	0.75	
Majority		8,450	9.66	▼4.24
Turnout		88,741	74.12	▼6.02
Swing to CPI(M) from INC(I)		Swing		

=== 1978 ===
1978 Andhra Pradesh Legislative Assembly election: Khammam
Party	Candidate	Votes	%	±%
INC(I)	Kesara Anantha Reddy	32,335	43.16	▲4.32
CPI(M)	Chirravoori Laxmi Narsaiah	21,918	29.26	▲11.81
CPI	Mohammad Rajab Ali	19,594	26.15	▼15.38
IND	Tajuddin (Shaik)	840	1.12	
IND	Ramaiah Ketineni	233	0.31	
Majority		10,417	13.90	▲11.21
Turnout		76,472	80.14	▲5.65
Swing to INC(I) from CPI		Swing		

=== 1972 ===
1972 Andhra Pradesh Legislative Assembly election: Khammam
Party	Candidate	Votes	%	±%
CPI	Mohd. Rajjab Ali	27,046	41.53	
INC	Mustafa Kamal Khan	25,299	38.84	▲2.03
CPI(M)	Bojedla Venkatanarayana	11,364	17.45	▼36.20
IND	S. Narasimha Murti	726	1.11	
IND	Madirajul Rao	696	1.07	
Majority		1,747	2.69	▼14.15
Turnout		66,697	74.49	▼4.98
Swing to CPI from CPI(M)		Swing		

=== 1967 ===
1967 Andhra Pradesh Legislative Assembly election: Khammam
Party	Candidate	Votes	%	±%
CPI(M)	M. Razabali	30,344	53.65	
INC	S. S. P. Rao	20,820	36.81	▲0.29
IND	K. S. Rao	1,721	3.04	
IND	B. Suryanarayana	1,523	2.69	
ABJS	G. M. Thilak	1,396	2.47	
IND	M. L. Rao	760	1.34	
Majority		9,524	16.84	▼8.62
Turnout		58,791	79.47	▲6.67
Swing to CPI(M) from CPI		Swing		

=== 1962 ===
1962 Andhra Pradesh Legislative Assembly election: Khammam
Party	Candidate	Votes	%	±%
CPI	Nallamala Prasada Rao	28,394	61.98	
INC	Parcha Srinivasa Rao	16,732	36.52	
IND	Sarvadevabhatla Narasimhamurthy	685	1.50	
Majority		11,662	25.46	
Turnout		47,164	72.80	
CPI win (new seat)				

=== 1957 ===
1957 Andhra Pradesh Legislative Assembly election: Khammam (SC, 2-member constituency)
Party	Candidate	Votes	%	±%
PDF	N. Peddanna	30,407	25.31	
INC	T. Laxmikantamma	26,129	21.75	
PDF	Buggaveeti Krishnayya	26,020	21.66	
INC	K. Punnaiah	22,329	18.59	
PSP	G. Sarojini Devi	7,744	6.45	
PSP	Kona Pattabhi	7,490	6.24	
Turnout		120,119	118.75	

=== 1952 ===
1952 Hyderabad Legislative Assembly election: Khammam (2-member constituency)
Party	Candidate	Votes	%	±%
PDF	Buggeveeti Krishnaiah	33,726	34.30	
PDF	Rentala Bala Gurumoorthy	32,155	32.71	
INC	N. Sree Guru Prakash	7,904	8.04	
INC	Kolipaka Kishan Rao	7,461	7.59	
SCF	Chinthamalla Purushotham	5,394	5.49	
KMPP	Jentala Upendra Rao	4,047	4.12	
IND	Manuknoda Venkata Buchiah	3,863	3.93	
IND	Madiraju Ramkrishna Rao	3,768	3.83	
Turnout		98,318	106.99	

== See also ==
- List of constituencies of the Telangana Legislative Assembly
