= Matta Ragamayee =

Indian politician (born 1971)

Matta Ragamayee డా. మట్టా రాగమయి

Member of the Telangana Legislative Assembly
- Incumbent
- Assumed office 3 December 2023
- Preceded by: Sandra Venkata Veeraiah
- Constituency: Sathupalli

Matta Ragamayee (born 1971) is an Indian politician from the state of Telangana. She is a member of the Telangana Legislative Assembly from Sathupalli SC reserved constituency representing the Indian National Congress in the 2023 Telangana Legislative Assembly elections. She defeated BRS candidate Sandra Venkata Veeraiah by 19,440 votes.

== Personal life ==
Ragamayee completed her MBBS from Siddhartha Medical College, Vijayawada in 1997 and later did a Diploma in Tuberculosis and Chest Diseases (DTCD) from Kurnool Medical College in 2009. She is married to Matta Dayanand Vijay and has three children, Nilothpala, Viraji and Vipanchi. She entered politics in 2014.

== Political career ==
She entered politics in 2014 and resigned her government job as a doctor to contest as an MLA on YSRC party ticket. Along with her husband, she joined the then TRS in May 2016. In May 2023, she joined Congress and was nominated to contest from the Sathupalli constituency.

Ragamayee was appointed as Telangana Pradesh Congress Committee (TPCC) General Secretary on 9 June 2025.
