= Anuradha Thakur =

Indian artist

- Born: Ahmednagar, Maharashtra
- Known for: Artist, Luminescent paintings
- Notable work: Ethnic Serendipity

Anuradha Thakur is an Indian painting artist in Ahmednagar, Maharashtra. Known for her luminescent paintings, her artwork is a display of the inherent Indian culture and traditions. She is also a TEDx speaker.

Anuradha has been honoured with numerous national awards and was recently selected by the Ministry of Women and Child Development as one of the Top 100 Women Achievers in the category of Art and Culture in India.

== Early life and career ==
After graduating with a degree in fine arts, Anuradha worked with women and children in slum areas. She taught art using materials such as mud, gum from babool trees, and paints. She received a state award for this work.

In 2016, Anuradha took up painting 22 years after graduating from Arts College in Pune. Even though she had studied Fine Art, the only subject offered in 1982, abstract art didn't appeal to her. Now, she is in Hyderabad for a 10-day show titled ‘Serene Ecstacy’ at Park Hyatt.

== Awards and honours ==
- 2019: Received the iWoman Global Awards 2019 on the occasion of International Women's Day at IISER, Pashan.
- 2019: One of her paintings titled ‘Ethnic Serendipity’ has found a place in the Prime Minister of India's office.
- Top 100 Women Achievers in the category of Art and Culture in India.
