= Jalagam Vengala Rao =

Indian politician (1922-1999)

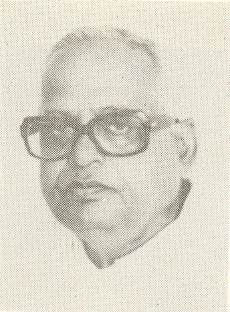

5th Chief Minister of Andhra Pradesh
- In office 10 December 1973 – 6 March 1978
- Preceded by: President's rule P. V. Narasimha Rao
- Succeeded by: Marri Chenna Reddy

Minister of Commerce and Industry (Government of India)
- In office 22 October 1986 – 2 December 1989
- Prime Minister: Rajiv Gandhi
- Preceded by: N. D. Tiwari
- Succeeded by: Ajit Singh

Home Minister, Government of Andhra Pradesh
- In office 18 July 1969 – 30 September 1971
- Chief Minister: Kasu Brahmananda Reddy

Industries Minister, Government of Andhra Pradesh
- In office 20 March 1972 – 10 January 1973
- Chief Minister: P. V. Narasimha Rao

President of Pradesh Congress Committee
- In office January 30, 1985 – October 30, 1988

Member of Parliament, Lok Sabha
- In office 1984–1991
- Preceded by: Jalagam Kondala Rao
- Succeeded by: P. V. Rangaiah Naidu
- Constituency: Khammam

Member of Andhra Pradesh Legislative Assembly
- In office 1978–1983
- Constituency: Sathupalli, Telangana
- In office 1962–1978
- Constituency: Vemsoor, Telangana

Personal details
- Born: May 1921 Soperu, Vizagapatam District, Madras Presidency, British India
- Died: 12 June 1999 (aged 78) Hyderabad, Andhra Pradesh, India
- Children: Jalagam Prasada Rao, Jalagam Venkat Rao

Jalagam Vengala Rao (4 May 1922 – 12 June 1999) was for much of his life a member of the Indian National Congress and was the Chief Minister of the Indian state of Andhra Pradesh which is now divided into two states, Telangana and Andhra Pradesh.

== Early life ==
Jalagam Vengala Rao belonged to the Padmanayaka Velama community. He was born in Soperu village, Rajam mandal, Vizianagaram district and later grew up in Bayyannagudem, Khammam district.

== Career ==
His involvement in politics began when he was in his twenties, when he supported Congress in their campaign of armed defiance against the Nizam of Hyderabad. He was jailed for his involvement in this campaign, which was protesting the tenancy laws operating in the Telangana region. He tried and failed to be elected as an independent candidate in 1952 and the period from 1952 to that time saw him occupying the post of president for the Khammam district branch of Congress and being the first chairman of the district council. The first of his successful Assembly elections was in 1962, Rao subsequently was elected on four occasions to the Legislative Assembly of Andhra Pradesh, where he represented the Sathupalli constituency of Khammam district.

=== Lok Sabha ===
He was also twice (1984, 1989)elected to the Lok Sabha - the lower house of the Parliament of India - as a representative of the Khammam district constituency.

=== As Home Minister ===
In 1968, he became State Home Minister in the state government headed by Kasu Brahmananda Reddy. Later, during his period as Chief Minister of Andhra Pradesh, an office to which he was appointed by Indira Gandhi and held between 10 December 1973 and 6 March 1978, Rao's hallmark was his administrative efficiency. He is also known for his handling and containment of Naxalite insurgency, which took place during a revival of the Telangana movement that sought independent statehood. He almost wiped out Naxalism from the state through extrajudicial encounter killings. Later, the Vimadalal commission was appointed to probe into attacks on Naxalites during his period in office and his earlier actions against Communist-inspired Naxalites during the 1960s have been referred to as a "reign of terror". The official website for the government of Andhra Pradesh refers to his tenure, which came about following a period of President's rule, politically stable. Despite that popularity, he was unable to retain power in the 1978 elections.

=== Congress split ===
When Congress split during the mid-1970s, Rao initially did not join with the faction led by Indira Gandhi that was referred to as Congress (I). However, he did join in 1984 and with his election to the Lok Sabha in that year he served in the cabinet of Rajiv Gandhi, holding the post of Union Minister for Industry until 1989. For much of this period, between 1984 and 1988, he was also president of the state organization of his political party, being the Andhra Pradesh Congress Committee.

=== As Chief Minister ===
He was the 5th Chief Minister of Andhra Pradesh from 10 December 1973 – 5 March 1978. It was during his tenure as Chief Minister that three universities namely Kakatiya University, Acharya Nagarjuna University and Sri Krishnadevaraya University were started, catering for three regions of Andhra Pradesh: Telangana, Coastal Andhra, and Rayalaseema. Rao initiated a World Telugu Conference in Hyderabad in 1975.

In 1972, the Vengala Rao government added the Koppula and Polinati Velama communities to the BC-D category from OC(forward caste) to address drought economic hardship and regional backwardness in Uttarandhra specially in srikakulam.The move was prompted by drought conditions, regional backwardness not caste Backwardness in Uttarandhra, and to support the community's demand for social representation and to support educationally and economically .Lakhs of People got hired into State and central government jobs due to this. Vengala Rao was particularly associated with an emphasis on administrative efficiency and political stability.

His government dealt with several difficult issues, including:

Telangana-related political tensions Naxalite activity Law-and-order issues Regional development Higher education Industrial development Congress factional politics

His administration has consequently received both positive assessments for administrative stability and criticism concerning its handling of political violence and Naxalite activity.

== Death ==
Jalagam Vengal Rao died on 12 June 1999.

== Family ==
He has two sons, Jalagam Prasada Rao and Jalagam Venkat Rao. Jalagam Prasada Rao was a Member of the Legislative Assembly from Satthupalli constituency for two terms and he was a minister in N. Janardhan Reddy's cabinet. He held the portfolios of Small scale industries and Panchayat Raj. Jalagam Venkat Rao, is also a politician and as of 2004 was a Member of the Legislative Assembly of Andhra Pradesh, representing the INC for the same constituency, Satthupalli, as his father.

== Commemoration ==
Rao wrote an autobiography in the Telugu language, called Naa Jeevitha Katha. The contents caused some controversy with regard to the lives of other politicians. A part of it was published in English translation by Outlook magazine.

A park in Banjara Hills, Hyderabad was named after him as Jalagam Vengal Rao Park. There is also an upscale residential neighborhood named after him – Vengal Rao Nagar - and several educational institutions.
