= Banjara Hills =

- Neighbourhood
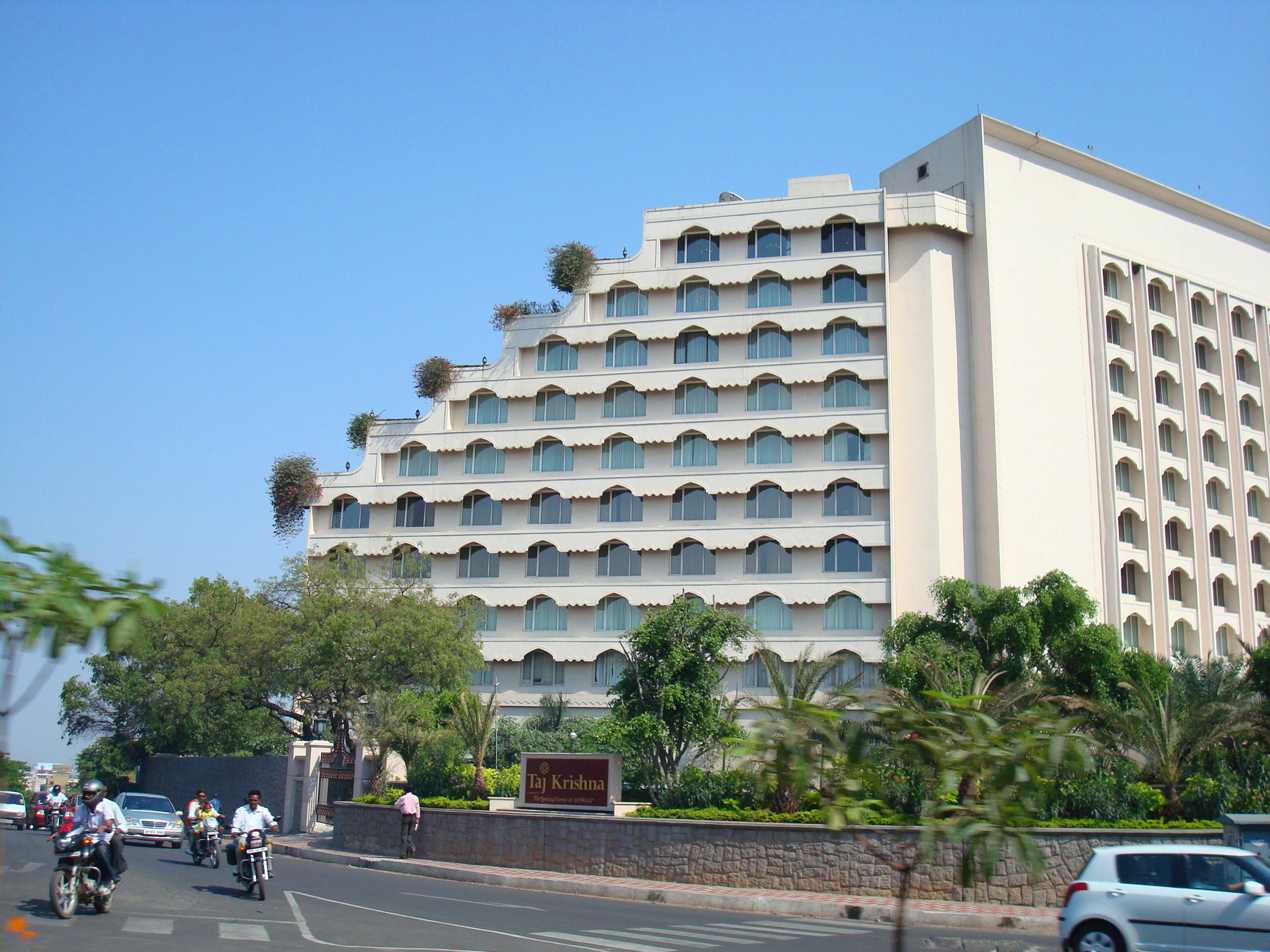
- Taj Krishna at Banjara Hills in March 2008

- Location in Hyderabad Banjara Hills (India)
- Coordinates: 17.415°N 78.440°E
- Country: India
- State: Telangana
- District: Hyderabad
- Metro: Hyderabad

Government
  - Body: GHMC

Population
  - Total: 150,000

Languages
  - Official: Telugu
- Time zone: UTC+5:30 (IST)
- PIN: 500 034
- Vehicle registration: TG-09
- Parliament constituencies: Secunderabad
- Sasana Sabha constituencies: Khairtabad
- Planning agency: GHMC

Banjara Hills is an urban commercial centre and one of the most affluent neighbourhoods in Hyderabad, Telangana, India. This is an upmarket locality close to Jubilee Hills. This area was a hilly forest and was least inhabited in the past. Only a few royal members of the Nizam's dynasty lived here, which was a hunting ground for them. This area now has completely been transformed to an urban commercial centre consisting of an array of high-end hotels, restaurants, night clubs and office buildings of global corporations. Banjara Hills is segregated by its road numbers, with each road having its own importance: the numbers run from 1 through 14.

Banjara Hills is considered the most expensive zip code in India according to Economic Times magazine and along with Jubilee Hills, is the most prestigious borough/city in the greater Hyderabad area to live in. Economic Times estimated that properties in Banjara Hills were worth "a whopping Rs 96,000 crore", an equivalent to US$20.7 billion (As of 8 September 2011).

The much neglected Banjara Lake is also located here.

== History ==
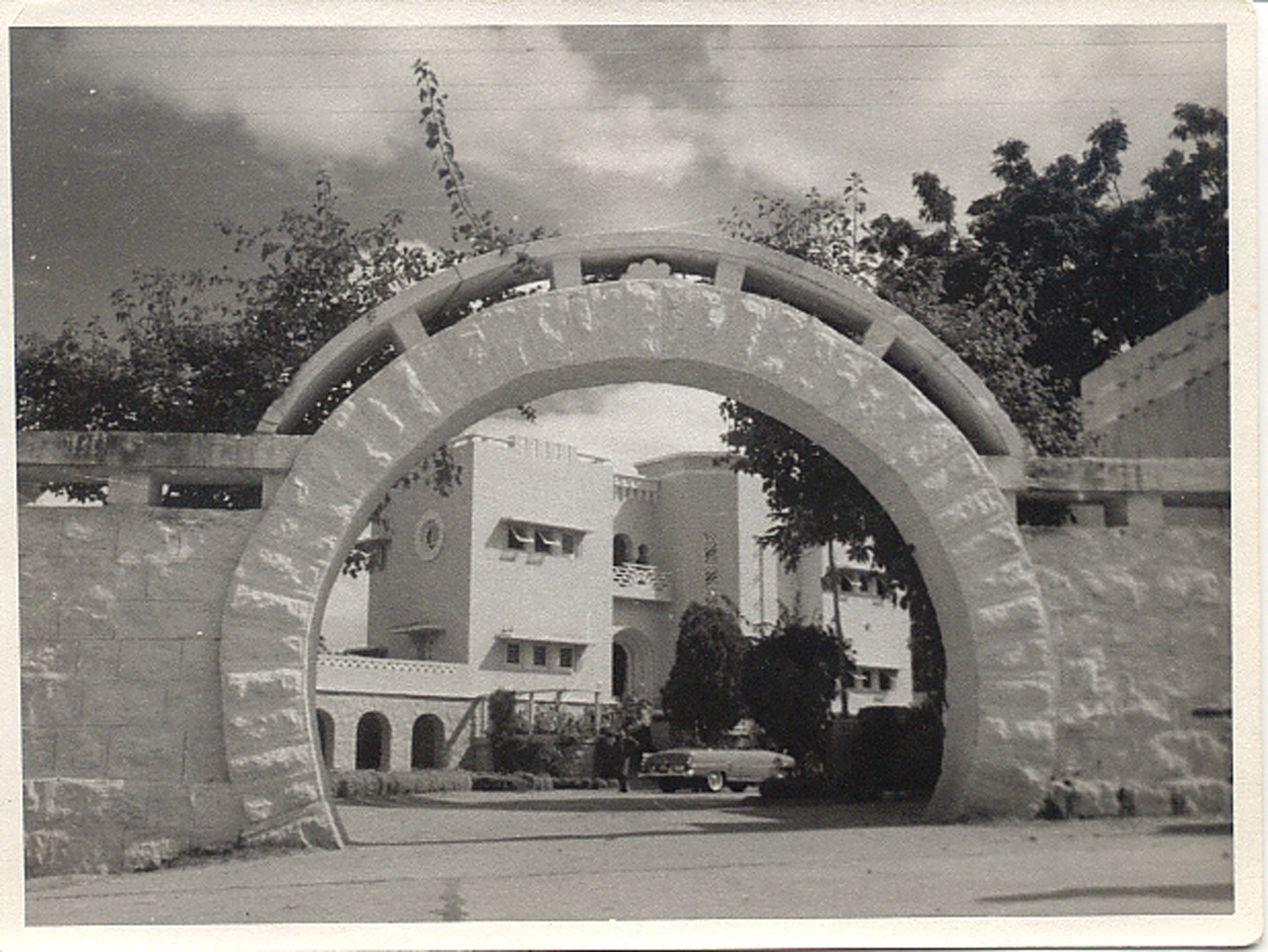
Alhambra, residence of architect Muhammad Fayyazuddin was located on Road number 10 at Banjara Hills. It was demolished in 1986–87

The land was first bought by Nawab Mehdi Nawaz Jung, a minister in the court of the last Nizam in 1927, who built his residence, Banjara Bhavan (supposedly inspired by Antoni Gaudí's works) here. The last Nizam suggested that the area be named after the Nawab, as the man responsible for its development. However, the Nawab stated that it would only be fair to name the area after its original inhabitants, the Banjaras.

The Banjara Bhavan was visited by Jawaharlal Nehru as well as Rabindranath Tagore, who wrote a poem inspired by the area.

Road No. 1 of Banjara Hills is now known as Mehdi Nawaz Jung Road, named in his honour.

== Landscape ==
Banjara Hills is famous for its hotels, upscale restaurants, banquet halls and large shopping malls. Taj Krishna, Taj Deccan, Park Hyatt Hyderabad, The leela, The Platinum Banquets @ Banjara and Taj Banjara are well-known star hotels & banquets in this area. The highest building in the Banjara Hills area is the commercial Laxmi Cyber Centre.

The Jalagam Vengal Rao Park is in Banjara Hills. This park is very beautiful, has its own charm, and many locals visit regularly for jogging and relaxing. Most of the businesses are concentrated on Road No.1 and Road No. 3. Muffakham Jah College of Engineering and Technology is on Road No. 3. This college has one of the largest campuses in the city. It works under the management and ownership of Sultan-ul-Uloom Education Society, which also operates Sultan-ul-Uloom College of Law, College of Education, Junior College, and School in the same premises. KBR park, named after Kasu Brahmananda Reddy, is close to Road No. 3. A cultural centre, called Lamakaan, opened on Road No. 1 in 2010. The 400-year-old, Svayambhu Sri Lakshmi Narasimha Swamy Temple on Road No. 12 is famous for Grand Harinam sankirtans. Guitarmonk school is also there.

== Hospitals ==
- L. V. Prasad Eye Institute
- Care Hospital

== Gallery ==
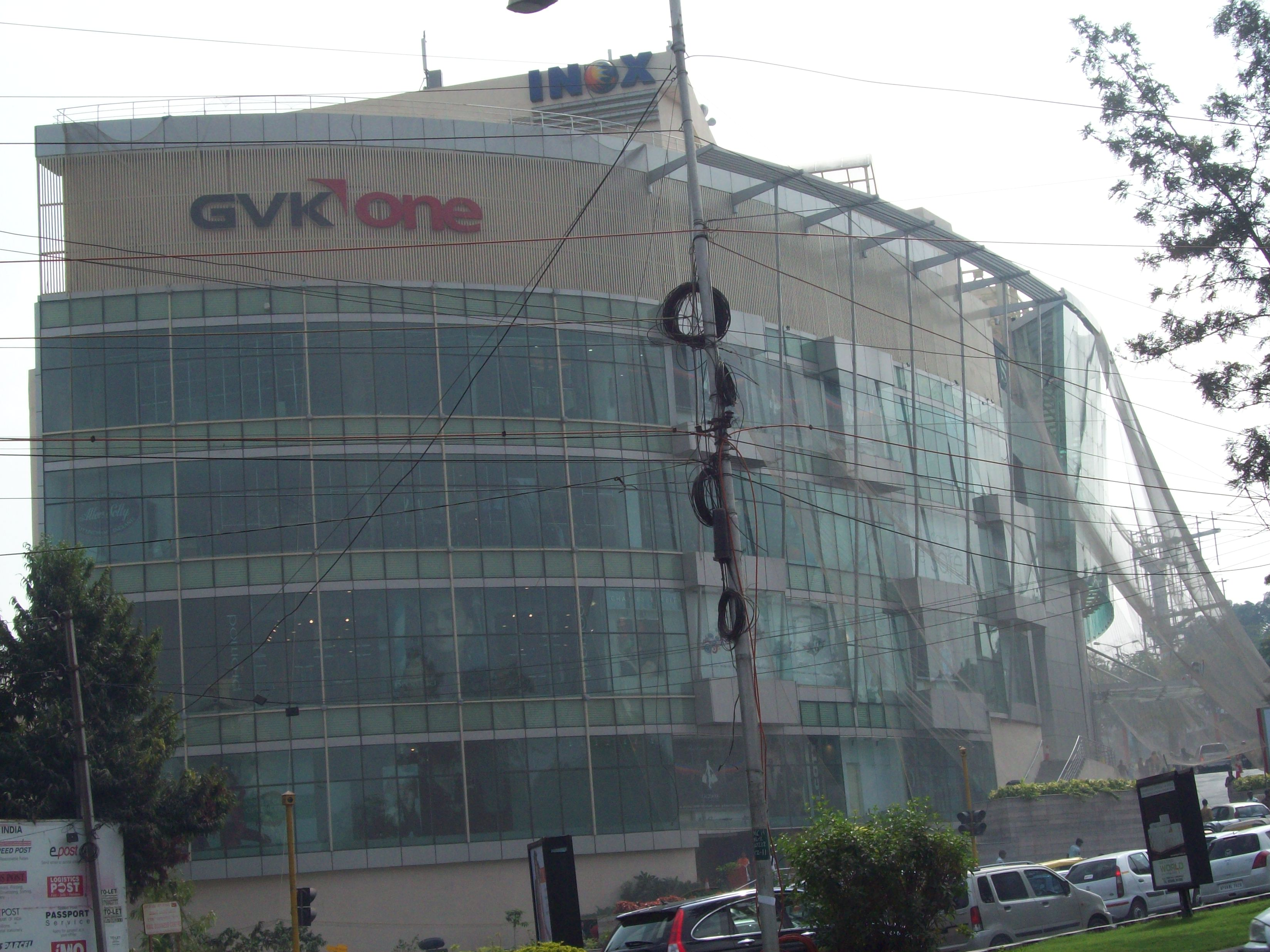
GVK Mall, Banjarahills, Hyderabad

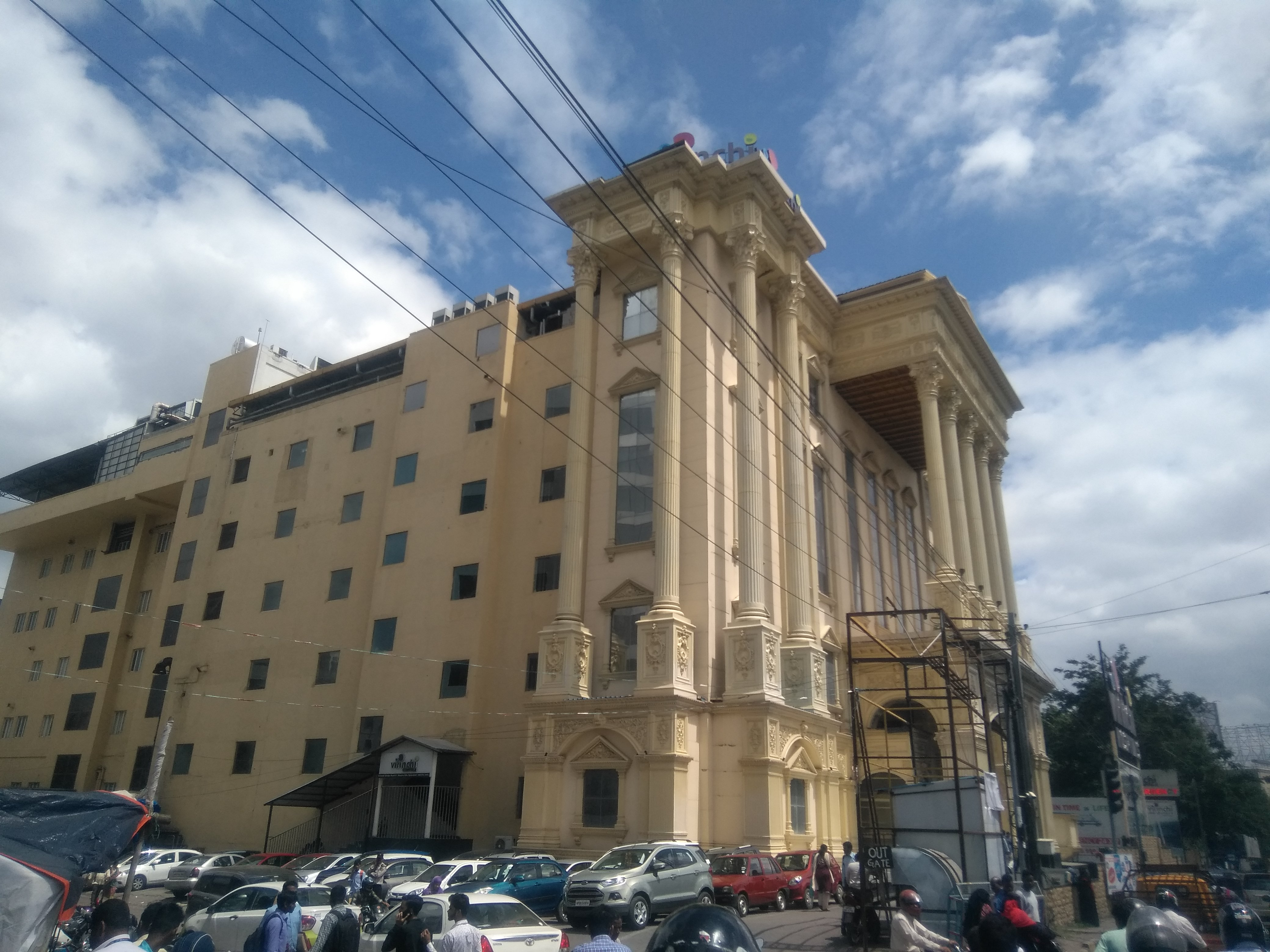
Virinchi hospital, Banjarahills, Hyderabad

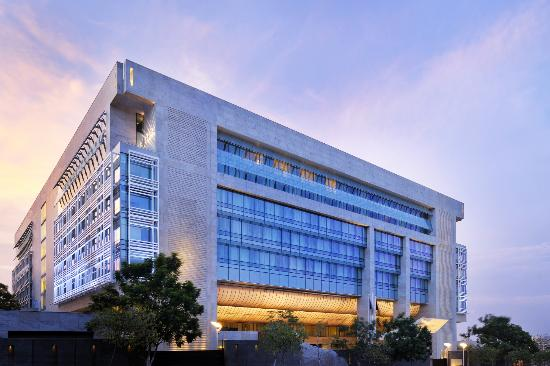
Park Hyatt Hyderabad

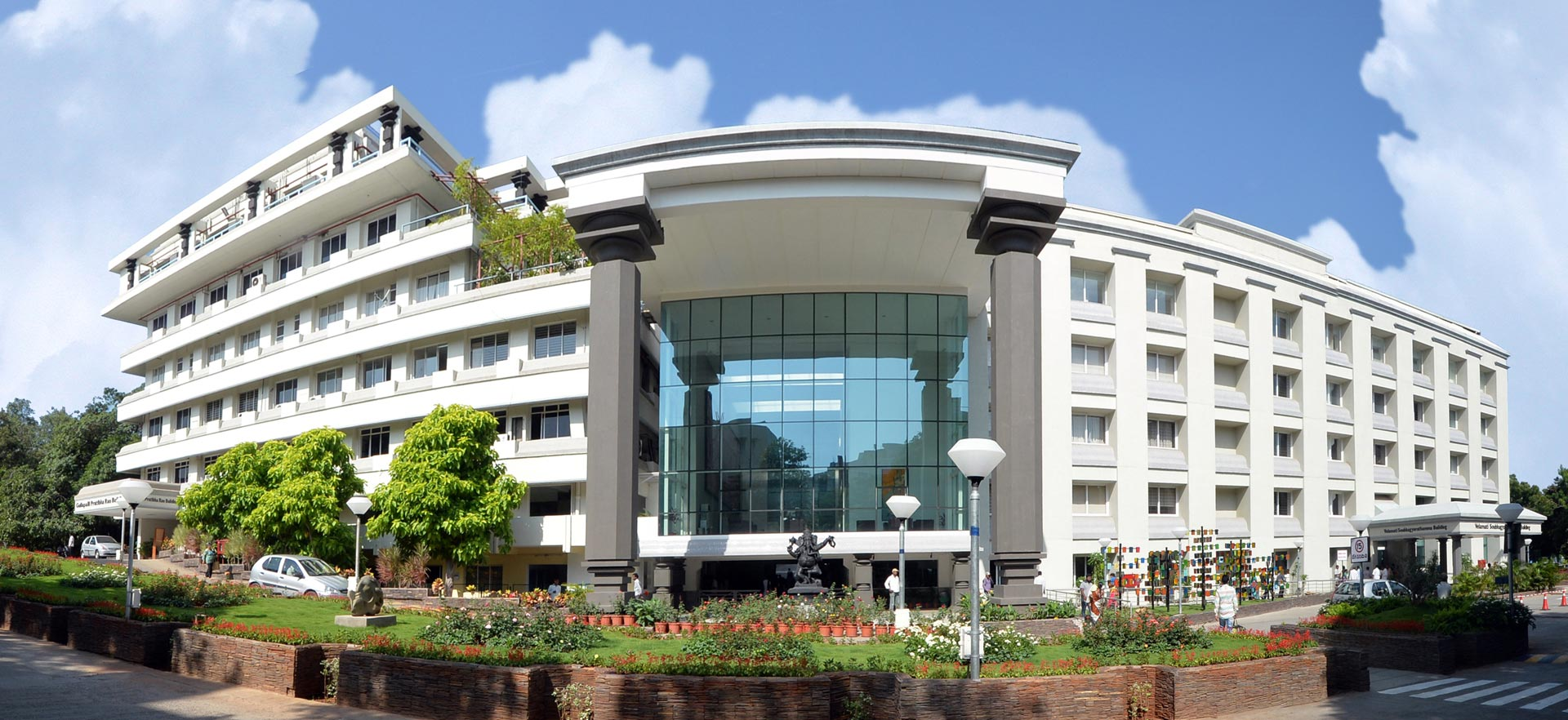
L. V. Prasad Eye Institute, Banjara Hills

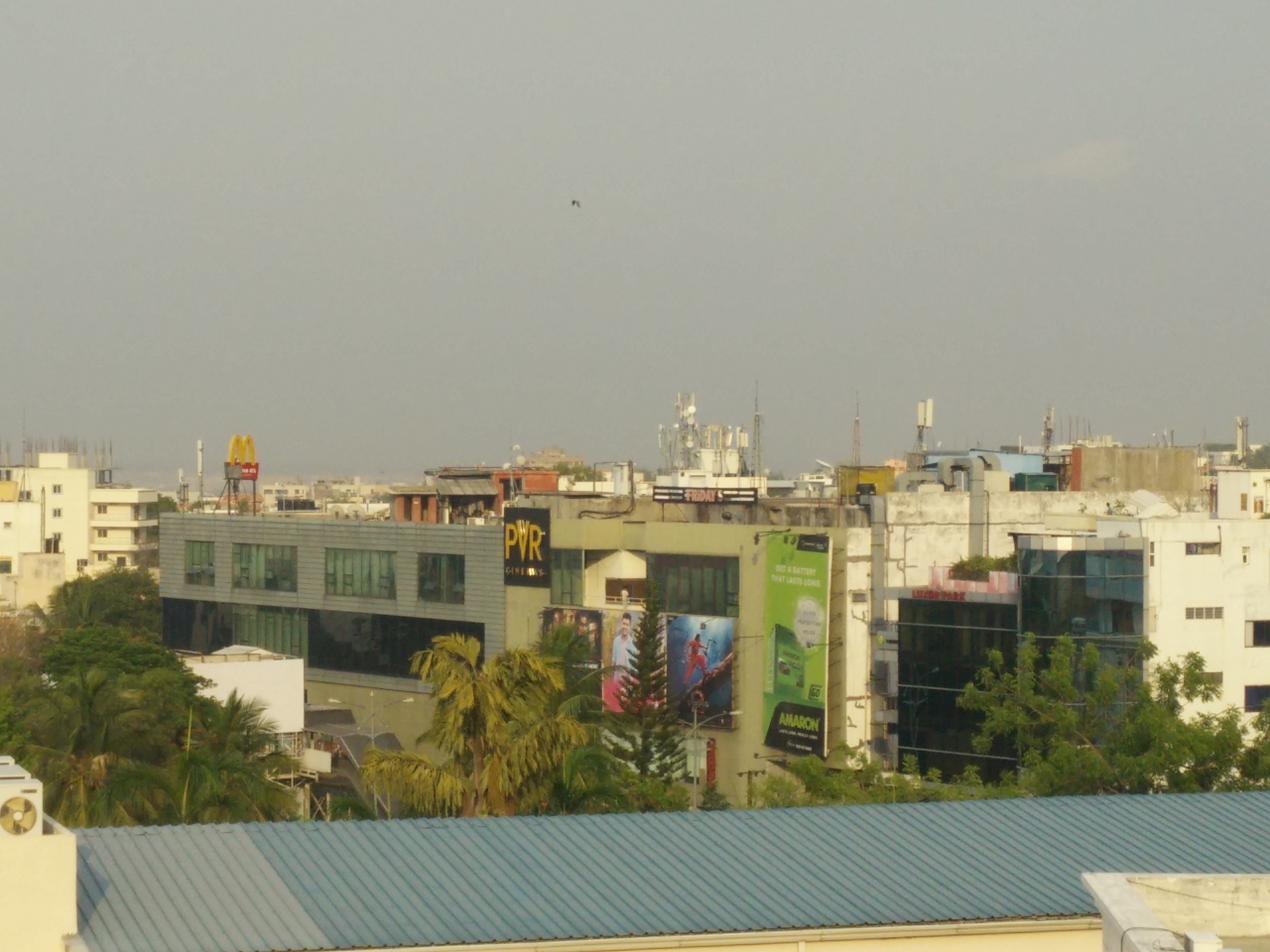
PVR Cinemas, Banjara Hills

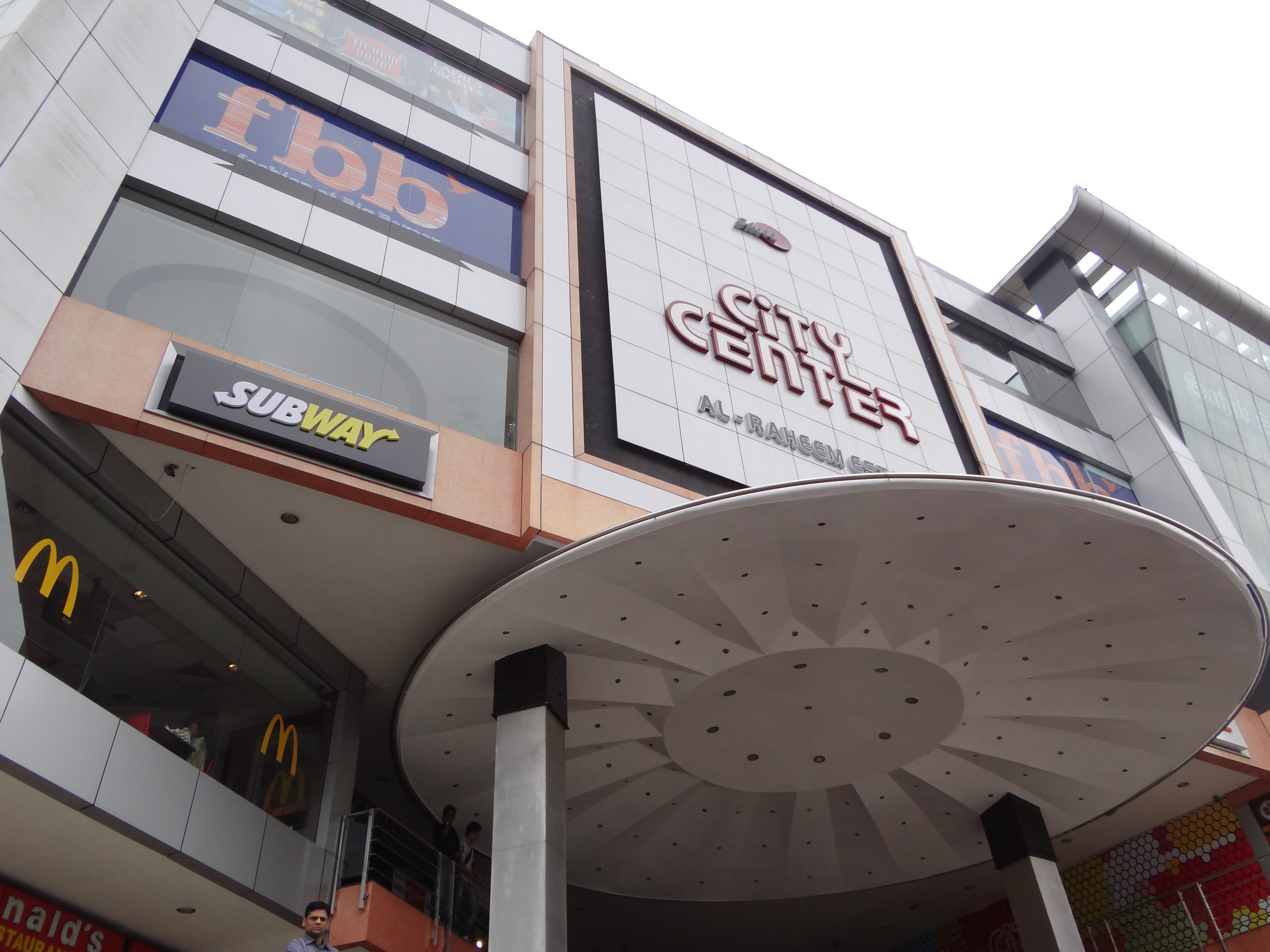
Hyderabad City Center entrance, Banjara hills

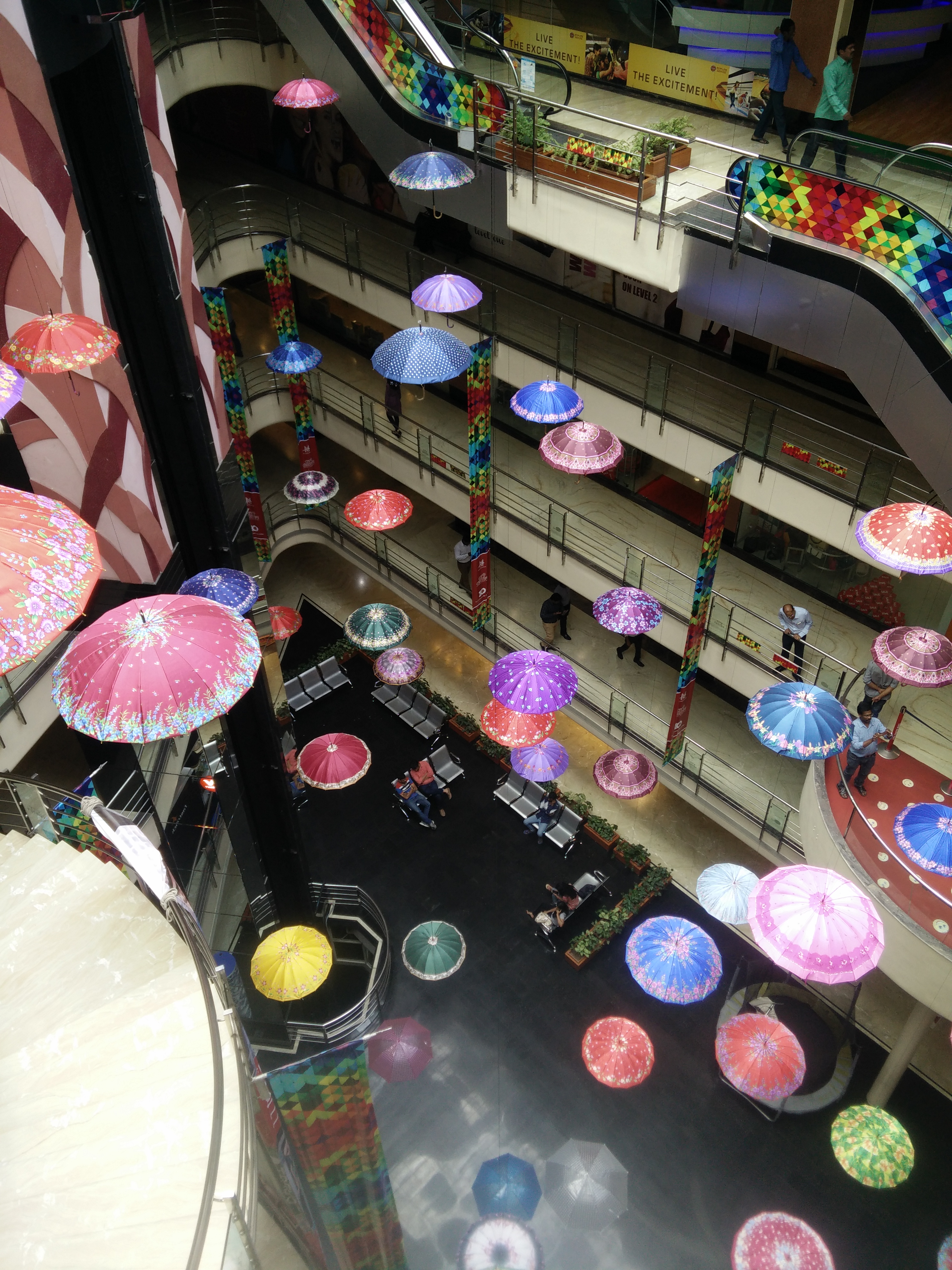
Hyderabad City Center, Banjara hills

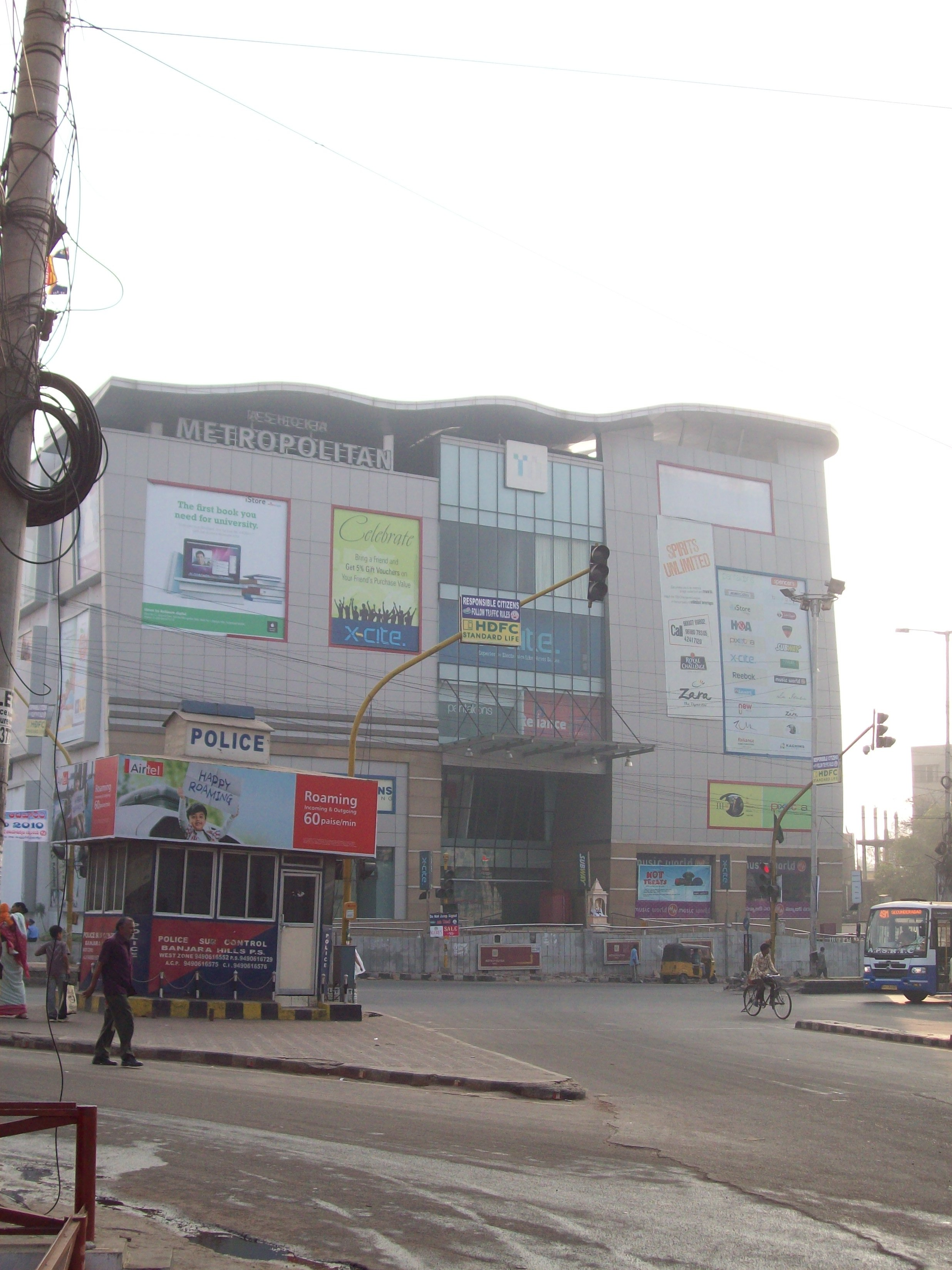
x-cite mall at Banjara Hills Hyderabad

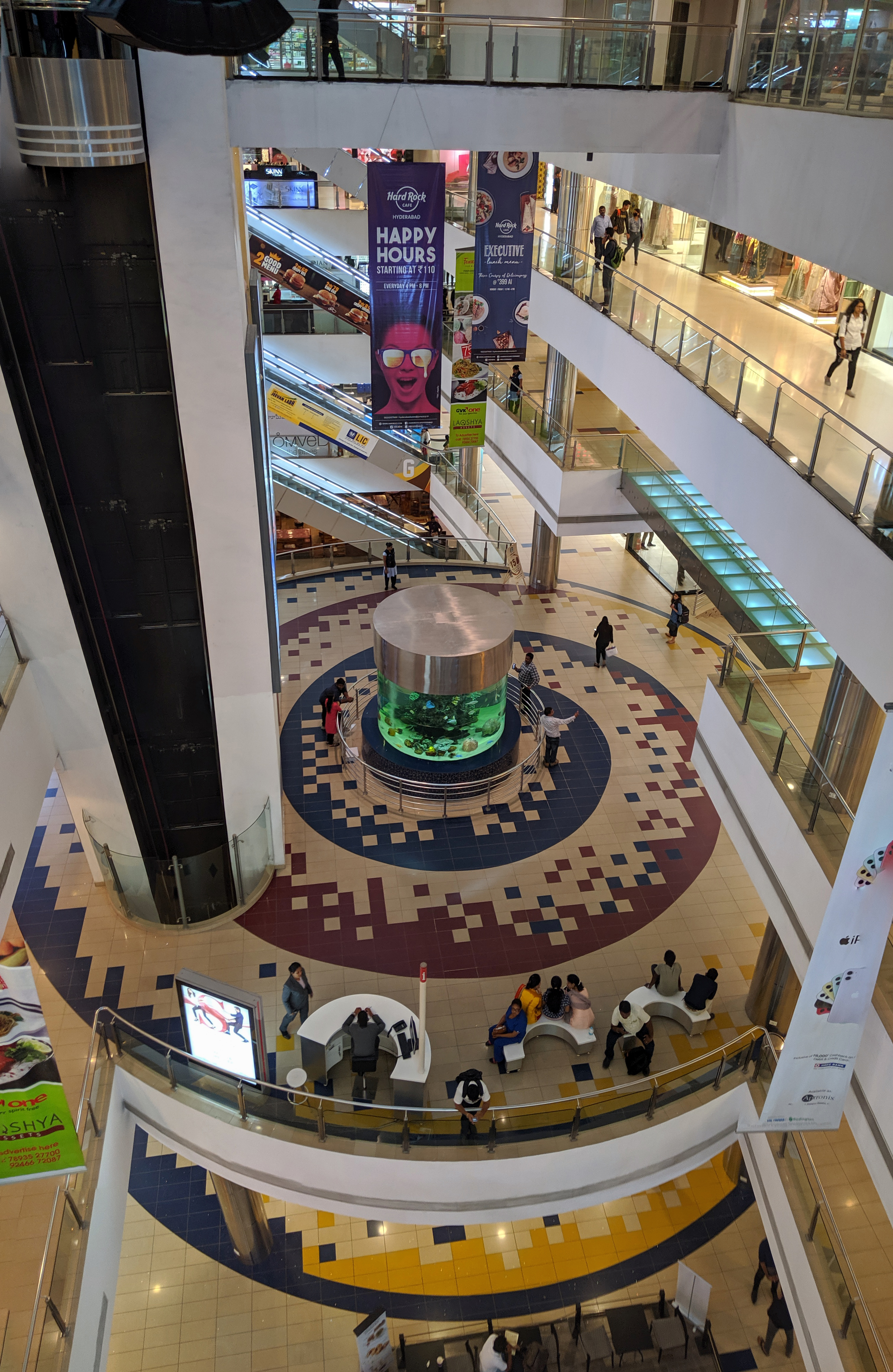
GVK One Hyderabad

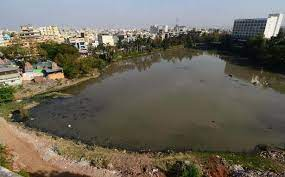
Banjara lake

== Transport ==
TSRTC connects Banjara hills to parts of Hyderabad like Dilsukhnagar, Koti, Ghatkesar, and Khairatabad. New flyovers have eased traffic congestion towards this suburb. The closest MMTS train station is at Khairatabad. This suburb has a good road network, with roads being renovated constantly to accommodate high traffic during peak hours.

== Localities ==
Somajiguda, Errammanzil Colony, Srinagar Colony, G.S Colony, Panjagutta and Jubilee Hills are nearby / adjacent areas.
