= Jalagam Prasada Rao =

Indian politician

Minister for Panchayat Raj
- In office 5 August 1991 – 1994

Minister for Small Scale Industries
- In office 1990 – 4 August 1991

Andhra Pradesh State Legislative Assembly

Assembly Member for Sathupalli
- In office 1983 - 1985; 1989 - 1994

Personal details
- Relations: Jalagam Venkat Rao (brother)
- Parent: Jalagam Vengala Rao (father)

Jalagam Prasada Rao is a former Indian Politician elected to Andhra Pradesh State Legislative Assembly from Sathupalli. He served as Panchayat Raj Minister during United Andhra Pradesh. He is the eldest son of former chief minister of united Andhra Pradesh, Jalagam Vengala Rao. He was elected to the Assembly from Sathupali constituency from Indian National Congress.

== Political career ==
He was elected to the Andhra Pradesh Legislative Assembly two times during the year 1983 and 1989 general elections from Sathupalli constituency. He served as Minister of Small Scale Industries and Panchayat Raj. He was elected from Indian National Congress.

Election Statistics
Year	Constituency	Votes	Result
1983	Sathupalli	52.19%	Won
1989	Sathupalli	48.69%	Won
1994	Sathupalli	46.25%	Lost
