= Jalagam Venkat Rao =

Indian politician

- జలగం వెంకట రావు

Member of Legislative Assembly
- In office 2014-2017
- Constituency: Kothagudem (Assembly constituency)

Member of Legislative Assembly
- In office 2004 - 2009
- Constituency: Sathupalli

Personal details
- Born: 18 April 1968 (age 58) Khammam, Telangana
- Party: Bharatiya Janata Party
- Other political affiliations: Bharat Rashtra Samithi; Indian National Congress; All India Forward Bloc
- Relations: Jalagam Prasada Rao (brother)
- Parent: Jalagam Vengala Rao (father)
- Occupation: Politician

Jalagam Venkat Rao (born 18 April 1967) is a former member of the legislative assembly representing Kothagudem Assembly constituency. He won the 2004 elections from Sathupalli constituency and 2014 elections from Kothagudem constituency.

== Early life ==
He was born to 5th Chief Minister of Andhra Pradesh, Jalagam Vengala Rao in Khammam, Khammam district. He has an elder brother, Jalagam Prasada Rao, a former minister. He studied towards his BS Computer science in the USA.

== Career ==
He was a technocrat and was running a software company in Hyderabad, VJ Info.

=== Political career ===
Jalagam Venkat Rao was a Member of the Legislative Assembly of Andhra Pradesh, representing the INC for the same constituency, Sathupalli (Assembly constituency), just as his father.

=== TRS ===
Jalagam Venkat Rao won as MLA from Kothagudem assembly constituency in 2014 general elections, the first and the only TRS legislator from the Khammam district. In 2018 Telangana Assembly Elections he contested as MLA from Kothagudem Assembly constituency representing the then Telangana Rashtra Samithi (TRS) and had lost to his Congress rival Vanama Venkateswara Rao. Venkata Rao challenged Venkateswara Rao's election on the ground that the latter had given misleading information in the affidavit and later filed a case in January 2019. The Telangana High Court, after four years of courtroom battle, held that Venkateswara Rao stood disqualified as Kothagudem MLA Tuesday, 25 July 2023.

=== BJP ===
Jalagam joined the Bharatiya Janata Party on 10 March 2024 in the presence of party's General Secretary and Telangana state incharge Tarun Chugh at central party headquarters in New Delhi ahead of 2024 Lok Sabha elections.
