= 2024 Indian general election in Telangana =

Indian political election in Telangana

- 13 May 2024

All 17 Telangana seats in the Lok Sabha
- Opinion polls
- Turnout: 66.30% (▲4.19%)
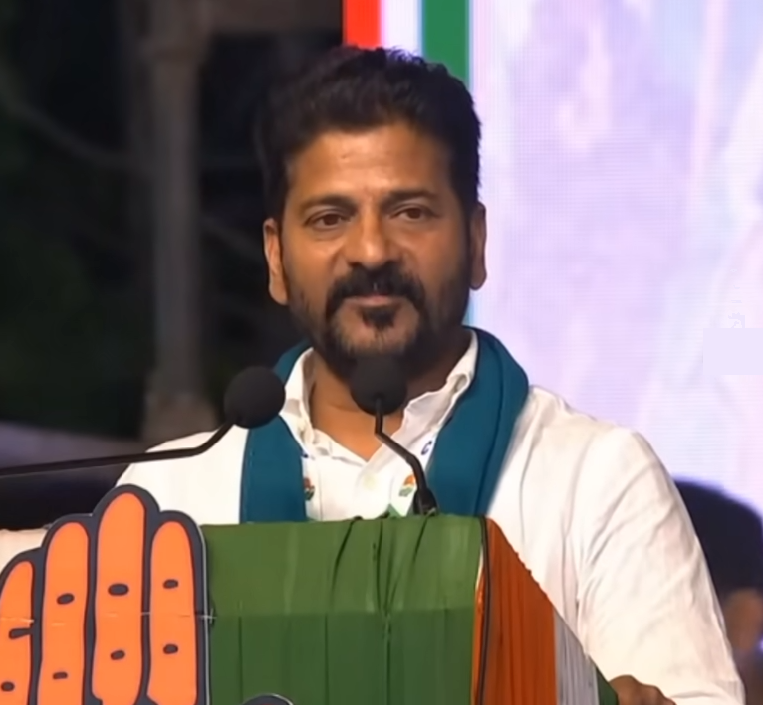

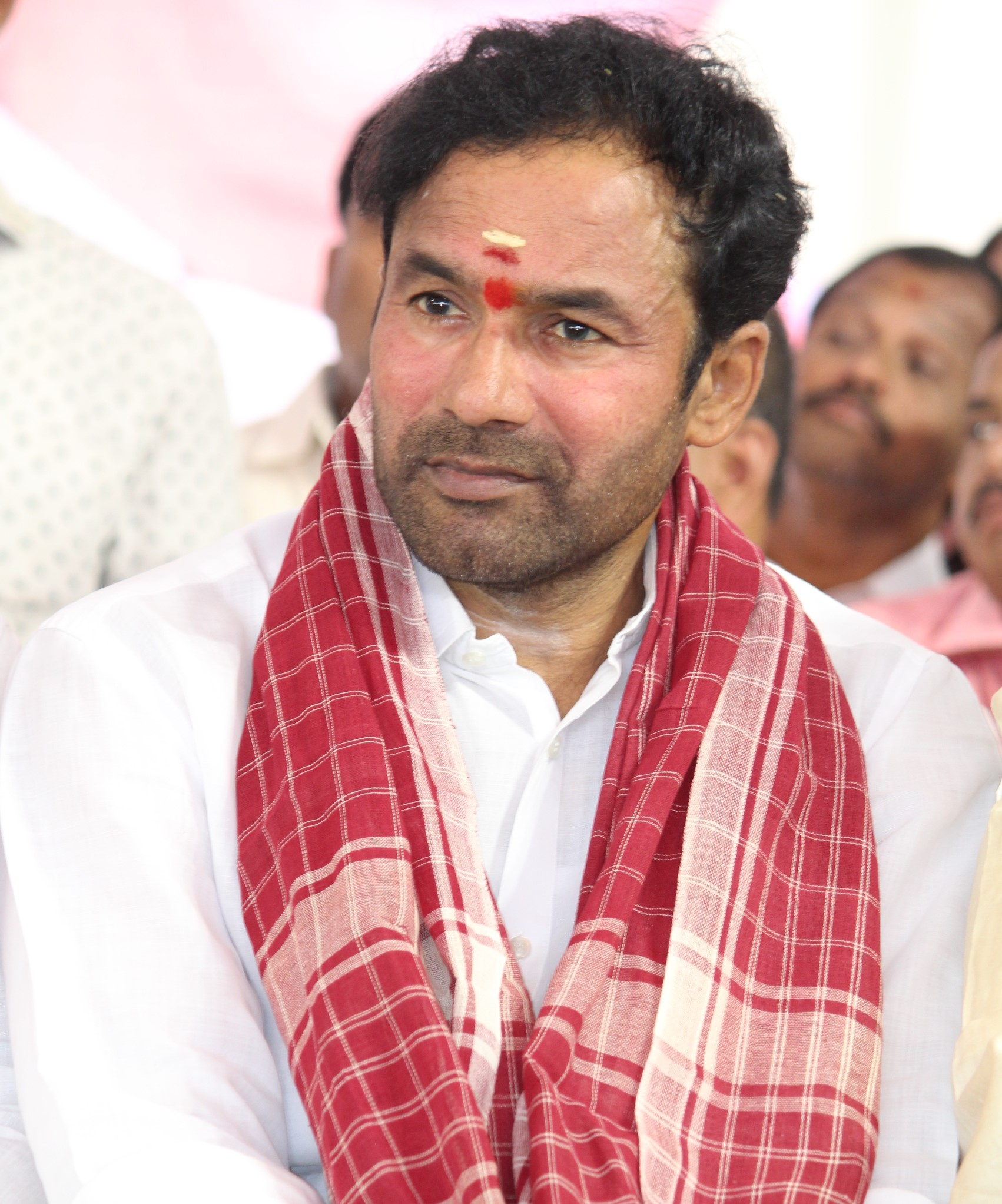

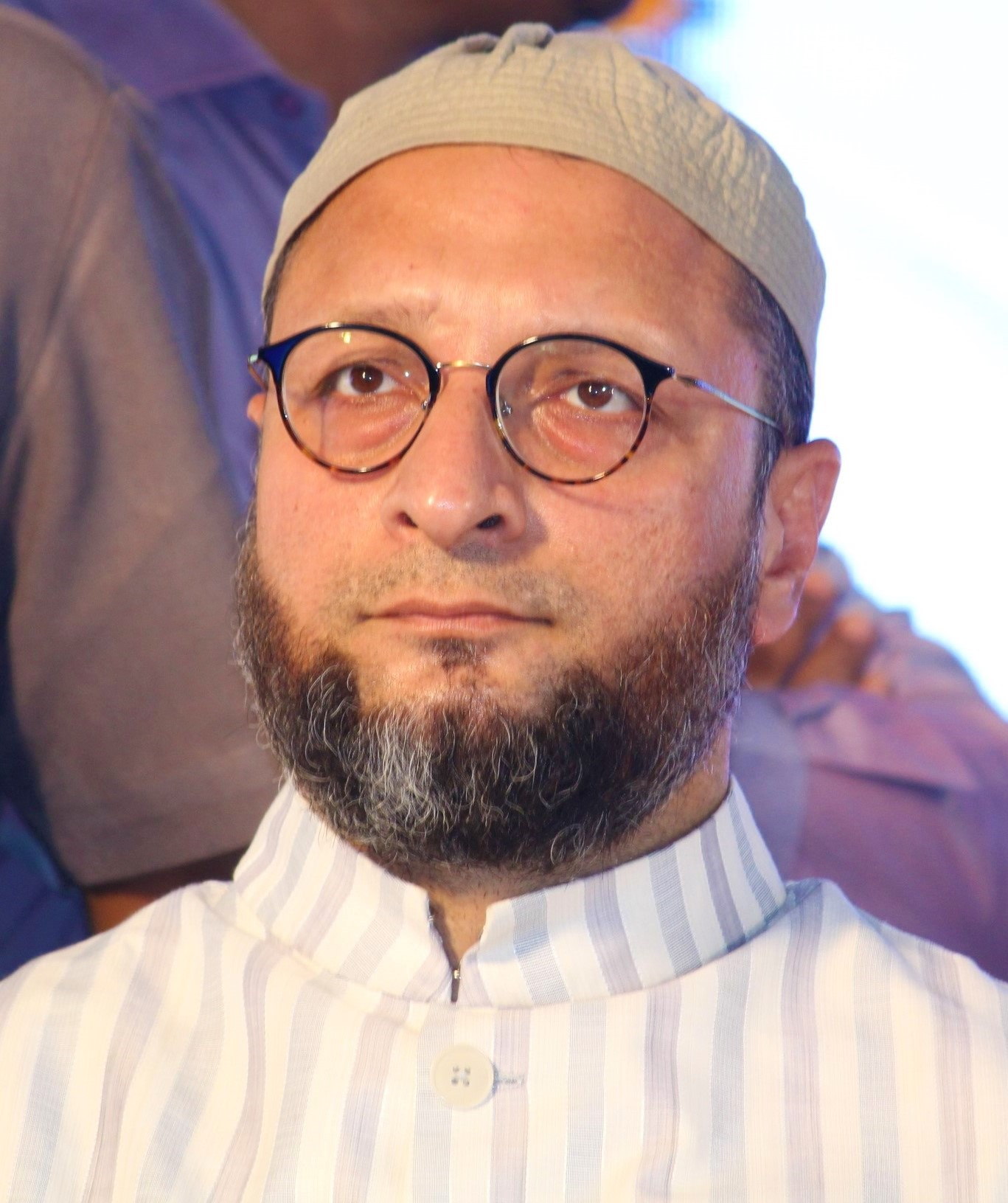

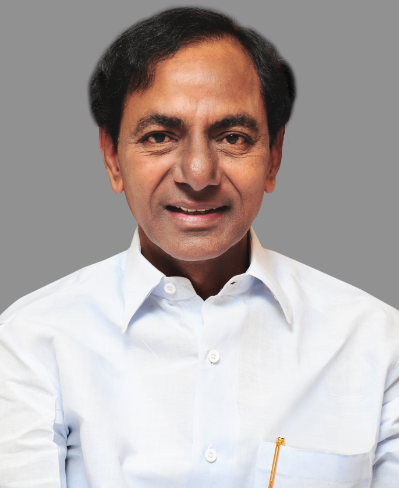
	First party	Second party
Leader	Revanth Reddy	G. Kishan Reddy
Party	INC	BJP
Alliance	INDIA	NDA
Leader's seat	Did not contest	Secunderabad (won)
Last election	29.79%, 3 seats	19.65%, 4 seats
Seats won	8	8
Seat change	▲5	▲4
Popular vote	88,24,961	77,43,947
Percentage	40.10%	35.19%
Swing	▲10.31pp	▲15.54pp
	Third party	Fourth party
Leader	Asaduddin Owaisi	K. Chandrashekar Rao
Party	AIMIM	BRS
Alliance	–	–
Leader's seat	Hyderabad (won)	Did not contest
Last election	2.78%, 1 seats	41.71%, 9 seats
Seats won	1	0
Seat change	Steady	▼9
Popular vote	6,59,278	36,37,086
Percentage	3.02%	16.68%
Swing	▲0.22pp	▼24.48pp
Prime Minister before election
Narendra Modi
BJP
Prime Minister after election
Narendra Modi
BJP

The 2024 Indian general election was held in Telangana on 13 May 2024 to elect 17 members of the 18th Lok Sabha. Voter turnout of 65.67% has been recorded.

The Bharatiya Janata Party and the Indian National Congress performed strongly in the elections, winning 8 seats each. The remaining seat was won by the AIMIM. The Bharat Rashtra Samiti, which had previously won 9 seats, was decimated and failed to win any seat.

== Election schedule ==
Poll event	Phase
Poll event	IV
Notification date	18 April 2024
Last date for filing nomination	25 April 2024
Scrutiny of nomination	26 April 2024
Last Date for withdrawal of nomination	29 April 2024
Date of poll	13 May 2024
Date of counting of votes/Result	4 June 2024
No. of constituencies	17

== Parties and alliances ==
Party	Flag	Symbol	Leader	Seats contested
Indian National Congress			Revanth Reddy	17
Bharatiya Janata Party			G Kishan Reddy	17
Bharat Rashtra Samithi			Nama Nageswara Rao	17
All India Majlis-e-Ittehadul Muslimeen			Asaduddin Owaisi	1
Communist Party of India (Marxist)			Tammineni Veerabhadram	1

== Candidates ==
Constituency							
Constituency		BRS		INDIA		NDA	
1	Adilabad (ST)	BRS	Atram Sakku	INC	Atram Suguna	BJP	G. Nagesh
2	Peddapalli (SC)	BRS	Koppula Eshwar	INC	Gaddam Vamsi Krishna	BJP	Gomasa Srinivas
3	Karimnagar	BRS	B. Vinod Kumar	INC	Velichala Rajender Rao	BJP	Bandi Sanjay Kumar
4	Nizamabad	BRS	Bajireddy Goverdhan	INC	T. Jeevan Reddy	BJP	Dharmapuri Arvind
5	Zahirabad	BRS	Gali Anil Kumar	INC	Suresh Kumar Shetkar	BJP	B. B. Patil
6	Medak	BRS	Parupati Venkatrama Reddy	INC	Neelam Madhu	BJP	Raghunandan Rao
7	Malkajgiri	BRS	Ragidi Laxma Reddy	INC	Patnam Sunitha Mahender Reddy	BJP	Etela Rajender
8	Secunderabad	BRS	T. Padma Rao Goud	INC	Danam Nagender	BJP	G. Kishan Reddy
9	Hyderabad	BRS	Gaddam Srinivas Yadav	INC	Mohammed Waliullah Sameer	BJP	Kompella Madhavi Latha
10	Chevella	BRS	Kasani Gnaneshwar Mudiraj	INC	G. Ranjith Reddy	BJP	Konda Vishweshwar Reddy
11	Mahabubnagar	BRS	Manne Srinivas Reddy	INC	Challa Vamshi Chand Reddy	BJP	D. K. Aruna
12	Nagarkurnool (SC)	BRS	R. S. Praveen Kumar	INC	Mallu Ravi	BJP	Pothuganti Bharath Prasad
13	Nalgonda	BRS	Kancharla Krishna Reddy	INC	Kunduru Raghuveer Reddy	BJP	Shanampudi Saidireddy
14	Bhuvanagiri	BRS	Kyama Mallesh	INC	Chamala Kiran Kumar Reddy	BJP	Boora Narsaiah Goud
15	Warangal (SC)	BRS	M. Sudheer Kumar	INC	Kadiyam Kavya	BJP	Aroori Ramesh
16	Mahabubabad (ST)	BRS	Kavitha Maloth	INC	Balram Naik	BJP	Azmeera Seetaram Naik
17	Khammam	BRS	Nama Nageswara Rao	INC	Ramasahayam Raghuram Reddy	BJP	Tandra Vinod Rao

== Voter turnout ==
Constituency		Poll date	Turnout	Swing
1	Adilabad (ST)	13 May 2024	74.03%	▲2.61
2	Peddapalli (SC)	13 May 2024	67.87%	▲2.28
3	Karimnagar	13 May 2024	72.54%	▲3.02
4	Nizamabad	13 May 2024	71.92%	▲3.48
5	Zahirabad	13 May 2024	74.63%	▲4.93
6	Medak	13 May 2024	75.09%	▲3.34
7	Malkajgiri	13 May 2024	50.78%	▲1.15
8	Secunderabad	13 May 2024	49.04%	▲2.54
9	Hyderabad	13 May 2024	48.48%	▲3.64
10	Chevella	13 May 2024	56.40%	▲3.15
11	Mahabubnagar	13 May 2024	72.43%	▲6.46
12	Nagarkurnool (SC)	13 May 2024	69.46%	▲7.23
13	Nalgonda	13 May 2024	74.02%	▼0.13
14	Bhuvanagiri	13 May 2024	76.78%	▲2.29
15	Warangal (SC)	13 May 2024	68.86%	▲5.16
16	Mahabubabad (ST)	13 May 2024	71.85%	▲2.79
17	Khammam	13 May 2024	76.09%	▲0.79
			65.67%	▲3.56

== Surveys and polls ==
=== Opinion polls ===
Polling agency	Date published	Margin of error					Lead
Polling agency	Date published	Margin of error	BRS	INDIA	NDA	Others	Lead
ABP News-CVoter	April 2024	±5%	1	10	5	1	INDIA
ABP News-CVoter	March 2024	±5%	3	10	4	1	INDIA
India Today-CVoter	February 2024	±3-5%	3	10	3	1	INDIA
ABP-CVoter	December 2023	±3-5%	3-5	9-11	1-3	1-2	INDIA
Times Now-ETG	December 2023	±3%	3-5	8-10	3-5	0-1	INDIA
India TV-CNX	October 2023	±3%	8	2	6	1	BRS
Times Now-ETG	September 2023	±3%	9-11	3-4	2-3	0-1	BRS
Times Now-ETG	August 2023	±3%	9-11	3-4	2-3	0-1	BRS
India Today-CVoter	August 2023	±3-5%	6	7	4	0	INDIA

Polling agency	Date published	Margin of error					Lead
Polling agency	Date published	Margin of error	BRS	INDIA	NDA	Others	Lead
ABP News-CVoter	April 2024	±5%	27%	42%	26%	5%	15
ABP News-CVoter	March 2024	±5%	28%	43%	25%	4%	15
India Today-CVoter	February 2024	±3-5%	29%	41%	21%	9%	12
India Today-CVoter	August 2023	±3-5%	37%	38%	23%	2%	1

=== Exit polls ===
Polling agency					Lead
Polling agency	INDIA	NDA	BRS	Others	Lead
TV9 Bharatvarsh- People's Insight - Polstrat	8	7		2	INDIA
Actual results	8	8	0	1	Tie

== Results ==
=== Results by alliance or party ===
Alliance/ Party		Popular vote			Seats		
Alliance/ Party		Votes	%	±pp	Contested	Won	+/−
INDIA	INC	88,24,961	40.10	▲10.31	17	8	▲5
NDA	BJP	77,43,947	35.19	▲15.54	17	8	▲4
BRS		36,57,237	16.62	▼25.09	17	0	▼9
AIMIM		6,61,981	3.01	▲0.21	1	1	Steady
Others		5,21,657	2.37	▼0.50		0	Steady
Independents		4,94,346	2.24	▼0.94	286	0	Steady
NOTA		1,04,244	0.47	▼0.56			
Total		2,20,08,373	100%	Steady		17	Steady
Votes Cast		2,20,08,373	66.26%				
Total Electors		3,32,16,348					

=== Results by constituency ===
Constituency			Winner				Runner Up				Margin	%
#	Name	Poll %	Candidate	Party	Votes	%	Candidate	Party	Votes	%	Margin	%
1	Adilabad (ST)	74.03▲	G. Nagesh	BJP	5,68,168	45.98	Atram Suguna	INC	4,77,516	38.65	90,652	7.33
2	Peddapalli (SC)	67.87▲	Gaddam Vamsi Krishna	INC	4,75,587	43.42	Gomasa Srinivas	BJP	3,44,223	31.43	1,31,364	11.99
3	Karimnagar	72.54▲	Bandi Sanjay Kumar	BJP	5,85,116	44.57	Velichala Rajender Rao	INC	3,59,907	27.41	2,25,209	17.16
4	Nizamabad	71.92▲	Dharmapuri Arvind	BJP	5,92,318	48.02	T. Jeevan Reddy	INC	4,83,077	39.16	1,09,241	8.86
5	Zahirabad	74.63▲	Suresh Kumar Shetkar	INC	5,28,418	42.73	B. B. Patil	BJP	4,82,230	39.00	46,188	3.73
6	Medak	75.09▲	Raghunandan Rao	BJP	4,71,217	33.99	Neelam Madhu	INC	4,32,078	31.17	39,139	2.22
7	Malkajgiri	50.78▲	Etela Rajender	BJP	9,91,042	51.25	P. Sunitha Mahender Reddy	INC	5,99,567	31.00	3,91,475	20.25
8	Secunderabad	49.04▲	G. Kishan Reddy	BJP	4,73,012	45.15	Danam Nagender	INC	4,23,068	40.38	49,944	4.77
9	Hyderabad	48.48▲	Asaduddin Owaisi	AIMIM	6,61,981	61.28	Kompella Madhavi Latha	BJP	3,23,894	29.98	3,38,087	31.30
10	Chevella	56.40▲	Konda Vishweshwar	BJP	8,09,882	48.34	G. Ranjith Reddy	INC	6,36,985	38.02	1,72,897	10.32
11	Mahabubnagar	71.85▲	D. K. Aruna	BJP	5,10,747	41.66	Challa Vamshi Chand Reddy	INC	5,06,247	41.29	4,500	0.37
12	Nagarkurnool (SC)	69.46▲	Mallu Ravi	INC	4,65,072	38.14	Pothuganti Bharath Prasad	BJP	3,70,658	30.40	94,414	7.74
13	Nalgonda	74.02▼	Kunduru Raghuveer	INC	7,84,337	60.50	Shanampudi Saidireddy	BJP	2,24,432	17.31	5,59,905	43.19
14	Bhongir	76.78▲	Chamala Kiran Kumar	INC	6,29,143	44.89	Boora Narsaiah Goud	BJP	4,06,973	29.04	2,22,170	15.85
15	Warangal (SC)	68.86▲	Kadiyam Kavya	INC	5,81,294	45.85	Aroori Ramesh	BJP	3,60,955	28.47	2,20,339	17.38
16	Mahabubabad (ST)	71.85▲	Balram Naik	INC	6,12,774	55.27	Kavitha Maloth	BRS	2,63,609	23.77	3,49,165	31.50
17	Khammam	76.09▲	R. Raghuram Reddy	INC	7,66,929	61.29	Nama Nageswara Rao	BRS	2,99,082	23.90	4,67,847	37.39

== Assembly segments wise lead of Parties ==
2024 Telangana Lok Sabha Elections Assembly Wise Map

Party	Assembly segments	Position in the Assembly (as of 2023 election)
Indian National Congress	64	64
Bharatiya Janata Party	46	8
Bharat Rashtra Samithi	3	39
All India Majlis-e-Ittehadul Muslimeen	6	7
Communist Party of India	0	1
Total	119	

== Assembly Segment wise leads ==
Constituency		Winner				Runner-up				Margin
#	Name	Candidate	Party	Votes	%	Candidate	Party	Votes	%	Margin
Adilabad Lok Sabha constituency
1	Sirpur	Godam Nagesh	BJP	71,325	43.51	Athram Suguna	INC	62,956	38.40	8,369
5	Asifabad	Athram Suguna	INC	73,996	43.14	Godam Nagesh	BJP	47,056	27.43	26,940
6	Khanapur	Godam Nagesh	BJP	75,106	46.33	Athram Suguna	INC	61,587	37.99	13,519
7	Adilabad	Godam Nagesh	BJP	82,394	45.48	Athram Suguna	INC	77,056	42.53	5,338
8	Boath	Godam Nagesh	BJP	70,118	42.40	Athram Suguna	INC	65,204	39.48	4,914
9	Nirmal	Godam Nagesh	BJP	1,07,603	58.11	Athram Suguna	INC	64,033	34.58	43,570
10	Mudhole	Godam Nagesh	BJP	1,05,334	54.70	Athram Suguna	INC	67,501	35.05	37,833
Peddapalli Lok Sabha constituency
2	Chennur	Vamsi Krishna Gaddam	INC	59,489	45.80	Srinivas Gomase	BJP	33,775	25.43	25,714
3	Bellampalli	Vamsi Krishna Gaddam	INC	57,157	45.63	Srinivas Gomase	BJP	32,577	26.00	24,580
4	Mancherial	Vamsi Krishna Gaddam	INC	79,101	46.64	Srinivas Gomase	BJP	59,716	35.21	19,385
22	Dharmapuri	Srinivas Gomase	BJP	66,211	39.12	Vamsi Krishna Gaddam	INC	57,633	34.04	8,578
23	Ramagundam	Vamsi Krishna Gaddam	INC	55,472	40.99	Srinivas Gomase	BJP	45,341	33.50	10,131
24	Manthani	Vamsi Krishna Gaddam	INC	87,237	52.00	Koppula Eshwar	BRS	34,156	20.30	53,081
25	Peddapalle	Vamsi Krishna Gaddam	INC	74,091	40.52	Srinivas Gomase	BJP	68,766	37.61	5,325
Karimnagar Lok Sabha constituency
26	Karimnagar	Bandi Sanjay Kumar	BJP	1,23,127	55.63	Velchala Rajender Rao	INC	63,755	28.80	59,372
27	Choppadandi	Bandi Sanjay Kumar	BJP	94,992	54.14	Velchala Rajender Rao	INC	41,983	23.92	53,009
28	Vemulawada	Bandi Sanjay Kumar	BJP	81,714	48.71	B. Vinod Kumar	BRS	38,142	22.73	43,572
29	Sircilla	Bandi Sanjay Kumar	BJP	72,559	39.25	B. Vinod Kumar	BRS	65,811	35.06	6,748
30	Manakondur	Bandi Sanjay Kumar	BJP	77,282	44.28	Velchala Rajender Rao	INC	52,769	30.23	24,513
31	Huzurabad	Bandi Sanjay Kumar	BJP	73,280	40.27	Velchala Rajender Rao	INC	50,306	27.44	22,974
32	Husnabad	Velchala Rajender Rao	INC	79,001	41.58	Bandi Sanjay Kumar	BJP	55,873	29.41	23,128
Nizamabad Lok Sabha constituency
11	Armur	Arvind Dharmapuri	BJP	83,668	53.92	T. Jeevan Reddy	INC	54,999	35.44	28,669
12	Bodhan	T. Jeevan Reddy	INC	82,666	50.59	Arvind Dharmapuri	BJP	69,472	42.52	14,194
17	Nizamabad Urban	T. Jeevan Reddy	INC	96,640	51.36	Arvind Dharmapuri	BJP	80,831	42.05	15,809
18	Nizamabad Rural	Arvind Dharmapuri	BJP	1,01,474	53.05	T. Jeevan Reddy	INC	56,674	29.63	44,800
19	Balkonda	Arvind Dharmapuri	BJP	85,845	50.63	T. Jeevan Reddy	INC	53,673	31.65	32,172
20	Koratla	Arvind Dharmapuri	BJP	92,656	51.22	T. Jeevan Reddy	INC	59,704	33.00	32,952
21	Jagtial	T. Jeevan Reddy	INC	76,145	43.55	Arvind Dharmapuri	BJP	74,298	42.49	1,847
Zahirabad Lok Sabha constituency
13	Jukkal	Suresh Kumar Shetkar	INC	63,577	41.41	B. B. Patil	BJP	61,832	40.27	1,745
14	Banswada	Suresh Kumar Shetkar	INC	66,348	43.89	B. B. Patil	BJP	57,459	38.01	8,889
15	Yellareddy	B. B. Patil	BJP	79,335	45.87	Suresh Kumar Shetkar	INC	63,446	36.68	15,889
16	Kamareddy	B. B. Patil	BJP	85,610	46.95	Suresh Kumar Shetkar	INC	66,527	36.48	19,083
35	Narayankhed	Suresh Kumar Shetkar	INC	78,280	45.37	B. B. Patil	BJP	58,018	33.63	20,262
36	Andole	Suresh Kumar Shetkar	INC	82,612	43.18	B. B. Patil	BJP	66,118	34.55	16,494
38	Zahirabad	Suresh Kumar Shetkar	INC	1,03,129	51.41	B. B. Patil	BJP	67,651	33.72	35,478
Medak Lok Sabha constituency
33	Siddipet	P. Venkatarami Reddy	BRS	65,195	37.57	Raghunandan Rao	BJP	62,823	35.90	2,372
34	Medak	Raghunandan Rao	BJP	67,374	38.40	Neelam Madhu	INC	55,588	31.15	11,786
37	Narsapur	Neelam Madhu	INC	72,376	37.83	P. Venkatarami Reddy	BRS	54,372	28.41	18,004
39	Sangareddy	Neelam Madhu	INC	75,287	41.86	Raghunandan Rao	BJP	70,310	39.10	4,977
40	Patancheru	Raghunandan Rao	BJP	1,03,775	39.78	Neelam Madhu	INC	94,294	36.14	9,481
41	Dubbak	P. Venkatarami Reddy	BRS	66,714	40.44	Raghunandan Rao	BJP	50,873	30.84	15,841
42	Gajwel	P. Venkatarami Reddy	BRS	85,432	37.99	Neelam Madhu	INC	65,539	29.14	19,893
Malkajgiri Lok Sabha constituency
43	Medchal	Etela Rajender	BJP	1,88,370	48.91	Patnam Sunitha Reddy	INC	1,19,125	30.90	69,245
44	Malkajgiri	Etela Rajender	BJP	1,39,479	52.81	Patnam Sunitha Reddy	INC	77,929	29.51	61,550
45	Quthbullapur	Etela Rajender	BJP	1,77,122	48.66	Patnam Sunitha Reddy	INC	1,20,957	33.23	56,165
46	Kukatpally	Etela Rajender	BJP	1,09,820	46.98	Patnam Sunitha Reddy	INC	84,700	36.23	25,120
47	Uppal	Etela Rajender	BJP	1,30,105	49.72	Patnam Sunitha Reddy	INC	76,870	29.15	53,235
49	Lal Bahadur Nagar	Etela Rajender	BJP	1,71,683	61.36	Patnam Sunitha Reddy	INC	68,095	24.33	1,03,588
71	Secunderabad Cantonment	Etela Rajender	BJP	64,133	48.98	Patnam Sunitha Reddy	INC	45,661	34.87	19,272
Secunderabad Lok Sabha constituency
57	Musheerabad	G. Kishan Reddy	BJP	77,116	49.38	Danam Nagender	INC	49,435	32.89	27,681
59	Amberpet	G. Kishan Reddy	BJP	83,048	57.43	Danam Nagender	INC	41,393	28.62	41,655
60	Khairatabad	G. Kishan Reddy	BJP	73,664	48.92	Danam Nagender	INC	57,124	37.94	16,540
61	Jubilee Hills	Danam Nagender	INC	89,705	50.83	G. Kishan Reddy	BJP	64,673	36.64	25,032
66	Sanathnagar	G. Kishan Reddy	BJP	66,849	53.07	Danam Nagender	INC	34,503	27.53	32,346
67	Nampally	Danam Nagender	INC	1,03,155	67.91	G. Kishan Reddy	BJP	40,243	26.49	62,912
68	Secunderabad	G. Kishan Reddy	BJP	62,538	44.74	Danam Nagender	INC	44,905	32.12	17,633
Hyderabad Lok Sabha constituency
58	Malakpet	Asaduddin Owaisi	AIMIM	76,318	56.19	Madhavi Latha	BJP	44,928	33.08	31,390
64	Karwan	Asaduddin Owaisi	AIMIM	1,08,389	58.37	Madhavi Latha	BJP	59,315	31.94	49,074
65	Goshamahal	Madhavi Latha	BJP	98,649	65.67	Asaduddin Owaisi	AIMIM	37,131	24.71	61,518
66	Charminar	Asaduddin Owaisi	AIMIM	70,799	63.34	Madhavi Latha	BJP	34,112	30.51	36,687
67	Chandrayangutta	Asaduddin Owaisi	AIMIM	1,28,103	74.55	Madhavi Latha	BJP	29,248	17.02	98,855
68	Yakutpura	Asaduddin Owaisi	AIMIM	1,06,122	67.82	Madhavi Latha	BJP	37,435	23.92	68,687
69	Bahadurpura	Asaduddin Owaisi	AIMIM	1,32,416	81.13	Madhavi Latha	BJP	16,794	10.29	1,15,622
Chevella Lok Sabha constituency
50	Maheshwaram	Konda Vishweshwar Reddy	BJP	1,49,527	51.18	G. Ranjith Reddy	INC	99,175	33.79	50,352
51	Rajendranagar	Konda Vishweshwar Reddy	BJP	1,57,701	47.76	G. Ranjith Reddy	INC	1,38,495	41.95	19,206
52	Serilingampally	Konda Vishweshwar Reddy	BJP	1,78,249	53.55	G. Ranjith Reddy	INC	1,04,472	31.38	73,777
53	Chevella	Konda Vishweshwar Reddy	BJP	93,778	48.41	G. Ranjith Reddy	INC	71,678	37.00	22,100
54	Pargi	Konda Vishweshwar Reddy	BJP	74,024	41.45	G. Ranjith Reddy	INC	71,816	40.22	2,208
55	Vikarabad	G. Ranjith Reddy	INC	75,361	46.18	Konda Vishweshwar Reddy	BJP	67,584	41.41	7,777
56	Tandur	Konda Vishweshwar Reddy	BJP	77,654	47.42	G. Ranjith Reddy	INC	69,864	42.66	7,790
Mahabubnagar Lok Sabha constituency
72	Kodangal	Challa Vamshi Chand Reddy	INC	84,414	49.14	D. K. Aruna	BJP	62,560	36.41	21,854
73	Narayanpet	D. K. Aruna	BJP	77,046	47.11	Challa Vamshi Chand Reddy	INC	57,162	34.95	19,884
74	Mahbubnagar	D. K. Aruna	BJP	80,874	47.06	Challa Vamshi Chand Reddy	INC	73,273	42.64	7,601
75	Jadcherla	Challa Vamshi Chand Reddy	INC	71,518	41.18	D. K. Aruna	BJP	66,639	38.20	4,879
76	Devarkadra	D. K. Aruna	BJP	72,538	40.61	Challa Vamshi Chand Reddy	INC	70,728	39.59	1,810
77	Makthal	D. K. Aruna	BJP	78,994	45.61	Challa Vamshi Chand Reddy	INC	69,916	39.97	9,078
84	Shadnagar	Challa Vamshi Chand Reddy	INC	76,100	41.22	D. K. Aruna	BJP	68,096	36.89	8,004
Nagarkurnool Lok Sabha constituency
78	Wanaparthy	Mallu Ravi	INC	67,214	36.81	Pothuganti Bharat	BJP	62,987	34.50	4,227
79	Gadwal	Pothuganti Bharat	BJP	78,869	41.01	Mallu Ravi	INC	59,238	30.80	19,638
80	Alampur	Mallu Ravi	INC	59,790	33.63	Pothuganti Bharat	BJP	55,053	30.96	4,727
81	Nagarkurnool	Mallu Ravi	INC	54,047	33.69	Pothuganti Bharat	BJP	51,482	32.09	2,565
82	Achampet	Mallu Ravi	INC	77,870	48.27	R. S. Praveen Kumar	BRS	40,006	24.80	37,864
83	Kalwakurthy	Mallu Ravi	INC	63,720	35.96	R. S. Praveen Kumar	BRS	51,893	29.28	11,827
85	Kollapur	Mallu Ravi	INC	77,380	49.62	R. S. Praveen Kumar	BRS	38,291	24.55	39,089
Nalgonda Lok Sabha constituency
86	Devarakonda	Kunduru Raghuveer	INC	1,00,079	54.00	Kancharla Krishna Reddy	BRS	41,400	22.34	58,679
87	Nagarjuna Sagar	Kunduru Raghuveer	INC	1,07,092	60.78	Kancharla Krishna Reddy	BRS	32,002	18.16	75,090
88	Miryalaguda	Kunduru Raghuveer	INC	99,490	57.39	Shanampudi Saidireddy	BJP	36,511	21.06	62,979
89	Huzurnagar	Kunduru Raghuveer	INC	1,33,200	69.39	Kancharla Krishna Reddy	BRS	27,781	14.47	1,05,419
90	Kodad	Kunduru Raghuveer	INC	1,24,500	67.51	Kancharla Krishna Reddy	BRS	28,763	15.59	95,737
91	Suryapet	Kunduru Raghuveer	INC	1,03,273	57.89	Kancharla Krishna Reddy	BRS	33,953	19.03	69,320
92	Nalgonda	Kunduru Raghuveer	INC	1,04,630	55.78	Shanampudi Saidireddy	BJP	51,451	27.43	53,179
Bhongir Lok Sabha constituency
48	Ibrahimpatnam	Chamala Kiran Kumar Reddy	INC	88,013	38.97	Boora Narsaiah Goud	BJP	84,044	37.21	3,969
93	Munugode	Chamala Kiran Kumar Reddy	INC	1,08,667	50.56	Boora Narsaiah Goud	BJP	54,961	25.57	53,706
94	Bhongir	Chamala Kiran Kumar Reddy	INC	74,319	40.85	Boora Narsaiah Goud	BJP	64,046	35.20	10,273
95	Nakrekal	Chamala Kiran Kumar Reddy	INC	96,914	49.70	Boora Narsaiah Goud	BJP	59,231	30.37	37,683
96	Thungathurthi	Chamala Kiran Kumar Reddy	INC	1,03,087	53.86	Kyama Mallesh	BRS	39,678	20.73	63,409
97	Alair	Chamala Kiran Kumar Reddy	INC	76,730	39.49	Boora Narsaiah Goud	BJP	61,470	31.61	15,260
98	Jangaon	Chamala Kiran Kumar Reddy	INC	76,032	42.09	Boora Narsaiah Goud	BJP	44,797	24.80	31,235
Warangal Lok Sabha constituency
99	Ghanpur Station	Kadiyam Kavya	INC	98,145	49.07	M. Sudheer Kumar	BRS	43,720	21.86	54,425
100	Palakurthi	Kadiyam Kavya	INC	87,293	47.82	M. Sudheer Kumar	BRS	47,878	26.23	39,415
104	Parkal	Kadiyam Kavya	INC	76,400	49.07	Aroori Ramesh	BJP	44,841	26.23	31,559
105	Warangal West	Kadiyam Kavya	INC	63,400	42.45	Aroori Ramesh	BJP	60,611	40.59	2,789
106	Warangal East	Aroori Ramesh	BJP	74,581	44.32	Kadiyam Kavya	INC	66,627	39.50	7,954
107	Waradhanapet	Kadiyam Kavya	INC	94,238	47.64	Aroori Ramesh	BJP	57,427	29.03	36,811
108	Bhupalpalle	Kadiyam Kavya	INC	89,463	47.60	Aroori Ramesh	BJP	49,631	26.40	39,832
Mahabubabad Lok Sabha constituency
101	Dornakal	Balram Naik	INC	95,306	56.70	Kavitha Maloth	BRS	50,293	29.92	45,013
102	Mahabubabad	Balram Naik	INC	1,02,011	55.31	Kavitha Maloth	BRS	52,128	28.26	49,883
103	Narsampet	Balram Naik	INC	1,00,339	55.53	Kavitha Maloth	BRS	45,228	25.03	55,511
109	Mulug	Balram Naik	INC	86,825	53.45	Kavitha Maloth	BRS	33,592	20.68	53,233
110	Pinapaka	Balram Naik	INC	77,430	54.74	Kavitha Maloth	BRS	28,111	19.87	49,319
111	Yellandu	Balram Naik	INC	92,957	58.59	Kavitha Maloth	BRS	33,658	21.21	59,299
119	Bhadrachalam	Balram Naik	INC	53,637	50.90	Kavitha Maloth	BRS	19,406	18.41	34,231
Khammam Lok Sabha constituency
112	Khammam	Ramasahayam Raghuram Reddy	INC	1,25,459	61.05	Nama Nageswara Rao	BRS	38,889	19.05	86,570
113	Palair	Ramasahayam Raghuram Reddy	INC	1,20,069	59.52	Nama Nageswara Rao	BRS	58,388	28.94	61,681
114	Madhira	Ramasahayam Raghuram Reddy	INC	1,14,087	62.81	Nama Nageswara Rao	BRS	50,617	27.87	63,470
115	Wyra	Ramasahayam Raghuram Reddy	INC	98,280	62.72	Nama Nageswara Rao	BRS	36,502	23.29	61,778
116	Sat	Ramasahayam Raghuram Reddy	INC	1,20,190	61.13	Nama Nageswara Rao	BRS	50,782	25.82	69,408
117	Kothagudem	Ramasahayam Raghuram Reddy	INC	1,05,402	61.28	Nama Nageswara Rao	BRS	29,225	16.99	76,177
118	Aswaraopeta	Ramasahayam Raghuram Reddy	INC	76,116	59.07	Nama Nageswara Rao	BRS	33,189	25.75	42,927

== See also ==
- 2024 Indian general election in Manipur
- 2024 Indian general election in Uttar Pradesh
- 2024 Indian general election in Chandigarh
