= Palair, Khammam =

Village in Khammam district, Telangana, India

Palair
- Village
- Location of Palair within Telangana
- Coordinates: 17.208°N 79.923°E
- Country: India
- State: Telangana
- District: Khammam
- Tehsil: Kusumanchi

Government
  - MLA: Ponguleti Srinivas Reddy
  - Member of Parliament: Nama Nageswara Rao

Population (2011)
  - Total: 5,143
- Time zone: UTC+5:30 (IST)

Palair or Paleru is a village in Kusumanchi tehsil, Khammam district, in the state of Telangana, India. It is located on the Khammam to Suryapet road, about 30 km (19 mi) from the district headquarters of Khammam, on the banks of the Paleru lake. As of the 2011 Census of India, Palair had a population of 5,143, spread over 1,204 households. Of these, 2,625 were males while females numbered 2,518.

== Government and politics ==
At the state level, Palair is a part of Palair Assembly constituency of the Telangana Legislative Assembly. As of 2023, it is represented in the assembly by Ponguleti Srinivas Reddy of the Indian National Congress.

At the national level, Palair is a part of Khammam Lok Sabha constituency of the Lok Sabha. As of 2019, it is represented in the parliament by Nama Nageswara Rao of the Telangana Rashtra Samithi.
