= Paleru =

River in Telangana, India

Coordinates: 15°19′N 80°06′E

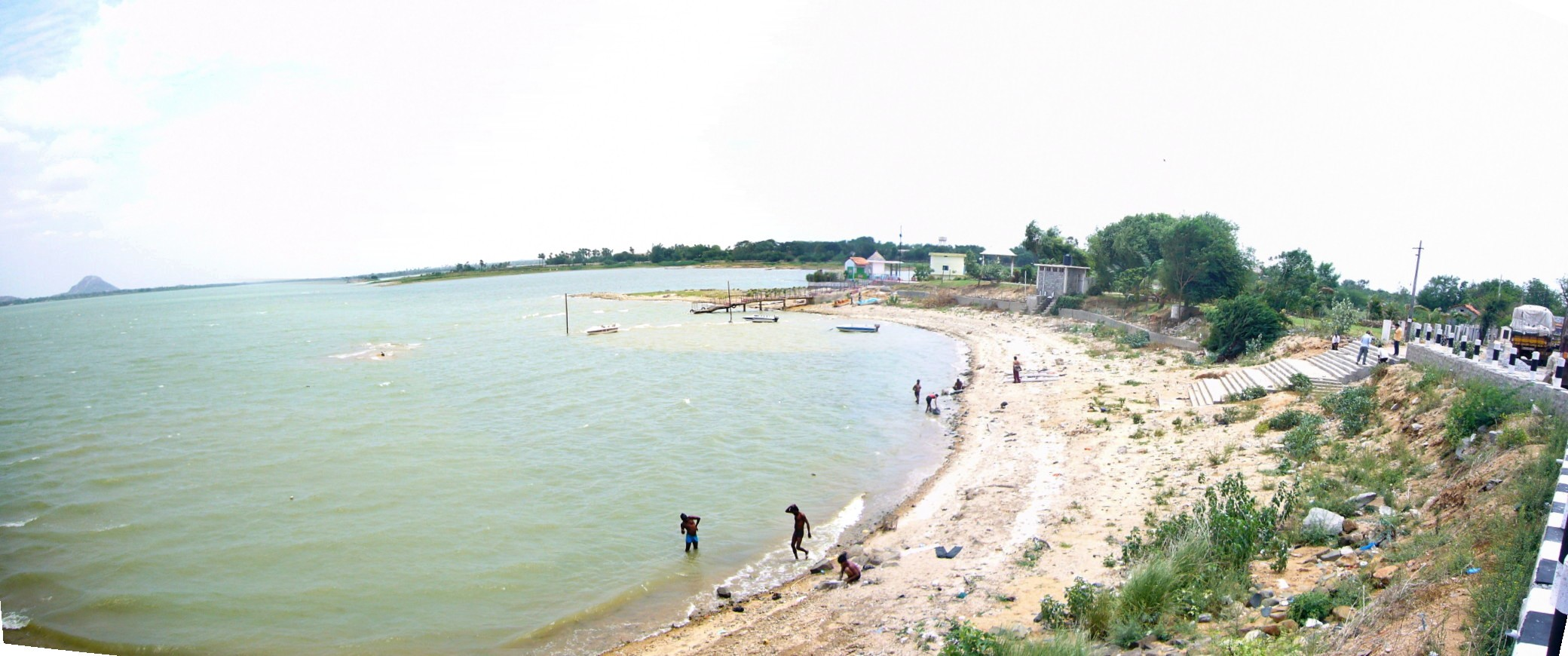
Paleru Reservoir

The Paleru is a tributary of the Krishna river which joins the main river near Mukteswarapuram in Jaggayyapeta mandal of Krishna district in Andhra Pradesh. During the Nizam rule, a reservoir was constructed on the river at Paleru village, Kusumanchi. Hundreds of acres are irrigated with the help of this reservoir. Paleru reservoir acts as a balancing reservoir to the Nagarjunasagar left canal.

== Attraction ==
There is a small park adjoining the reservoir where boating facility is available.

== Bhakta Ramadasu lift irrigation scheme ==
Bhakta Ramadasu Lift Irrigation scheme is in the final stages of completion for using 5.5 tmcft water for stabilising water supply to nearly 60,000 acres which was part of SRSP (stage II) irrigation project. Under this scheme, Nagarjuna Sagar left canal water is lifted by 59 metres from Paleru reservoir and fed into DBM-60 main canal of the SRSP Stage-II project at Madhiripuram in Tirumalayapalem mandal.
