= Garikapati =

Garikapati is one of the Indian family names; mostly in Andhra Pradesh.

- Garikapati Narasimha Rao is a well-known Telugu Avadhani in Andhra Pradesh.
- Garikapati Sreenivasula Naidu is a well- known software engineer from anantapur.
- Garikapati Mohan Rao is a well- known Politician from AP.
- Garikapati Raja Rao, Telugu film director/actor/producer and doctor.
- Garikapati Varalakshmi was a veteran Telugu and Tamil actress, stage artist, singer and director.
