= Palvai Govardhan Reddy =

Indian politician

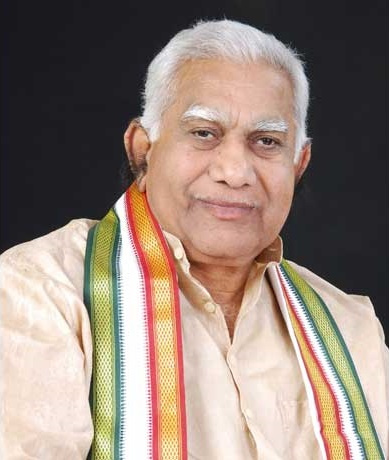
- Palvai Govardhan Reddy

Member of Parliament, Rajya Sabha
- In office 3 April 2012 – 9 June 2017
- Preceded by: M. V. Mysura Reddy
- Succeeded by: Banda Prakash
- Constituency: Telangana; Andhra Pradesh

Member of Legislative Assembly Andhra Pradesh
- In office 1999–2004
- Preceded by: Ujjini Narayan Rao
- Succeeded by: Palla Venkat Reddy
- Constituency: Munugode
- In office 1967–1985
- Preceded by: Constituency Established
- Succeeded by: Ujjini Narayan Rao
- Constituency: Munugode

Personal details
- Born: 20 November 1936 Nadimpally Achampet Mahabubnagar Telangana
- Died: 9 June 2017 (aged 80) Kullu, Himachal Pradesh
- Party: Indian National Congress
- Spouse: Smt Srujamani
- Children: 3
- Website: www.palvai.in

Palvai Govardhan Reddy (20 November 1936 – 9 June 2017) was an Indian politician from the Indian National Congress Party and formerly representing the Telangana State as a Member of Parliament (Rajya Sabha).

He completed B.A. at Vivekavardhini College, Osmania University.

He was member of Andhra Pradesh Legislative Assembly during the terms 1967–1972, 1972–1978, 1978–1983, 1983–1985 and 1999–2004. During 2007–2009 he was Member of the Andhra Pradesh Legislative Council.

== Life ==
Palvai Govardhan Reddy was born in Nadimpally village, Achampet Mandal, Mahabubnagar district of Telangana on 20 November 1936 to Anasuyamma and Ranga Reddy. He visited his Maternal Grandfather's house, swam in the Dindi River and walked to Kamsanapally village.

He studied till 2nd standard at home in Bangarugadda village, Chandur Mandal Nalgonda district. Having no schooling facilities in his village, he moved to his maternal uncle's village Sivannagudem village, Marriguda mandal Nalgonda to complete his education. Due to the Razakar Movement, he had to keep on moving to complete his schooling. He later settled in Hyderabad in 1951 and studied in St. Mary's High School. He studied in Urdu Medium until 5th Standard and later in Telugu Medium. Reddy completed his Intermediate and Graduation from Viveka Vardhani College, Hyderabad. He continued at Viveka Vardhini College in Bachelor of Arts and passed in 1967, the same year he contested as MLA for the first time.

== Personal life ==
He was married to Srujamani in 1962 in Hyderabad, the only daughter of Sarojanamma and late Narayana Reddy residents of Ledalla village, Atmakur Mandal, Warangal district. They had three children Sravan Kumar Reddy (1971), Sravanthi (1973) and Dr Shanthan Reddy (1976).

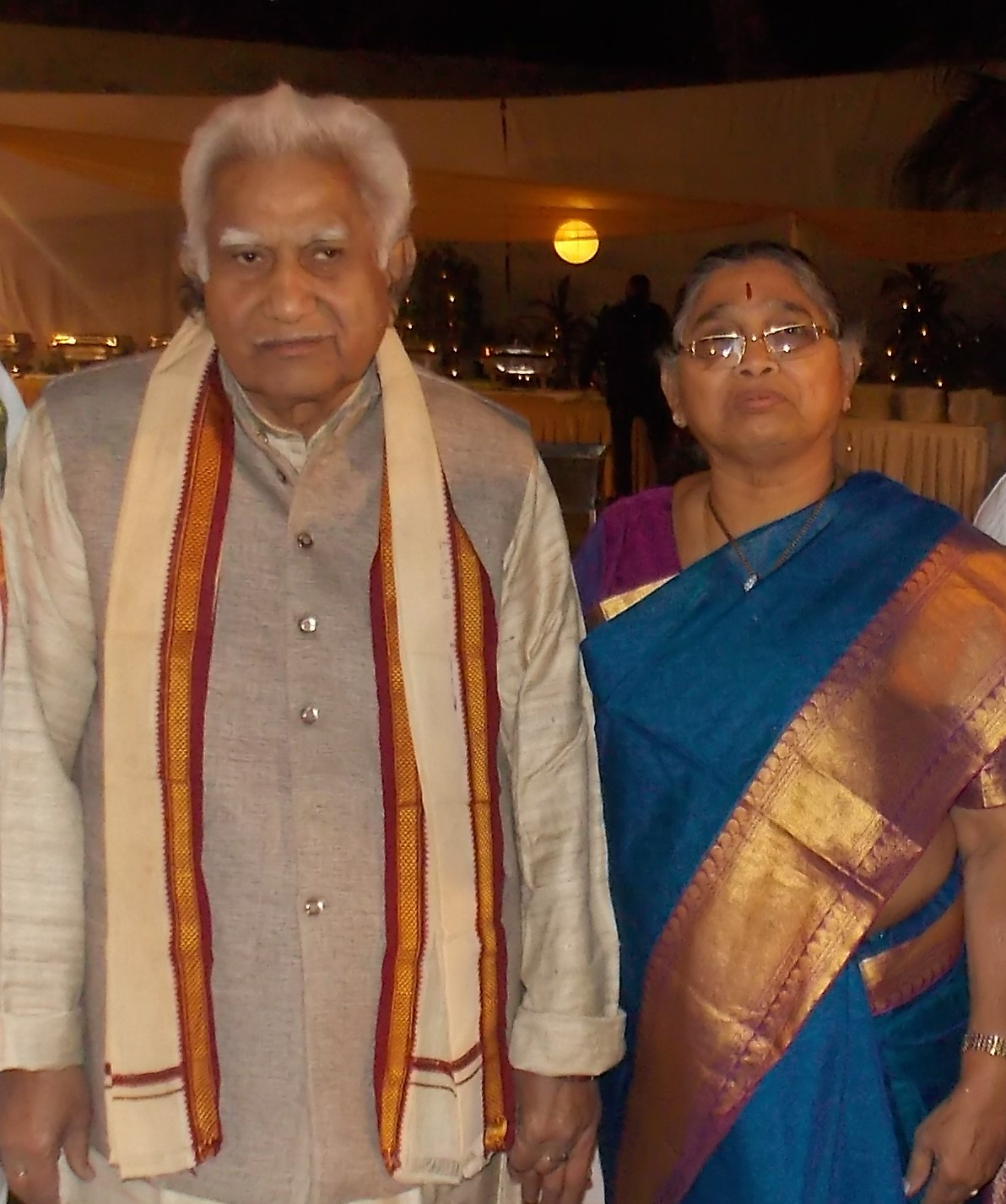
Palvai with Wife Srujamani

== Death ==
He died of a cardiac arrest on 9 June 2017 when he was on his way to attend a Parliamentary Standing Committee meeting in Kullu Himachal Pradesh.
