= Kandala Upender Reddy =

Indian politician

Kandala Upender Reddy (born 9 January 1960) is an Indian politician from Telangana state. He is a former member of the Telangana Legislative Assembly in 2018 from Palair Assembly constituency in Khammam district representing the Indian National Congress.

== Early life ==
Reddy is from Rajupeta village, Kasumanchi mandal, Khammam district. He is the son of K Narasimha Reddy. He completed his B.Sc. at Saifabad Science College, affiliated with Osmania University, Hyderabad in 1980. He declared assets worth Rs.89 crore in his affidavit to the Election Commission of India.

== Career ==
Reddy won the Palair Assembly constituency in the 2018 Telangana Legislative Assembly election representing the Indian National Congress. He polled 89,407 votes and defeated his nearest rival, Thummala Nageswara Rao of the Telangana Rashtra Samithi, by a margin of 7,669 votes.
