= Hetero Drugs =

Indian pharmaceutical company

Hetero Drugs Limited
- Type: Private
- Industry: Pharmaceuticals
- Founded: 1993
- Founder: Dr. B. Parthasaradhi Reddy
- Headquarters: Hyderabad, India
- Key people: Dr. B. Vamsi Krishna Reddy
- Number of employees: Over 22,000
- Website: www.heterodrugs.com

Hetero Drugs is an Indian pharmaceutical company headquartered in Hyderabad and the world's largest producer of anti-retroviral drugs. Hetero's business includes APIs, generics, biosimilars, custom pharmaceutical services, and branded generics.

== Operations ==
Hetero Group employs over 30,000 people and has operations in 145+ countries.

Hetero Group’s subsidiaries include Hetero Healthcare and Hetero Research Foundation, and also foreign subsidiaries such as Camber Pharmaceuticals in the United States and Southeast Asia, Amarox Pharma Global in Europe and GCC, and Seven Pharma in Latin America.

Hetero also operates Asia's Largest API SEZ manufacturing complex for APIs, with over 1000 reactors.

== Founding ==
Hetero was founded in 1993 by DR.B. Parthasaradhi Reddy in Hyderabad, India. As a scientist holding a doctorate in synthetic chemistry from Osmania University, Dr. B.P.S Reddy had previously served as chief technologist at Dr. Reddy’s Laboratories. While working there, Dr. B.P.S Reddy was inspired to set up his own laboratory, driven by the commitment to develop affordable, high-quality generic medicines while generating valuable opportunities for the rural communities he came from.

== History ==
1993-2000

In 1994, Hetero began operating their first API manufacturing unit in Hyderabad, and by 1995 Hetero formalized its commitment to scientific research with the establishment of the Hetero Research Foundation (HRF). HRF is a dedicated research institution that serves as the engine of the company’s new medicine development and molecule work.

By 1997, four years after its founding, Hetero emerged as one of the leading companies globally offering affordable antiretroviral APIs, having independently developed generic processes for more than 20 molecules. This placed Hetero at the forefront of the global effort to improve access to HIV/AIDS treatment in low income countries at a time when branded ARVs were incredibly expensive for the majority of patients.

2001-2005

Three years later, in 2001, Hetero received its first USFDA approval for an API facility in Hyderabad, marking the company’s formal entry into regulatory environments and laying the foundation for its subsequent US businesses.

By 2005, Hetero broadened its capabilities beyond antiretrovirals and gained recognition as one of the first companies in India to develop and market the antiviral medication Oseltamivir, for the treatment of bird flu and swine flu.

2006-2009

In 2006, Hetero received USFDA approval for a finished dosage manufacturing facility in Hyderabad, an important development that enabled the company to supply generic formulations directly to the US market. This marked Hetero’s vertical integration from raw material production to patient ready medicines.

In 2007, Hetero commissioned and established Asia’s largest Special Economic Zone (SEZ) for API manufacturing in Visakhapatnam, Visakhapatnam district Andhra Pradesh. The scale of the infrastructure provided by the complex enabled Hetero to pursue its ambitions as a global bulk pharmaceutical supplier.

=== Swine Flu Outbreak ===
In 2009, Hetero established Hetero Biopharma, a dedicated R&D unit, and set up a biological manufacturing unit in Hyderabad and quickly became a manufacturer of affordable biosimilars. In the same year, Hetero garnered widespread attention for its public health emergency response capabilities during the Swine Flu outbreak. As various health organizations and government agencies were piling up stocks of Oseltamivir as precautionary measures, Hetero supplied generic Oseltamivir under its brand name Fluvir.

Hetero delivered 10 million doses of Oseltamivir to the Indian government in 2009, and shipped about 80 million doses to over 60 countries.Hetero received its second order from Indian government to supply another 10 million doses of Oseltamivir later in 2009.

2014-2019

In 2014, Hetero launched the blockbuster drug Sofosbuvir, a direct-acting antiviral used for the treatment of Hepatitis C, with approval from Gilead Sciences. The drug was marketed and sold in 90 countries, including India, Asia Pacific, Sub-Saharan Africa and other least developed countries, making it accessible at a substantially lower cost to patients.

In 2015, Hetero took a step further in Hep C care by becoming the first company in India to launch the fixed-dose combination of Ledipasvir+ Sofosbuvir, used in the treatment of chronic hepatitis genotype 1 in both treatment –naïve and treatment experienced patients.

In the same year, Hetero expanded its biosimilar portfolio by launching Darbepoetin Alfa and Rituximab- two complex biologics used in the treatment of Non-Hodgkin Lymphoma (NHL) and Chronic Lymphocytic Leukaemia (CLL).

In 2016, Hetero launched its third biosimilar product, Bevacizumab, a monoclonal antiangiogenic used for the treatment of metastatic colorectal cancer (mCRC). These launches established Hetero as one of the few Indian pharmaceutical companies with a biosimilar business spanning multiple therapeutic indications.

In 2017, Hetero received approval from the Drug Controller General of India to produce Velasof, a Sofosbuvir+Velpatasvir fixed dose combination used to treat chronic hepatitis C genotype 1 to 6. The product was launched under a non-exclusive licensing agreement with Gilead Sciences.

In 2018, Hetero’s European subsidiary, Amarox Pharma, acquired Tarbis Farma S.L., a Spanish pharmaceutical distribution company, strengthening Hetero’s stand in the European market as they expanded into the retail and hospital pharmacy chains.

=== COVID 19 ===
The COVID 19 pandemic marked a new chapter in Hetero’s public health contributions. In March 2020, as the pandemic took hold, Hetero donated INR 10 crore to the Telangana government’s COVID relief fund, composed of 5 crores in direct funding and 5 crores in essential medicines including Hydroxychloroquine Sulphate, Lopinavir/Ritonavir and Oseltamivir. During this period, Hetero also began supplying medicines to countries such as the United States, Italy, Spain, Israel, and Algeria.

In May 2020, Hetero entered a licensing agreement with Gilead Sciences to manufacture and distribute a generic version of Remdesivir in 127 countries. The Drug Controller General of India granted manufacturing and marketing approval on 21 June 2020, making Covifor the first generic Remdesivir approved in India. An initial consignment of 20000 Vials was distributed within India across major cities including Hyderabad, Delhi, Mumbai, Kolkata and Chennai, priced at ₹5400 per vial. By August 2020, Hetero had supplied approximately 800000 doses of Remdesivir in India alone, treating more than 100000 patients. In the same month, Hetero received authorization from the South African Health Products Regulatory Authority (SAHPRA) to import 'Remdesivir' in South Africa for the treatment for Covid-19, and committed to supplying 60000 vials a month.

In July 2020, Hetero received approval from the DCGI to manufacture and market a generic version of Favipiravir tablets under the name Favivir, which is used to treat patients with mild to moderate COVID-19 symptoms.

In November 2020, Hetero signed an agreement with the Russian Direct Investment Fund (RDIF) to manufacture more than 100 million doses of Sputnik V, the world’s first registered COVID-19 vaccine.

Hetero continued its response to COVID-19 with the launch of Movfor (molnupiravir) in late 2021 and Nirmacom (a generic version of nirmatrelvir-ritonavir) in 2022. In December 2022, Nirmacom became the first generic adaptation of the COVID treatment to receive WHO prequalification, allowing Hetero to distribute it to 95 LMICs under a voluntary license administered through the Medicines Patent Pool.

2023- Present

In 2023, Hetero celebrated 30 years of its journey from a small-time API producer to a global pharmaceutical manufacturing powerhouse.

In 2024, Hetero entered a partnership with Gilead Sciences to expand availability of Lenacapavir, a long acting injectable HIV treatment, across 120 high-incidence countries in order to support the global HIV response.

In 2025, Hetero opened a new commercial office in Warsaw, Poland, marking the company’s formal entry into the Eastern European pharmaceutical markets.

In 2026, Hetero launched generic versions of semaglutide - the active ingredient in medicines for type 2 diabetes and obesity management- in emerging markets under the names Truglyx, Rolmodl, and Moto G.

== Sustainability ==
Hetero reports its ESG performance annually with reference to the Global Reporting Initiative (GRI), the Sustainability Accounting Standards Board( SASB), and the UN Global Compact.

Environment

Hetero leads its environment strategy with the stated goal of reaching net zero emissions by 2045. Interim environmental targets include 25% reduction in Scope 1 and Scope 2 emissions by 2030 (with 2022 as a baseline), a 30% increase in the use of renewable energy by 2030, and becoming a Zero Waste to Landfill company in the same year.

According to the company’s FY2024-2025 Sustainability report, the company’s Scope 1 emissions were 3,12,435 tCO₂e and Scope 2 emissions were 2,95,020 tCO₂e, resulting in total Scope 1 and Scope 2 emissions of 6,07,455 tCO₂e. Emissions intensity for the year stood at 3.09 tCO₂e per million INR revenue, while biogenic emissions amounted to 72425 tCO₂e.

The company also completed its first Scope 3 inventory, covering 13 categories and totalling 1,253,550 tCO₂e. 20% of Hetero’s total energy consumption came from renewable sources. The company recycled 343849 kilolitres of wastewater through Zero Liquid Discharge systems, and recycled 100% of non-hazardous waste, resulting in two sites (Annora and Jeedimetla) receiving Zero Waste to Landfill certification.

Social

Hetero’s social approach revolves around workforce wellbeing, diversity, inclusion, and occupational safety.

As of FY2024-25, Hetero employed 18292 people directly and 10355 people through contract. Women made up 13.63% of direct workforce and 19.28% of contract workers. The majority of Hetero’s workforce is under 50, with 48.39% of employees aged 30-50 and another 50% under 30.

Gender pays ratios ranged from 0.86:1 to 0.97:1 across management levels, reaching parity (1:1) for contract workers.

Mahila Abhyudaya

Hetero runs a program called Mahila Abhyudaya aimed at integrating women into production roles historically dominated by men, alongside dedicated women’s walk-in recruitment drives. The company reported zero POSH (prevention of sexual harassment) cases and zero incidents of discrimination on any basis during FY 2024-25. All employees are eligible for parental leave. 514 men and 64 women took parental leave during the year, with a 100% return to work rate and 100% 12 month retention rate.

Employees received a total of 901175 hours of training during the year, averaging 44/88 hours per employee and 14.12 hours per contract worker. Training is split into roughly 54% Good Manufacturing Practices, 30% safety, and 16% learning and development content.

Hetero operates several structured programs for employee training, including

Manthan: technical/ functional skills, using AR/VR training technology

Pragati: leadership and behavioral skills across three tiers

Sammati: compliance training on ethics, safety and green chemistry

Unnati: talent development and social outreach

Bharosa: mental health and wellness

A dedicated Nipuna training center and Darpan skill development centre support technical upskilling and bridge the academia-industry gaps. All employees receive a formal performance and career development review during the year.

== Corporate Social Responsibility ==
As part of their Corporate Social Responsibility commitment, Hetero Group founded Sindhu Hospitals, a not-for-profit yet premium healthcare facility dedicated to providing world class healthcare underserved communities.
