= YRK =

YRK or yrk may refer to:

- YRK (politician), Yalamanchili Radhakrishna Murthy (died 2013), Indian politician
- Yekîneyên Rojhilatê Kurdistan, or Eastern Kurdistan Units, the armed wing of the Kurdistan Free Life Party in Iran
- Nenets languages (ISO-639-3 code)
- York railway station, Yorkshire, UK (National Rail code)
- York International, a brand owned by Johnson Controls (former stock symbol)
