= K. V. P. Ramachandra Rao =

Indian politician

Dr. K.V P Ramachandra

Member of Parliament, Rajya Sabha
- In office 2 June 2014 – 9 April 2020
- Succeeded by: K. R. Suresh Reddy
- Constituency: Telangana
- In office 10 April 2008 – 9 April 2014
- Preceded by: Ravula Chandrasekhar Reddy
- Succeeded by: Garikapati Mohan Rao
- Constituency: Andhra Pradesh

Personal details
- Born: 21 June 1950 (age 76) Ampapuram, Krishna district, Andhra Pradesh
- Party: Indian National Congress
- Spouse: Kotagiri Suneetha
- Children: 2 sons

K.V P. Ramachandra (also called "KVP", born 21 June 1948), is a Member of Parliament in India and chief adviser to the former chief minister of Andhra Pradesh Y. S. Rajasekhara Reddy. He belongs to the Indian National Congress party. After the bifurcation of Andhra Pradesh he was allotted to Telangana state by a draw of lots.

== Career ==
Ramachandra Rao was appointed as chief advisor to the Government of Andhra Pradesh on Public Affairs in a cabinet rank in May 2004. He was elected to the Upper House of the Indian parliament, the Rajya Sabha in April 2008.

He is the chairman of the Advisory Committee on Public Affairs, Public Utilities and Public Welfare Activities.

On 2 April 2014, Rao was indicted by a US grand jury for his role in an international corruption scheme starting June 2006 involving bribery in the approval of a mining contract with the Government of Andhra Pradesh. The indictment charged Rao with soliciting and distributing bribes for himself and to leaders of the Andhra Pradesh and Central Governments. The Indian National Congress led the ruling party in both the state and central governments between 2006 and February 2014 (in the state).

== Personal life ==
Ramachandra Rao is married, and he and his wife have two sons.

== Positions held ==
- May 2004-March 2008 Advisor to Government of Andhra Pradesh on Public Affairs (Cabinet Rank)
- April 2008 Elected to Rajya Sabha
- August 2008 onwards Member, Committee on Finance.
- 28 November 2010 Submitted his Resignation as advisor to Govt
- Currently campaigning for Congress (I) .
