= List of Rajya Sabha members from Telangana =

The Rajya Sabha (meaning the "Council of States") is the upper house of the Parliament of India. Telangana elects 7 seats and they are indirectly elected by the state legislators of Telangana. The number of seats allocated to the party, are determined by the number of seats a party possesses during nomination and the party nominates a member to be voted on. After the Bifurcation of Andhra Pradesh, members were allotted to Telangana state for the first time by lucky draw.

== Current Members ==
#	Name	Party	Term start	Term end
1	Abhishek Singhvi	INC	10-Apr-2026	09-Apr-2032
2	Renuka Chowdhury	INC	03-Apr-2024	02-Apr-2030
3	M. Anil Kumar Yadav	INC	03-Apr-2024	02-Apr-2030
4	Vem Narender Reddy	INC	10-Apr-2026	09-Apr-2032
5	B. Parthasaradhi Reddy	BRS	22-Jun-2022	21-Jun-2028
6	D. Damodar Rao	BRS	22-Jun-2022	21-Jun-2028
7	Vaddiraju Ravi Chandra	BRS	03-Apr-2024	02-Apr-2030

== Members Bifurcated From Andhra Pradesh ==
Before the bifurcation of states, the combined state of Andhra Pradesh used to represent 18 seats to Rajya Sabha. Post bifurcation, Andhra Pradesh seats were changed to 11 and Telangana has had 7 seats since then. On 30 May 2014, draw was conducted amongst the existing 18 members to select the 7 members of Telangana. In the draw, 3 members of Telugu Desam Party (TDP) and 4 members of Indian National Congress (INC) were selected.

Name	Party	Term start	Term end	Term	Notes
Renuka Chowdhury	INC	03-Apr-2024	02-Apr-2030	1	
M. Anil Kumar Yadav	INC	03-Apr-2024	02-Apr-2030	1	
Vaddiraju Ravi Chandra	BRS	03-Apr-2024	02-Apr-2030	2	
B. Parthasaradhi Reddy	BRS	22-Jun-2022	21-Jun-2028	1	
D. Damodar Rao	BRS	22-Jun-2022	21-Jun-2028	1	
Vaddiraju Ravichandra	BRS	30-May-2022	02-Apr-2024	1	bye - resignation of Banda Prakash
K. Keshava Rao	BRS	10-Apr-2020	09-Apr-2026	1	
K. R. Suresh Reddy	BRS	10-Apr-2020	09-Apr-2026	1	
Banda Prakash	BRS	03-Apr-2018	04-Dec-2021	1	elected to Telangana Legislative Council
B. Lingaiah Yadav	BRS	03-Apr-2018	02-Apr-2024	1	
Joginapally Santosh Kumar	BRS	03-Apr-2018	02-Apr-2024	1	
V. Lakshmikantha Rao	BRS	22-Jun-2016	21-Jun-2022	1	
D. Srinivas	BRS	22-Jun-2016	21-Jun-2022	1	
Garikapati Mohan Rao	BJP	10-Apr-2014	09-Apr-2020	1	
K. V. P. Ramachandra Rao	INC	10-Apr-2014	09-Apr-2020	1	
Rapolu Ananda Bhaskar	INC	03-Apr-2012	02-Apr-2018	1	
Palvai Govardhan Reddy	INC	03-Apr-2012	09-Jun-2017	1	death
C. M. Ramesh	TDP	03-Apr-2012	02-Apr-2018	1	
V. Hanumantha Rao	INC	22-Jun-2010	21-Jun-2016	1	
Gundu Sudha Rani	TDP	22-Jun-2010	21-Jun-2016	1	
