= G. Ranjith Reddy =

Member of the 17th Lok Sabha

Member of Parliament, Lok Sabha
- In office 2019–2024
- Preceded by: Konda Vishweshwar Reddy
- Succeeded by: Konda Vishweshwar Reddy
- Constituency: Chevella

Personal details
- Born: Gaddam Ranjith Reddy; 18 September 1964 (age 61) Warangal
- Party: Indian National Congress
- Other political affiliations: Bharat Rashtra Samithi
- Spouse: G. Seetha Reddy
- Occupation: politician

Gaddam Ranjith Reddy is an Indian politician and businessman from the state of Telangana. He is the former Member of Parliament from Chevella Lok Sabha constituency. He is the member of Indian National Congress.

Ranjith Reddy announced his resignation from the BRS party on 17 March 2024 ahead of 2024 Lok Sabha polls.
