= Vaddiraju Ravi Chandra =

Indian politician

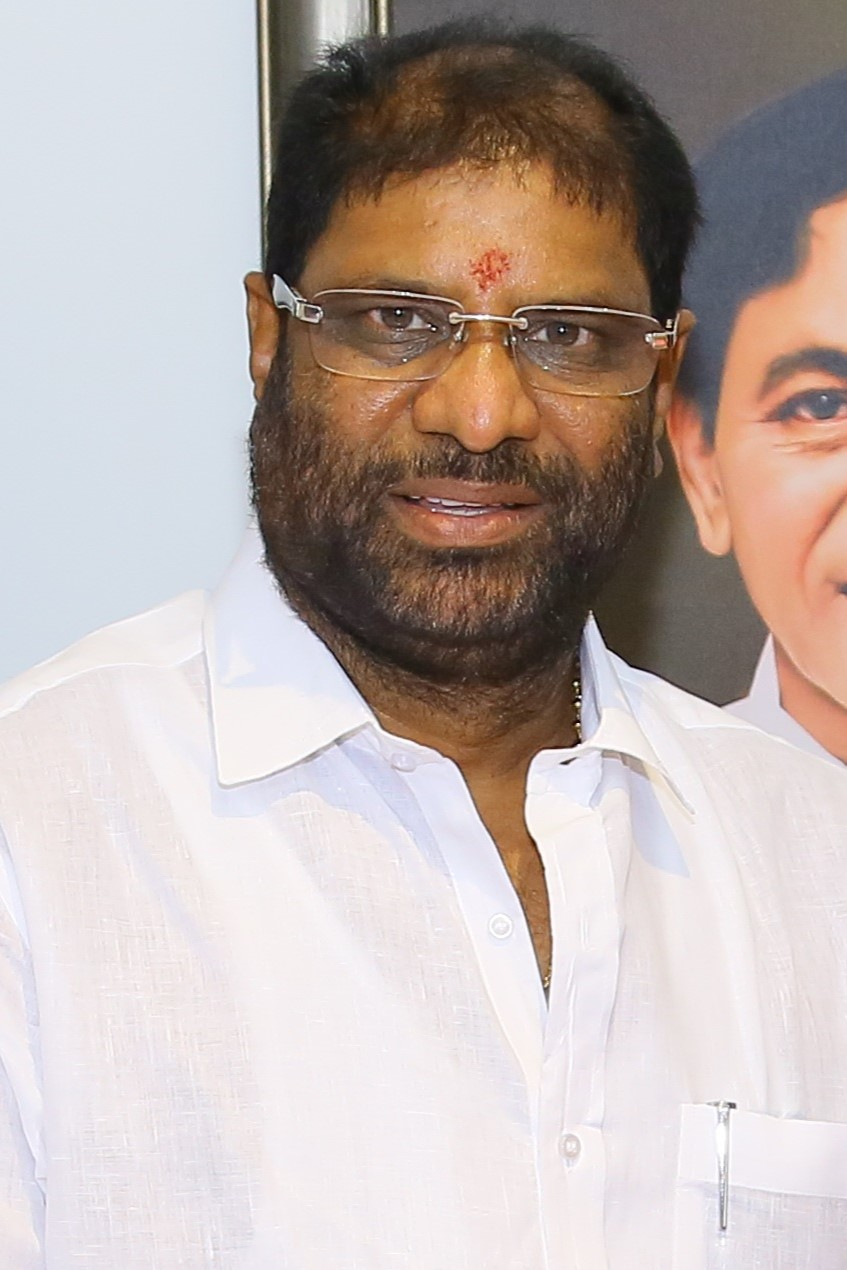

Member of Parliament, Rajya Sabha
- Incumbent
- Assumed office 25 May 2022
- Preceded by: Banda Prakash
- Constituency: Telangana

Personal details
- Born: 22 March 1964 (age 62) Inugurthy, Kesamudram Mandal, Mahabubabad district, Telangana, India
- Party: Bharat Rashtra Samithi
- Other political affiliations: Indian National Congress
- Spouse: Vijayalakshmi
- Children: Ganga Bhavani, Nikhil Saichandra
- Parent(s): Narayana, Venkata Narsamma

Vaddiraju Ravi Chandra is an Indian politician. He is a member of parliament, representing Telangana in the Rajya Sabha the upper house of Indian Parliament as a member of the Bharat Rashtra Samithi. Ravichandra, popularly known as Gayatri Ravi, is the Founder Chairman of Gayatri Group, president of Telangana Granite Quarry Owners Association and also the honorary President of the Telangana Munnuru Kapu All Association JAC and the National Union of Backward Castes.

== Personal life ==
Vaddiraju Ravi Chandra was born in Inugurthy village, Kesamudram mandal, Mahabubabad district of Telangana on 22 March 1964 to Narayana and Venkata Narsamma.

== Political life ==
Vaddiraju Ravi Chandra contested 2018 Telangana Legislative Assembly election as congress candidate from Warangal East Assembly constituency and he lost the election to Nannapuneni Narender of the TRS. He later Joined TRS party in 2019. Ravichandra has been nominated for the by-election caused by the resignation of TRS member Banda Prakash on 18 May 2022 and was unanimously elected to the Rajya Sabha on 23 May 2022. His term in the Rajya Sabha was set to end on 2 April 2024.

Vaddiraju Ravi Chandra's candidature was finalized by BRS President K. Chandrashekar Rao who renominated him to Rajya Sabha for the second time after discussions with senior leaders on 14 February 2024. He was elected unopposed for the second time and made as BRS parliamentary party deputy leader in Rajya Sabha on 23 June 2024.

Ravichandra was appointed as the leader of the BRS Parliamentary Party and BRS floor leader in the Rajya Sabha by BRS President Kalvakuntla Chandrasekhar Rao (KCR) on 9 July 2026.

== Election History ==
=== Rajya Sabha ===
Position	Party	Constituency	From	To	Tenure
Member of Parliament, Rajya Sabha (1st Term)	BRS	Telangana	25 May 2022	2 April 2024	1 year, 313 days
Member of Parliament, Rajya Sabha (2nd Term)	BRS	Telangana	3 April 2024	2 April 2030	2 years, 97 days
