= D. Damodar Rao =

Indian politician

Divakonda Damodar Rao

Member of Parliament, Rajya Sabha
- Incumbent
- Assumed office 22 June 2022
- Constituency: Telangana

Personal details
- Party: Bharat Rashtra Samithi

Divakonda Damodar Rao is an Indian politician and a member of the Rajya Sabha, upper house of the Parliament of India from Telangana as a member of the Bharat Rashtra Samithi.
