= Ramreddy Venkat Reddy =

Indian politician

Ramreddy Venkata Reddy (born 22 May 1944 – 4 March 2016) was an Indian politician from Telangana state. He was a former five time Member of the Legislative Assembly. He last became an MLA in 2014, in the Telangana Legislative Assembly from Palair Assembly constituency, in the then Khammam district representing the Indian National Congress. He was a former member of the Andhra Pradesh Legislative Assembly from Shujatnagar Assembly constituency in the erstwhile Khammam district for four terms in 1996 (bypoll), 1999, 2004 and from Palair seat in 2009 (AP) and 2014 (Telangana).

== Early life ==
Reddy was born on 22 May 1944 at Pathalingala, Khammam district, Andhra Pradesh to Narayana Reddy and Kamalamma. He did his schooling from Class 6 to 10 at Mahabubabad, Warangal district, and completed his PUC at NBC College, Hyderabad, in 1963. He later did his graduation in arts at a college affiliated with Osmania University and passed out in 1967. He declared assets worth Rs.43 lakhs in 2009, in his affidavit to the Election Commission of India.

== Career ==
Reddy won the Palair Assembly constituency in the 2014 Andhra Pradesh Legislative Assembly election representing the Indian National Congress. He polled 69,707 votes and defeated his nearest rival, Maddineni Swarna Kumari of the Telugu Desam Party, by a margin of 21,863 votes.

He also served as a minister for cooperation and horticulture in former combined Andhra Pradesh state in the ministries of three chief ministers, Y. S. Rajasekhar Reddy, K. Rosaiah and Kiran Kumar Reddy Cabinets till 2014.

He entered electoral politics contesting the Shujatnagar Assembly constituency on the Congess ticket in the 1994 Andhra Pradesh Legislative Assembly election but lost to Mohammad Rajab Ali of the CPI. In 1994, he polled 48,952 votes and lost by a margin of 1,783 votes. However, he polled 67,184 votes and defeated his nearest rival, T.V. Chowdhary of the Communist Party of India, in the 1996 by election by a margin of 19,067 votes. He retained the seat for the Congress party in the 1999 election and made it three consecutive wins with the 2004. After the delimitation, he won the Plair seat in 2009 and 2014.

In sixties, he entered politics becoming the Sarpanch of Patalalingala and also served as the chairperson of the Central Cooperative Bank before joining the Indian National Congres.

=== Death ===
Reddy died after a prolonged illness due to lung cancer at a private hospitall in Hyderabad on 4 March 2016.
