= Renuka Chowdhury =

Indian politician

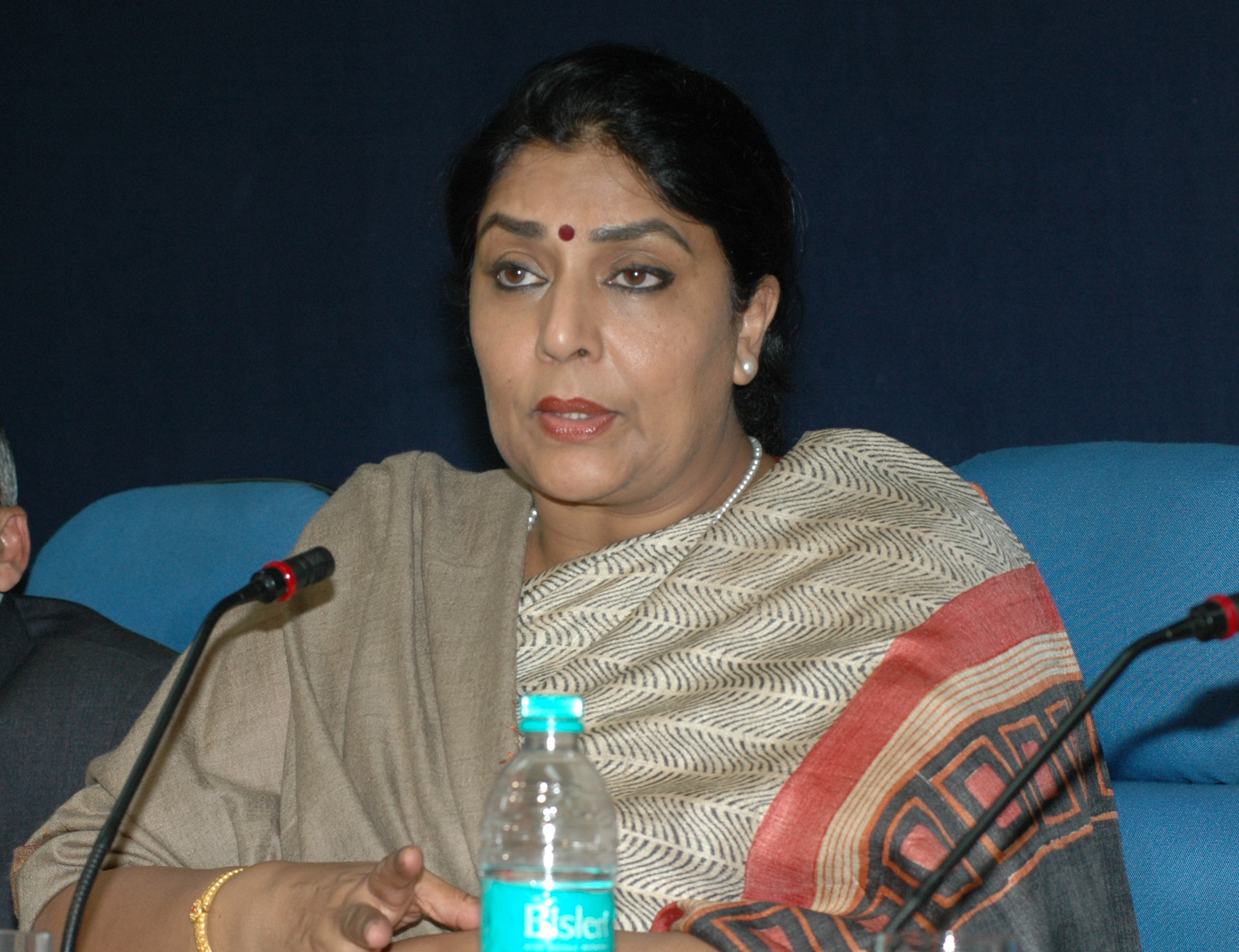
- Renuka Chowdhury during a media press meet in New Delhi in December 2007.

Minister of State (Independent Charge) for Women and Child Development
- In office 29 January 2006 – 22 May 2009
- Prime Minister: Manmohan Singh
- Preceded by: Office Established
- Succeeded by: Krishna Tirath

Minister of State (Independent Charge) for Tourism
- In office 23 May 2004 – 28 January 2006
- Prime Minister: Manmohan Singh
- Preceded by: Jagmohan
- Succeeded by: Ambika Soni

Member of Parliament, Lok Sabha
- In office 10 October 1999 – 18 May 2009
- Preceded by: Nadendla Bhaskara Rao
- Succeeded by: Nama Nageswara Rao
- Constituency: Khammam

Minister of State for Health and Family Welfare
- In office 9 June 1997 – 19 March 1998
- Prime Minister: I. K. Gujral
- Preceded by: Saleem Iqbal Shervani; Minister of State (Independent Charge)
- Succeeded by: Dalit Ezhilmalai; Minister of State (Independent Charge)

Member of Parliament, Rajya Sabha
- Incumbent
- Assumed office 3 April 2024
- Preceded by: Badulgula Lingaiah Yadav
- Constituency: Telangana
- In office 3 April 2012 – 2 April 2018
- Preceded by: M. V. Mysura Reddy
- Succeeded by: Banda Prakash
- Constituency: Telangana (30 May 2014 - 2 April 2018); Andhra Pradesh (3 April 2012 - 29 May 2014)
- In office 3 April 1986 – 2 April 1998
- Preceded by: Syed R Ali
- Succeeded by: Yadlapati Venkata Rao
- Constituency: Andhra Pradesh

Personal details
- Born: 13 August 1954 (age 72) Visakhapatnam, Andhra State, India
- Party: Indian National Congress (1998–present)
- Other political affiliations: Telugu Desam Party (1984–1998)
- Spouse(s): Sreedhar Chowdhury (m. 7 October 1973)
- Children: 2
- Education: Karnatak University
- Occupation: Politician, social Worker

Renuka Chowdhury (born 13 August 1954) is an Indian politician and a member of Parliament (Rajya Sabha) representing Indian National Congress. She represented the political party in the Rajya Sabha from Andhra Pradesh and currently in Telangana. She has also served as the Union minister of State (Independent Charge) for Ministry of Women and Child Development and Tourism in the Government of India.

== Early life ==
Born to Air Commodore Suryanarayana Rao and Vasundhara on 13 August 1954 in a Telugu Kamma Family in Vishakhapatnam (Andhra Pradesh). Her forefathers migrated from Northern India during Mughal period as an infantry and were settled by Mughal Emperor around Golkonda Fort for as a reward for helping in capturing the fort.

Renuka is the eldest of three daughters. She studied at the Welham Girls' School, Dehradun and received her B.A

== Career ==
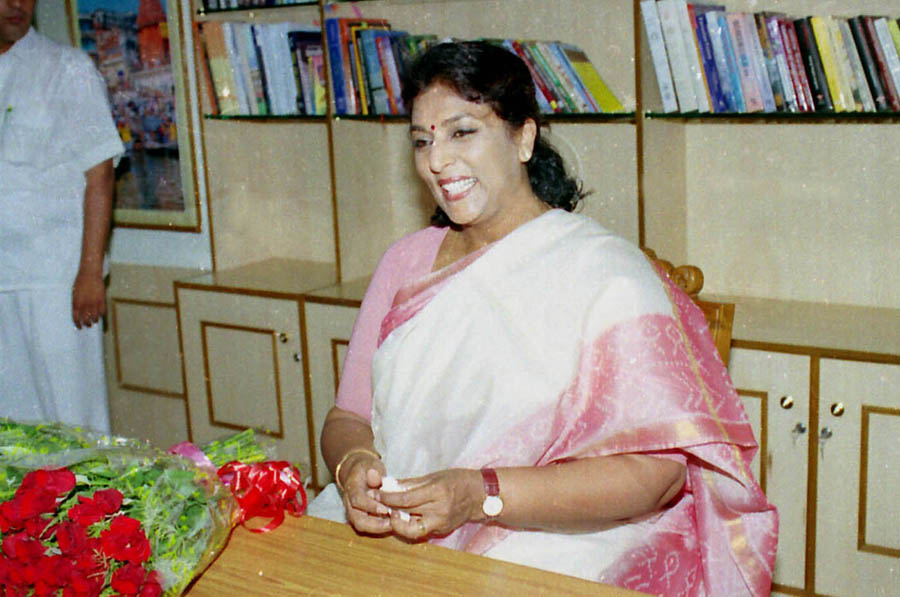
Renuka Chowdhury in her office as Minister of State (Independent Charge) for Tourism in New Delhi on May 24, 2004

Renuka Chowdhury entered politics in 1984 as a member of Telugu Desam Party. She was a member of the Rajya Sabha for two consecutive terms and Chief Whip of Telugu Desam Parliamentary party from 1986 to 1998. She was also the Union Minister of State for Health and Family Welfare from 1997 to 1998 in the cabinet of H. D. Deve Gowda. She left Telugu Desam Party to join Congress party in 1998. In 1999 and 2004, she was elected to the 13th and 14th Lok Sabha respectively representing Khammam. Other positions include memberships on the Committee on Finance (1999–2000) and Committee on the Empowerment of Women (2000–2001).

In May 2004 she became the Minister of State for Tourism in the UPA I government. She was the Union minister of State (Independent Charge) for Ministry of Women and Child Development in the UPA I government from January 2006 to May 2009. In the May 2009 Lok Sabha elections, Renuka Chowdary was defeated by Nama Nageswara Rao of TDP from Khammam by 1,24,448 votes. The Mumbai newspaper, Mid Day, reported in 2009 that, in response to "Sri Ram Sena's Valentine's Day threat" Chowdary said that youth should "swarm" pubs and make a point to the "moral police brigade". After the 2009 Mangalore pub attack by the Sri Ram Sena Chouwdary commented that Mangalore had been "talibanized". This resulted in a case being filed against her by the town's mayor, accusing her of glorifying isolated incidents and making generalized comments about the city. The "Pub Bharo" campaign was actually being headed by her younger daughter Tejaswini.

Chowdary became a spokesperson for the Congress and was re-elected to Rajya Sabha in 2012, and 2024 from Telangana.

=== Parliamentary Committees ===
- Member, Committee on Finance (1999-2000)
- Member, Committee on the Empowerment of Women (2000-2001)
- Member, Committee on Government Assurances (May 2012 – Sept. 2014)
- Member, Committee on Finance (May 2012 – May 2014)
- Member, Business Advisory Committee (May 2013 – Sept. 2014)
- Member, Committee on Agriculture (Sept. 2014–Present)
- Member, House Committee (Sept. 2014–Present)
- Member, General Purposes Committee (April 2016 – Present)
- Chairperson, Committee on Science and Technology, Environment and Forests (April 2016 – 2018)
- Member, Committee on Commerce (Sept. 2024 onwards)
- Member, Consultative Committee for the Ministry of Health and Family Welfare (Oct. 2024 onwards)

== Elections Contested ==
=== Rajya Sabha ===
Position	Party	Constituency	From	To	Tenure
Member of Parliament, Rajya Sabha (1st Term)	TDP	Andhra Pradesh	3 April 1986	2 April 1992	5 years, 365 days
Member of Parliament, Rajya Sabha (2nd Term)	TDP	Andhra Pradesh	3 April 1992	2 April 1998	5 years, 364 days
Member of Parliament, Rajya Sabha (3rd Term)	INC	Andhra Pradesh	3 April 2012	2 April 2018	5 years, 364 days
Member of Parliament, Rajya Sabha (4th Term)	INC	Telangana	3 April 2024	Incumbent	2 years, 212 days

=== Lok Sabha ===
Year	Constituency	Party	Votes	%	Opponent	Party	Votes	%	Result	Margin	%
1999	Khammam	INC	328,596	34.70	Baby Swarna Kumari	TDP	320,198	33.80	Won	▲8,398	▲0.90
2004	Khammam	INC	518,047	50.63	Nama Nageswara Rao	TDP	409,159	39.99	Won	▲108,888	▲10.64
2009	Khammam	INC	344,920	33.36	Nama Nageswara Rao	TDP	469,368	45.39	Lost	▼124,448	▼12.03
2019	Khammam	INC	399,397	35.04	Nama Nageswara Rao	TRS	567,459	49.78	Lost	▼168,062	▼14.74
