= T. B. Vittal Rao =

Indian politician

Member of Parliament, Lok Sabha
- In office 1952-1962
- Succeeded by: T. Lakshmi Kantamma
- Constituency: Khammam

Personal details
- Born: 16 August 1915
- Party: Communist Party of India
- Other political affiliations: People's Democratic Front (Hyderabad)
- Spouse: Sugandani Devi

T. B. Vittal Rao was an Indian politician. He was elected to the Lok Sabha, the lower house of the Parliament of India from Khammam as a member of the Communist Party of India.
