= Badulgula Lingaiah Yadav =

Badugula Lingaiah Yadav

Member of Parliament, Rajya Sabha
- In office 3 April 2018 – 2 April 2024
- Preceded by: Rapolu Ananda Bhaskar
- Succeeded by: Renuka Chowdhury
- Constituency: Telangana

Personal details
- Born: India
- Party: Telangana Rashtra Samithi

Badugula Lingaiah Yadav is a political leader from the Telangana Rashtra Samithi party and presently a Member of the Parliament of India representing Telangana in the Rajya Sabha, the upper house of the Indian Parliament. He was elected to the upper house on 23 March 2018.

His father in law, G. Ram Murthy Yadav, as a TDP candidate defeated K. Jana Reddy in 1994 from Chalakurthi Assembly constituency.
