= Jalagam Kondala Rao =

Indian politician

Member of Parliament, Lok Sabha
- In office 1977-1984
- Preceded by: T. Lakshmi Kantamma
- Succeeded by: Jalagam Vengala Rao
- Constituency: Khammam

Personal details
- Born: 10 December 1928 Bayyannagudum, Khammam District, British India(Now in Telangana)
- Died: 18 December 2018 (aged 90)
- Party: Indian National Congress
- Spouse: J. Indira Devi

Jalagam Kondala Rao was an Indian politician. He was elected to the Lok Sabha, the lower house of the Parliament of India from Khammam as a member of the Indian National Congress.
