= Lakshmi Kantamma =

Indian politician

Member of Parliament
- In office 1962 - 1977
- Preceded by: T. B. Vittal Rao
- Succeeded by: Jalagam Kondala Rao
- Constituency: Khammam

Personal details
- Born: 16 July 1924 Alampur, Telangana, India
- Died: 13 December 2007 (aged 83) Vijayawada, Andhra Pradesh, India
- Party: Indian National Congress
- Spouse: T. V. Subba Rao
- Relations: Smita (granddaughter)
- Children: 1 daughter
- Education: M.A in Economics (1947)

Tella Lakshmi Kantamma (1 August 1924 – 13 December 2007) was an influential Indian politician who served as a member of parliament from 1962 to 1977. She was also a political advisor to Prime Minister P.V Narasimha Rao.

== Early life ==
Born in Alampur village in Mahabubnagar District of Telangana, Tella Lakshmi Kantamma hailed from a large family of Kamma landlords.

She studied up to 5th class in Kurnool, and then her sister helped her in completing SSLC in Gudivada. She entered Madras Christian College to pursue intermediate studies, and completed B.A. in Machilipatnam. She later received a master's degree in economics in 1971. Like P.V Narasimha Rao, she was a writer and Sanskrit scholar.

She married Tella Venkata Subba Rao on 1 November 1944. He was then District Forest Officer in Anantapur; she was elected as secretary of Ladies Club. After that she completed her MA in Pachiappa College in Madras, when her husband went to England to undergo training as Assistant Conservator of Forests. On 5 June 1960 Lakshmi Kantamma and Subba Rao had a daughter – Jogulamba who was their only child. Singer Smita is her grand daughter.

== Political career ==
Her three decades of political life began with a claim for a position on the MLA ticket from Khammam seat in 1957. She was first denied the ticket on the grounds that she was the wife of a Government official, but she took this issue to the notice of Lal Bahadur Shastri and questioned whether they were looking at her as citizen of India or wife of an officer. Shastri secured the ticket for her, and she won the MLA seat. She was elected to Lok Sabha from Khammam in 1962, 1967, and 1971 as a member of Congress Party. She served as Executive Member of Parliament Committee when Jawaharlal Nehru was the Prime Minister. She opposed imposition of emergency in 1975 and joined Janata Party in 1977. She contested 1977 Lok Sabha election on Janata Party's ticket from Secunderabad but lost. She contested a bye-election for Lok Sabha from Secunderabad in 1979 but lost again.

During the China War in 1962, she not only learnt rifle shooting but also won 2nd prize. She was a member of Indian delegation from Parliament to visit Australia. In those days women were not allowed to become IAS officers. Lakshmi Kantamma convinced Indira Gandhi and got the barrier lifted. She raised the issue of enacting a law for 50% property right for women several times in Parliament. As member of the state election committee in 1972, she was instrumental in allotting tickets to 70 women and youth. Chekuri Kasaiah who faced defeat at her hands, recalls even now that there used to be huge crowds during her electioneering at Khammam in 1957. Khammam is a seat where Congress had lost its deposit in the previous election but Lakshmi Kantamma gave a tough fight, and lost only narrowly.

She was in the forefront of leaders who fought to secure Police Academy, BHEL, Visakhapatnam Steel Plant and Kothagudem Thermal Power Project. Her role in the election of V. V. Giri as President of India was mentioned by V. V. Giri in his autobiography. Though she was very close to Indira Gandhi, she opposed her when she imposed emergency. She declined various ministerial berths offered by Indira Gandhi as she felt people are of utmost importance than positions. She influenced the politics of those days as a co-worker with Vajpayee, Chandra Shekar, Morarji Desai, P. V. Narasimha Rao and Charan Singh. She was an important leader in Janata party and served as All India General Secretary of the party. She got elected as an MLA from Himayat Nagar constituency in Hyderabad. She declined the opportunity to become the Chief Minister of the State, and was instrumental for making P. V. Narasimha Rao as Chief Minister of A.P.

== Later life ==
She turned to spiritualism is the later part of her life, accepting Shri Shiva Balayogi Maharaj as her guru. She donated valuable properties to his trust and headed the trust for several years. She became a sadhvi.

To quote Rama Chandra Murthy, former editor, Andhra Jyothi, her role in politics is worth recording in political history. Starting from communist student movements and on to rubbing shoulders with Indira Gandhi, she played different roles very efficiently. She was committed to the principles she believed in, could speak out boldly what she believed in and never bowed her head and displayed self-confidence all through. She loved driving her jeep and was physically active until the tail end of her life.

She contributed articles for newspapers on current political and social developments till she was 82. She died on 13 December 2007.
