= Yalamanchili Radhakrishna Murthy =

Physician and politician

Dr. Y. Radhakrishna Murthy

Member of the Rajya Sabha
- In office 1996–2002

Personal details
- Born: Jamidinta village, Krishna district, India
- Died: 19 October 2013 Hyderabad, India
- Party: Communist Party of India (Marxist)
- Occupation: Physician

Yalamanchili Radhakrishna Murthy (died 19 October 2013), known as YRK, was an Indian medical doctor and politician, belonging to the Communist Party of India (Marxist).

== Student years ==
YRK was an activist in student movement. He became associated with the Communist Party of India during his student days. During the Telangana armed struggle his residence was used to host underground communist leaders and for storing weapons for the rebels. He finished his medical studies in Visakhapatnam in 1951. The following year he moved to Khammam.

== Jailed candidate ==
YRK was jailed five times. In the midst of the Emergency, he filed nomination papers to contest the 1977 Lok Sabha election whilst being in jail. He ran as the CPI(M) candidate for the Khammam Lok Sabha seat, finishing in second place with 122,628 votes (30.16% of the votes in the constituency).

== Parliamentarian ==
YRK became a CPI(M) Andhra Pradesh State Committee member in 1993. In 1996 YRK was elected to the Rajya Sabha (upper house of the Indian parliament). In the Rajya Sabha he was a member of the Medical and Health Parliamentary Committee. As a member of the Parliamentary Committee, he worked for the establishment of the Visakha Institute of Medical Sciences. In the following year he was included in the CPI(M) Andhra Pradesh State Secretariat.

== Naxal issue ==
YRK argued for a political solution to the Naxalite insurgency. In 2004 YRK was included in the 20-member Monitoring Committee to oversee the cease-fire between the Andhra Pradesh state government and the Communist Party of India (Marxist-Leninist) People's War. The CPI(M) did however disapprove of participating in the committee, and withdrew YRK from it.

== Later years ==
YRK resigned from political positions due to old age. YRK suffered a stroke on 10 October 2013, and died nine days later. He was 85 years old at the time. His body was transported to Khammam and kept at Manchikanti Bhavan. His body was cremated on 20 October 2013. Many political leaders from different parties as well as a large number of CPI(M) cadres attended the ceremony to pay their respect.
