= Palair Assembly constituency =

Constituency of the Telangana legislative assembly in India

Coordinates: 17.21°N 79.92°E

Palair
- Constituency No. 113 for the Telangana Legislative Assembly
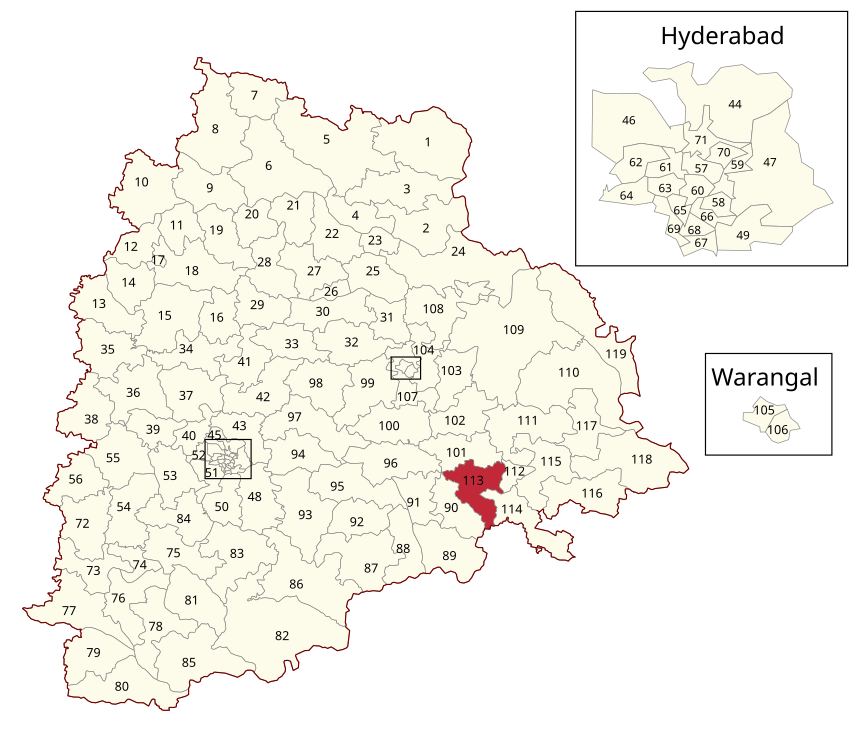
- Location of Palair Assembly constituency within Telangana

Constituency details
- Country: India
- Region: South India
- State: Telangana
- District: Khammam
- Lok Sabha constituency: Khammam
- Established: 1951
- Total electors: 4,72,898
- Reservation: None

Member of Legislative Assembly
- 3rd Telangana Legislative Assembly
- Incumbent Ponguleti Srinivas Reddy
- Party: INC
- Elected year: 2023

Palair Assembly constituency is a constituency of the Telangana Legislative Assembly, India. It is one of the ten constituencies in Khammam district. It is part of Khammam Lok Sabha constituency.

== Mandals ==
The Assembly constituency presently comprises the following mandals:

Mandal
Khammam Rural
Kusumanchi
Tirumalayapalem
Nelakondapalli

== Members of the Legislative Assembly ==
Year	Member	Political party
United Andhra Pradesh
1962	Kathula Santhiah	Indian National Congress
1967	Kathula Santhiah	Indian National Congress
1972	Kathula Santhiah	Indian National Congress
1978	Hassainu Potta Pinjara	Indian National Congress
1983	Bheemapaka Bhupathi Rao	Communist Party of India
1985	Baji Hanumanthu	Communist Party of India
1989	Sambani Chandra Sheker	Indian National Congress
1994	Venkata Veeratah Sandra	CPI(M)
1999	Sambani Chandra Sheker	Indian National Congress
2004	Sambani Chandra Sheker	Indian National Congress
2009	Ramreddy Venkat Reddy	Indian National Congress
Telangana Legislative Assembly
2014	Ramreddy Venkat Reddy	Indian National Congress
2016★	Thummala Nageshwar Rao	Telangana Rashtra Samithi
2018	Kandala Upender Reddy	Indian National Congress
2023	Ponguleti Srinivas Reddy	Indian National Congress

★by-election

== Election results ==
=== Telangana Legislative Assembly Election, 2023 ===
Telangana Assembly Elections, 2023: Palair (Assembly constituency)
Party	Candidate	Votes	%	±%
INC	Ponguleti Srinivas Reddy	127,820	58.94	
TRS	Kandala Upender Reddy	71,170	32.82	
CPI(M)	Thammineni Veerabhadram	5,308	2.45	
BSP	Allika Venkateswar Rao	2,095	0.97	
BJP	Nunna Ravikumar	1,815	0.84	
NOTA	None of the Above	520	0.24	
Majority		56,650	26.12	
Turnout		2,16,851		
INC hold		Swing		

=== Telangana Legislative Assembly Election, 2018 ===
Telangana Assembly Elections, 2018: Palair (Assembly constituency)
Party	Candidate	Votes	%	±%
INC	Kandala Upender Reddy	89,407	46.53	
TRS	Thummala Nageswara Rao	81,738	42.54	
CPI(M)	Battula Hymavathi	6,769	3.52	
Independent	Nandigama Raj Kumar	6,101	3.17	
NOTA	None of the Above	1,271	0.66	
Majority		7,669	3.99	
Turnout		1,92,164	92.09	
INC gain from TRS		Swing		

=== Telangana Legislative Assembly by-election, 2016 ===
The by-election was necessitated following the death of Congress member R. Venkat Reddy who won the seat in 2014. T. Nageshwar Rao of Telangana Rashtra Samithi won it with the biggest majority in the history of Palair constituency.

By-elections, 2016: Palair
Party	Candidate	Votes	%	±%
TRS	Thummala Nageswara Rao	94,940	55.5	
INC	Ramreddy Sucharitha Reddy	49,258	28.8	
CPI(M)	Pothineni Sudarshan Rao	15,538	9.1	
NOTA	None of the Above	2,785		
Majority		45,682	26.7	
Turnout		1,71,074	89.85	
TRS gain from INC		Swing		

=== Telangana Legislative Assembly election, 2014 ===
Telangana Assembly Elections, 2014: Palair (Assembly constituency)
Party	Candidate	Votes	%	±%
INC	Ramreddy Venkat Reddy	69,707	39.28	
TDP	Baby Swarna Kumari Maddineni	47,844	26.96	
CPI(M)	Pothineni Sudarshan Rao	44,245	24.93	
Independent	Naresh Reddy Ramasahayam	5,587	3.15	
TRS	Ravella Ravindra	4,041	2.28	
NOTA	None of the Above	783	0.44	
Majority		21,863	12.32	
Turnout		1,77,461	90.32	
INC hold		Swing		

== See also ==
- List of constituencies of Telangana Legislative Assembly
