= Ponguleti Srinivasa Reddy =

Indian politician (born 1965)

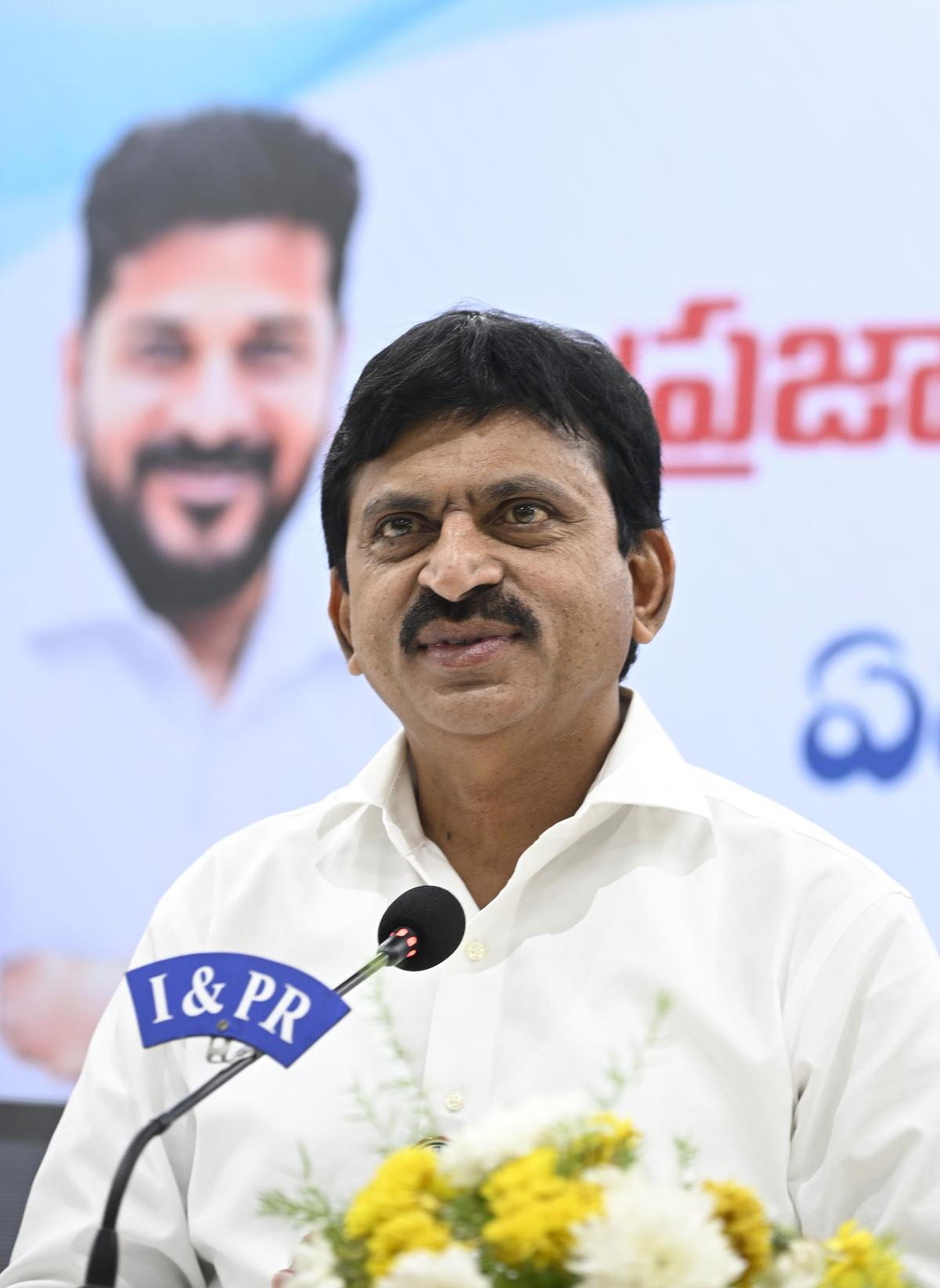

Minister of Housing, Revenue and Information & Public Relations Government of Telangana
- Incumbent
- Assumed office 07 December 2023
- Governor: Tamilisai Soundararajan (2023-2024); C.P. Radhakrishnan (Additional charge) (2024); Jishnu Dev Varma (2024-2026); Shiv Pratap Shukla ( 2026–present)
- Chief Minister: Anumula Revanth Reddy
- Preceded by: Vemula Prashanth Reddy (Housing & Revenue); Patnam Mahender Reddy (Information & Public Relations)

Member of Telangana Legislative Assembly
- Incumbent
- Assumed office 09 December 2023
- Preceded by: Kandala Upender Reddy
- Constituency: Palair

Member of Parliament, Lok Sabha
- In office 26 May 2014 – 23 May 2019
- Preceded by: Nama Nageswara Rao
- Succeeded by: Nama Nageswara Rao
- Constituency: Khammam, Telangana

Personal details
- Born: 28 October 1965 (age 60) Narayanapuram, Andhra Pradesh, India (now, Telangana)
- Party: Indian National Congress (2023 - Present)
- Other political affiliations: Bharat Rashtra Samithi (2016-2023); YSR Congress Party (2011-2016)
- Spouse: Ponguleti Madhuri

Ponguleti Srinivasa Reddy is an Indian politician currently serving as a Minister for Revenue, Housing, Information and Public Relations in Government of Telangana, since 7 December 2023. Ponguleti represented Khammam Lok Sabha constituency between 2014 and 2019.

== Political career ==
He won Lok Sabha election from Khammam as a YSRCP candidate in 2014.

He later changed to regional political party TRS (Telangana Rashtra Samithi). In the general elections of 2018. he supported the M.L.A. candidate Lingala Kamalraju on behalf of the TRS.

In 2023, Ponguleti Srinivasa Reddy was suspended from BRS party (formerly TRS), for alleged anti-party activities. Later he Joined in Congress on 2 July 2023 at ‘Telangana Jana Garjana’ public meeting held in Khammam in the presence of Rahul Gandhi.

In 2023 Telangana Assembly Election, Reddy elected from Palair Assembly Constituency with a huge Majority of 56,650 Votes. Reddy is currently serving as Cabinet Minister with Revenue & Housing and Information & Public Relations departments in the Government of Telangana.

== Election Statistics ==
	Year	Contested For	Party	Constituency	Opponent	Votes	Majority	Result	Reference
1	2014	MP	YSR Congress Party	Khammam	Nama Nageswara Rao (TDP)	4,22,434 - 4,10,230	+12,204	Won	
2	2023	MLA	Indian National Congress	Palair	Kandala Upender Reddy (BRS)	1,27,820 - 71,170	+56,650	Won	
