= Rapolu Ananda Bhaskar =

Indian politician

Member of Parliament Rajya Sabha
- In office 3 April 2012 (shifted to Telangana from AP on 2 June 2014) – 2 April 2018
- Succeeded by: Lingamaiah Yadav,
- Constituency: Telangana

Personal details
- Born: Rapolu Ananda Bhaskar; 15 January 1964 (age 62) Bombay, India
- Other political affiliations: Indian National Congress
- Spouse: Saroja
- Children: Priyanka and Adityaram
- Education: Osmania University (MA)
- Website: www.abrapolu.in

Rapolu Ananda Bhaskar (born 15 January 1964) is an Indian journalist turned politician of Telangana. He was elected to the Rajya Sabha from Andhra Pradesh. After Bifurcation of Andhra Pradesh he is allotted to Telangana state by draw of lots.

== Early life ==
He was born in Bombay in the Padmashali community but hails from Kodakandla village in Warangal in Telangana . He has a master's degree in Sociology from Osmania University in 1987.

== Career ==
He worked as a journalist before joining the Congress party in 1994. He worked as a back room manager at Congress party headquarters in AP, Gandhi Bhavan. He was leading the Telangana Congress Monitoring Group for attaining separate statehood for Telangana. He was General Secretary in APCC.

He was elected to the Rajya Sabha in 2012. He was handpicked by the ex-Congress party president, Sonia Gandhi. In 2019, he joined BJP in the presence of BJP national president Jagat Prakash Nadda and Finance Minister Arun Jaitely. He has resigned from BJP on 22 October 2022 and has joined TRS on October 26, in the presence of party's working president KTR. In 2024, he quit BRS and didn’t join any party.

== Personal life ==
He is married to Saroja and is blessed with a daughter, Priyanka and a son, Adityaram.

Rajya Sabha
Unknown	Member for Andhra Pradesh; 2012 – 2018	Incumbent
