= Ramasahayam Raghuram Reddy =

Indian politician

Member of Parliament, Lok Sabha
- Incumbent
- Assumed office 4 June 2024
- Preceded by: Nama Nageswara Rao
- Constituency: Khammam, Telangana

Personal details
- Born: Ramasahayam Raghuram Reddy; 19 February 1961 (age 65) Maripeda, Mahabubabad, Telangana, India
- Party: Indian National Congress
- Spouse: Late Kalpana Reddy
- Children: 1 Son
- Parent(s): Ramasahayam Surender Reddy, Jayamala Reddy

Ramasahayam Raghuram Reddy is an Indian politician and the elected candidate for Lok Sabha from Khammam Lok Sabha constituency. He is a member of the Indian National Congress.

Raghuram Reddy comes with a political lineage as he is the son of veteran Congress leader and former MP Ramasahayam Surender Reddy for four terms from Mahabubabad, Warangal and a MLA for another four terms from Dornakal constituency.

== Early life ==
Raghuram Reddy was born on 19 February 1961 in Hyderabad to Ramasahayam Surender Reddy and Jayamala Reddy. He completed B.Com from Nizam College, Hyderabad and PG in Diploma.

== See also ==
- 18th Lok Sabha
