= M. V. Mysura Reddy =

Indian politician

M. V. Mysoora Reddy

Member of Parliament, Rajya Sabha
- In office 2006-2012
- Preceded by: Vanga Geetha
- Succeeded by: Renuka Chowdary
- Constituency: Andhra Pradesh

Member of Legislative Assembly Andhra Pradesh
- In office 1999-2004
- Preceded by: Gandluru Veera Siva Reddy
- Succeeded by: Gandluru Veera Siva Reddy
- Constituency: Kamalapuram
- In office 1985 - 1994
- Preceded by: Vaddamani Venkata Reddy
- Succeeded by: Ganduluru Veera Siva Reddy
- Constituency: Kamalapuram

Personal details
- Born: 28 February 1949 (age 77) Niduzuvvi
- Party: YSR Congress Party, independent
- Children: 2

Dr. M. V. Mysoora Reddy (Mule Venkata Mysura Reddy) a politician from TDP is an Ex Member of the Parliament of India representing Andhra Pradesh in the Rajya Sabha, the upper house of the Indian Parliament.

Dr M. V. Mysura Reddy was born on 28 February 1949 in a village Niduzuvvi near Yerraguntla in Kadapa District (Now YSR District). His maternal uncle, who was a village head mentored him during his early political life. He stopped practicing medicine and entered politics in 1981 when he won as the Samiti President of Kamalapuram in Panchayat elections as independent candidate and later joined congress party. He later contested and won an assembly election as a congress candidate. Later, he stayed in congress for 25 years . He lost the 1983 elections and won the 1985, 1989 and 1999 elections. He lost in 1994 to the TDP candidate. During his Congress period he served as home minister and as transport minister in Sri Nedurumali Janardan Reddy's cabinet and in Kotla Vijay Bhaskar Reddy's cabinet. He quit Congress party and joined Telugu Desam Party. Later TDP sent him to Rajya Sabha as a Member of the Parliament. After joining TDP he lost parliament Loksabha elections two times. As TDP MP he complained to the Indian Defense minister A.K.Anthony to order a probe on the murkiness of multi-billion French Rafale aircraft deal.

After his Rajya sabha tenure he joined ysrcp after three years he resigned from YSRCP, and he is working for separate state hood for greater rayalaseema (Kurnool, Kadapa, Anantapur, Chittoor, Nellore and part of Prakasham districts) since 1981-1989 as samithe president and as MLA he led a movement for the development of rayalaseema as conveiner of rayalaseema joint action committee. During the separation of Andhra Pradesh state. He along with rayalaseema joint action committee members represented to Krishna committee and demanded not to separate the AP state if the separation is imminent then to divide the AP state into three states i e Telangana Andhra greater rayalaseema
