= B. Parthasaradhi Reddy =

Indian politician

Bandi Parthasaradhi Reddy

Member of Parliament, Rajya Sabha
- Incumbent
- Assumed office 22 June 2022
- Preceded by: Banda Prakash
- Constituency: Telangana

Personal details
- Party: Bharat Rashtra Samithi

Bandi Parthasaradhi Reddy is an Indian politician and a member of the Rajya Sabha, upper house of the Parliament of India from Telangana as a member of the BRS. Parthasaradhi Reddy is the richest Member of Parliament from Telangana, with a reported net worth of Rs 39,200 crore.

In 2024, Reddy was ranked 81st in Forbes' list of richest Indians, with a net worth of $3.95 billion.
