= Garikapati Mohan Rao =

Indian politician

Member of Parliament, Rajya Sabha
- In office 10 June 2014 – 9 June 2020
- Succeeded by: Suresh Reddy
- Constituency: Telangana

Personal details
- Born: 5 January 1948 (age 78) Warangal, Andhra Pradesh
- Party: Bharatiya Janata Party
- Other political affiliations: Telugu Desam Party
- Spouse: Shrimati Garikapati Sujatha
- As of 20 December, 2016

Garikapati Mohan Rao (born 5 January 1948 in Warangal, Andhra Pradesh) is an Indian politician of the Bharatiya Janata Party and represented Telangana State as a member of parliament, Rajya Sabha.

He completed a B.Sc. degree at C.K.M. College, Warangal. He joined the political party BJP on 20 June 2019.

== See also ==
- Rajya Sabha members from Telangana
