= Khammam Lok Sabha constituency =

Constituency of the Indian parliament in Telangana

Coordinates: 17.2°N 80.1°E

Khammam TG-17
- Lok Sabha constituency
- Khammam Lok Sabha constituency in Telangana

Constituency details
- Country: India
- Region: South India
- State: Telangana
- Assembly constituencies: Khammam; Palair; Madhira; Wyra; Sathupalle; Kothagudem; Aswaraopeta
- Established: 1952
- Reservation: None

Member of Parliament
- 18th Lok Sabha
- Incumbent Ramasahayam Raghuram Reddy
- Party: Indian National Congress
- Elected year: 2024

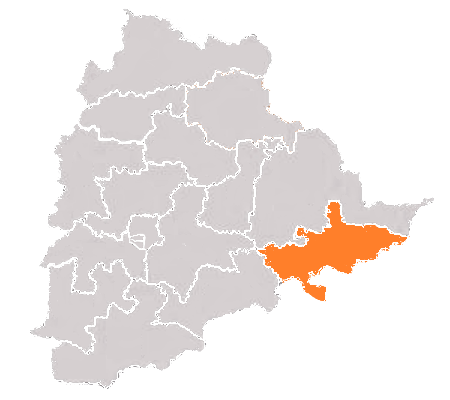
Map of the Indian Loksabha constituency of Khammam, Telangana

Khammam Lok Sabha constituency is one of the 17 Lok Sabha (Lower House of the Parliament) constituencies in Telangana state in southern India.

Ramasahayam Raghuram Reddy of Indian National Congress is currently representing the constituency for First time.

== Overview ==
Since its inception in 1952 Khammam seat is Congress strong hold where it has won 12 times various other political outfits like Communist Party of India, Telugu Desam Party, Communist Party of India (Marxist) and YSR Congress Party have won it during different general elections.

== Assembly segments ==
Khammam presently comprises the following Legislative Assembly segments:

No	Name	District	Member	Party	Leading (in 2024)
112	Khammam	Khammam	Thummala Nageswara Rao	INC	INC
113	Palair	Khammam	Ponguleti Srinivasa Reddy	INC	INC
114	Madhira (SC)	Khammam	Mallu Bhatti Vikramarka	INC	INC
115	Wyra (ST)	Khammam	Ramdas Maloth	INC	INC
116	Sathupalli (SC)	Khammam	Matta Ragamayee	INC	INC
117	Kothagudem	Bhadradri Kothagudem	Kunamneni Sambasiva Rao	CPI	INC
118	Aswaraopeta (ST)	Bhadradri Kothagudem	Jare Adinarayana	INC	INC

== Members of Parliament ==
Year	Member	Party
Hyderabad State
1952	T. B. Vittal Rao	People's Democratic Front
Andhra Pradesh
1957	T. B. Vittal Rao	Communist Party of India
1962	T. Lakshmi Kantamma	Indian National Congress
1967	T. Lakshmi Kantamma	Indian National Congress
1971	T. Lakshmi Kantamma	Indian National Congress
1977	Jalagam Kondala Rao	Indian National Congress
1980	Jalagam Kondala Rao	Indian National Congress
1984	Jalagam Vengala Rao	Indian National Congress
1989	Jalagam Vengala Rao	Indian National Congress
1991	P. V. Rangaiah Naidu	Indian National Congress
1996	Tammineni Veerabhadram	Communist Party of India (Marxist)
1998	Nadendla Bhaskara Rao	Indian National Congress
1999	Renuka Chowdhary	Indian National Congress
2004	Renuka Chowdhary	Indian National Congress
2009	Nama Nageswara Rao	Telugu Desam Party
Telangana
2014	Ponguleti Srinivas Reddy	YSR Congress Party
2019	Nama Nageswara Rao	Telangana Rashtra Samithi
2024	Ramasahayam Raghuram Reddy	Indian National Congress

== Election results ==
Vote share of Winning candidates
2024	61.29%
2019	49.78%
2014	35.68%
2009	45.39%
2004	50.63%
1999	35.85%
1998	40.30%
1996	42.82%
1991	44.20%
1989	49.68%
1984	44.70%
1980	42.13%
1977	51.30%
1971	36.94%
1967	53.12%
1962	49.78%
1957	44.27%
1952	53.82%

=== 2024 ===
2024 Indian general election: Khammam
Party	Candidate	Votes	%	±%
INC	R. Raghuram Reddy	766,929	61.29	▲26.25
BRS	Nama Nageswara Rao	299,082	23.90	▼25.88
BJP	Vinod Rao Tandra	118,636	9.48	▲7.68
NOTA	None of the above	6,782	0.54	▼0.85
Majority		467,847	37.39	▲22.65
Turnout		1,251,283	76.67	▲1.37
INC gain from TRS		Swing		

=== 2019 ===
2019 Indian general election: Khammam
Party	Candidate	Votes	%	±%
TRS	Nama Nageswara Rao	567,459	49.78	▲42.25
INC	Renuka Chowdhury	399,397	35.04	
CPI(M)	Boda Venkat	57,102	5.01	
BJP	Devaki Vasudeva Rao	20,488	1.80	
JSP	Narala Satyanarayana	19,315	1.69	
NOTA	None of the above	15,832	1.39	▲0.97
Majority		168,062	14.74	▲13.71
Turnout		1,139,848	75.30	▼6.90
TRS gain from YSRCP		Swing		

=== 2014 ===
2014 Indian general election: Khammam
Party	Candidate	Votes	%	±%
YSRCP	Ponguleti Srinivasa Reddy	422,434	35.68	
TDP	Nama Nageswara Rao	410,230	34.65	▼10.74
CPI	Kankanala Narayana	187,702	15.86	
TRS	Budan Baig Shaik	89,124	7.53	
JSP	Nagarjuna Cherukuru	5,002	0.42	
NOTA	None of the above	4,991	0.42	
Majority		12,204	1.03	▼11.00
Turnout		1,183,849	82.20	
YSRCP gain from TDP		Swing		

=== 2009 ===
2009 Indian general election: Khammam
Party	Candidate	Votes	%	±%
TDP	Nama Nageswara Rao	469,368	45.39	▲5.40
INC	Renuka Chowdhury	344,920	33.36	▼17.27
PRP	Jalagam Hemamalini	131,135	12.68	
LSP	Jupelli Satyanarayana	12,143	1.17	
Majority		124,448	12.03	▲1.39
Turnout				
TDP gain from INC		Swing		

=== 2004 ===
2004 Indian general election: Khammam
Party	Candidate	Votes	%	±%
INC	Renuka Chowdhury	518,047	50.63	▲14.78
TDP	Nama Nageswara Rao	409,159	39.99	▲5.06
IND	Aruna Chandra	50,619	4.95	
IND	Burra Venkanna	14,552	1.42	
Majority		108,888	10.64	▲9.72
Turnout		1,023,177	78.79	▲1.61
INC hold		Swing		

=== 1999 ===
1999 Indian general election: Khammam
Party	Candidate	Votes	%	±%
INC	Renuka Chowdhury	328,596	35.85	▼4.45
TDP	Baby Swarna Kumari Maddineni	320,198	34.93	
CPI(M)	Guguloth Dharma	184,422	20.12	▼18.89
IND	Aruna Chandra	52,971	5.78	
MCPI(S)	Matte Gurumurthy	15,129	1.65	
Majority		8,398	0.92	▼0.37
Turnout		948,088	77.18	▲2.53
INC hold		Swing		

=== 1998 ===
1998 Indian general election: Khammam
Party	Candidate	Votes	%	±%
INC	N. Bhaskara Rao	363,747	40.30	▲4.71
CPI(M)	Tammineni Veerabhadram	352,083	39.01	▼3.81
BJP	Dharavath Ravinder Naik	117,926	13.07	▲9.78
IND	Aruna Chandra	55,624	6.16	
Majority		11,664	1.29	▼5.94
Turnout		917,369	74.65	▲2.01
INC gain from CPI(M)		Swing		

=== 1996 ===
1996 Indian general election: Khammam
Party	Candidate	Votes	%	±%
CPI(M)	Tammineni Veerabhadram	374,675	42.82	▼0.55
INC	P. V. Rangayya Naidu	311,384	35.59	▼8.61
NTDP	Koneru Nageswara Rao	75,072	8.58	
IND	Sadineni Venkateswarlu	45,749	5.23	
BJP	Jayachandra Reddy Reddyvari	28,823	3.29	▲1.49
Majority		63,291	7.23	▲6.40
Turnout		895,441	72.64	▲2.46
CPI(M) gain from INC		Swing		

=== 1991 ===
1991 Indian general election: Khammam
Party	Candidate	Votes	%	±%
INC	P. V. Rangayya Naidu	316,186	44.20	▼5.48
CPI(M)	Tammineni Veerabhadram	310,268	43.37	▲1.27
IND	Gaddam Venkatramayya	45,999	6.43	
BJP	Ali Khadar Sayyad	12,852	1.80	
Majority		5,918	0.83	▼6.75
Turnout		732,650	70.18	▼8.20
INC hold		Swing		

=== 1989 ===
1989 Indian general election: Khammam
Party	Candidate	Votes	%	±%
INC	Jalagam Vengala Rao	388,461	49.68	▲4.98
CPI(M)	Y. Radhakrishna Murthy	329,209	42.10	▲21.79
IND	Gaddam Venkatramalah	49,862	6.38	
Majority		59,252	7.58	▼8.09
Turnout		813,657	78.38	▲3.11
INC hold		Swing		

=== 1984 ===
1984 Indian general election: Khammam
Party	Candidate	Votes	%	±%
INC	Jalagam Vengala Rao	261,056	44.70	▲2.57
CPI	Nallamala Prasad Rao	169,557	29.04	
CPI(M)	Parsa Satyanarayana	118,609	20.31	▼1.00
IND	Kandala Narsimha Reddy	30,126	5.16	
Majority		91,499	15.67	▼4.29
Turnout		596,809	75.27	▲5.26
INC hold		Swing		

=== 1980 ===
1980 Indian general election: Khammam
Party	Candidate	Votes	%	±%
INC(I)	Jalagam Kondala Rao	201,559	42.13	▼9.17
INC(U)	Upendraiah Samineni	106,076	22.17	
CPI(M)	Y. Radhakrishna Murthy	101,959	21.31	▼8.85
IND	Maddi China Venkat Reddy	32,378	6.77	
Majority		95,483	19.96	▼1.18
Turnout		491,008	70.01	▼0.37
INC(I) hold		Swing		

=== 1977 ===
1977 Indian general election: Khammam
Party	Candidate	Votes	%	±%
INC	Jalagam Kondala Rao	208,617	51.30	▲14.36
CPI(M)	Y. Radhakrishna Murthy	122,628	30.16	▲5.50
CPI	Nallamala Prasada Rao	72,530	17.84	
IND	K. I. Vidya Sagar	2,868	0.71	
Majority		85,989	21.14	▲16.73
Turnout		419,829	70.38	▲0.24
INC hold		Swing		

=== 1971 ===
1971 Indian general election: Khammam
Party	Candidate	Votes	%	±%
INC	Lakshmi Kantamma	137,830	36.94	▼16.18
TPS	Chekuri Kasaiah	121,369	32.53	
CPI(M)	Manchikanti Ram Kishan Rao	92,012	24.66	▲1.03
IND	Kama John	12,333	3.31	
Majority		16,461	4.41	▼25.08
Turnout		381,802	70.14	▼8.72
INC hold		Swing		

=== 1967 ===
1967 Indian general election: Khammam
Party	Candidate	Votes	%	±%
INC	Lakshmi Kantamma	200,534	53.12	▲3.34
CPI(M)	M. K. Rao	89,206	23.63	
CPI	R. Janakiramayya	67,068	17.76	▼28.35
ABJS	M. Narasimharao	20,730	5.49	
Majority		111,328	29.49	▲25.82
Turnout		392,684	78.86	▲3.61
INC hold		Swing		

=== 1962 ===
1962 Indian general election: Khammam
Party	Candidate	Votes	%	±%
INC	Lakshmi Kantamma	163,806	49.78	▲7.81
CPI	T. B. Vittal Rao	151,746	46.11	
IND	Golla Venkateswarlu	13,529	4.11	
Majority		12,060	3.67	▲1.37
Turnout		339,103	75.25	▲11.28
INC gain from PDF		Swing		

=== 1957 ===
1957 Indian general election: Khammam
Party	Candidate	Votes	%	±%
PDF	T. B. Vittal Rao	106,627	44.27	▼9.55
INC	Kolipak Kishan Rao	101,090	41.97	▲26.77
IND	P. Veeriah	23,842	9.90	
IND	Kondapalli Srinivasa Rao	9,278	3.85	
Majority		5,537	2.30	▼36.32
Turnout		240,837	63.97	▲10.89
PDF hold		Swing		

=== 1952 ===
1951–52 Indian general election: Khammam
Party	Candidate	Votes	%	±%
PDF	T. B. Vittal Rao	101,223	53.82	
INC	Gadiurm Krishna Reddy	28,591	15.20	
IND	K. Saayanarayana Rao	16,360	8.70	
Socialist	Devulopalli Ramanuja Rao	15,527	8.26	
IND	Ram Kishore	13,332	7.09	
IND	R. Shankarayya	13,031	6.93	
Majority		72,632	38.62	
Turnout		188,064	53.08	
PDF win (new seat)				

== Trivia ==
- Jalagam Vengala Rao, former Chief Minister of Andhra Pradesh represented the constituency in Eighth and Ninth Lok Sabha respectively.
- Nadendla Bhaskara Rao, former Chief Minister of Andhra Pradesh represented the constituency in Twelfth Lok Sabha.

== See also ==
- Khammam district
- List of constituencies of the Lok Sabha
