= Nama Nageswara Rao =

Indian politician

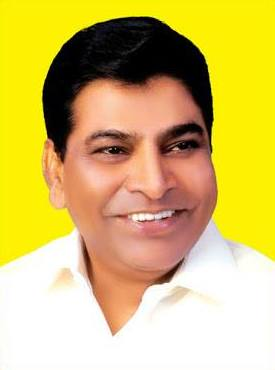

Member of Parliament, Lok Sabha
- In office 23 May 2019 – 4 June 2024
- Preceded by: Ponguleti Srinivas Reddy
- Succeeded by: Ramasahayam Raghuram Reddy
- Constituency: Khammam
- In office 16 May 2009 – 16 May 2014
- Preceded by: Renuka Chowdhury
- Succeeded by: Ponguleti Srinivas Reddy
- Constituency: Khammam

Personal details
- Born: 15 March 1957 (age 69) Balapala, Mahabubabad, Telangana, India
- Party: Bharat Rashtra Samithi (since 2019)
- Other political affiliations: Telugu Desam Party (until 2019)
- Spouse: Nama Chinnamma
- Children: 3

Nama Nageswara Rao (born 15 March 1957 in Balapala, Mahabubabad, Telangana) is an Indian politician, and a member of the 15th Lok Sabha of India.

Before becoming a member of the Lok Sabha, Nageswara Rao ran the infrastructure company Madhucon Projects. When he was a candidate for the Lok Sabha in 2009, he had total assets worth over Rp 1.73 billion ($38.4 million, £23.3 million), making him the wealthiest candidate.

Nageswara Rao had stood for election in 2004 for the Khammam constituency, but lost to the incumbent Renuka Chowdary by over 100,000 votes.

In May 2009, Nageswara Rao was elected to the Lok Sabha to represent the Khammam constituency, with a majority of 124,949 votes from Khammam constituency defeating Union Minister Renuka Chowdhary.

Nageswara Rao was unanimously elected Telugu Desam Parliamentary Party leader at a meeting held in the presence of the party president N. Chandrababu Naidu in May 2009.

Nageswara Rao is married to Nama Chinnamma, and has two sons and a daughter.

== Political statistics ==
	Year	Contested For	Party	Constituency	Opponent	Votes	Majority	Result
1	2004	MP	TDP	Khammam	Renuka Chowdhary (INC)	409159 - 518047	-108888	Lost
2	2009	MP	TDP	Khammam	Renuka Chowdhary (INC)	469368 - 344920	124448	Won
3	2014	MP	TDP	Khammam	Ponguleti Srinivas Reddy (YSRCP)	410230 - 422434	-12204	Lost
4	2018	MLA	TDP	Khammam	Puvvada Ajay Kumar (BRS)	91769 - 102760	-10991	Lost
5	2019	MP	TRS	Khammam	Renuka Chowdhary (INC)			Won

== Khammam Lok Sabha ==
In the 2019 elections, Nama Nageswar Rao (62) won and will represent the Khammam Lok Sabha constituency in Parliament for the second time.

== Overseas engagements ==
In June 2009, when Indian students were being attacked in Australia, Nageswara Rao had visited Melbourne, Australia along with then MLA Revanth Reddy to meet with International students from India. Nageswara Rao had visited hospitals, and travelled in trains and public transport in Melbourne to meet victims, and interact with Indian students in Australia, to get a better understanding of the situation.

Nageswara Rao visited the Victorian Parliament and met with then Victorian Opposition Leader Ted Baillieu to raise concerns about attacks on Indian students in Melbourne, Australia. Earlier, in July 2009, Rao had met with Baillieu during his visit to Delhi to follow up on the same issue.

Party political offices
Preceded by	Leader of the Telugu Desam Party in the 15th Lok Sabha; 2009-2014	Succeeded by Thota Narasimham
