= Kusumanchi =

- Village
- Location in Telangana, India Kusumanchi (India)
- Coordinates: 17.22631°N 79.96685°E
- Country: India
- State: Telangana
- District: Khammam

Government
  - Type: Municipal corporation

Population (2001)
  - Total: 63,336

Languages
  - Official: Telugu
- Time zone: UTC+5:30 (IST)
- Postal code: 507159
- Vehicle registration: TS
- Website: telangana.gov.in

Kusumanchi is a village in Khammam district of Telangana in India. It is the headquarters of the Kusumanchi mandal.

== Population ==
As per 2011 Census, the town has a population of 11,563.

== Literacy ==
Kusumanchi village has a literacy rate of 63.02% according to the 2011 Census.
