= Yerrasanivari Banjar =

- Village
- Location in Andhra Pradesh, India
- Coordinates: 17°06′N 80°36′E
- Country: India
- State: Andhra Pradesh

Population (2011)
  - Total: 400

Languages
  - Official: Telugu
- Time zone: UTC+5:30 (IST)
- PIN: 507164
- Telephone code: (91) 08761
- Sex ratio: 1:1 ♂/♀
- Literacy: 69%
- Lok Sabha constituency: Khammam
- Vidhan Sabha constituency: Sathupalli

Yerrasanivari Banjar (YS.Banjar) is a small village located adjacent to medium water project called as Lanka Sagar. It comes under the Mandal of Vemsoor in Andhra Pradesh.

== Library ==
The library of Yerrasanivari Banjar village has started with the support of its alumni especially Apps.

== Administration ==
The village is administrated by panchayat raj system. Due to very less population officials combined Yerrasanivari Banjar with other villages adjacent to it like Guduru, Moddulugudem to form one panchayath, The elections for this is going to conduct on 26 July 2013.
