= Rajugudem =

- Village
- Location in Telangana
- Coordinates: 17°09′22″N 80°43′45″E
- Country: India
- State: Telangana

Population (2011)
  - Total: 500

Languages
  - Official: Telugu
- Time zone: UTC+5:30 (IST)
- PIN: 507302
- Telephone code: (91) 08761
- Vehicle registration: AP20
- Sex ratio: 1:1 ♂/♀
- Literacy: 69%
- Lok Sabha constituency: Khammam
- Vidhan Sabha constituency: Sathupalli
- Website: www.rajugudem.com

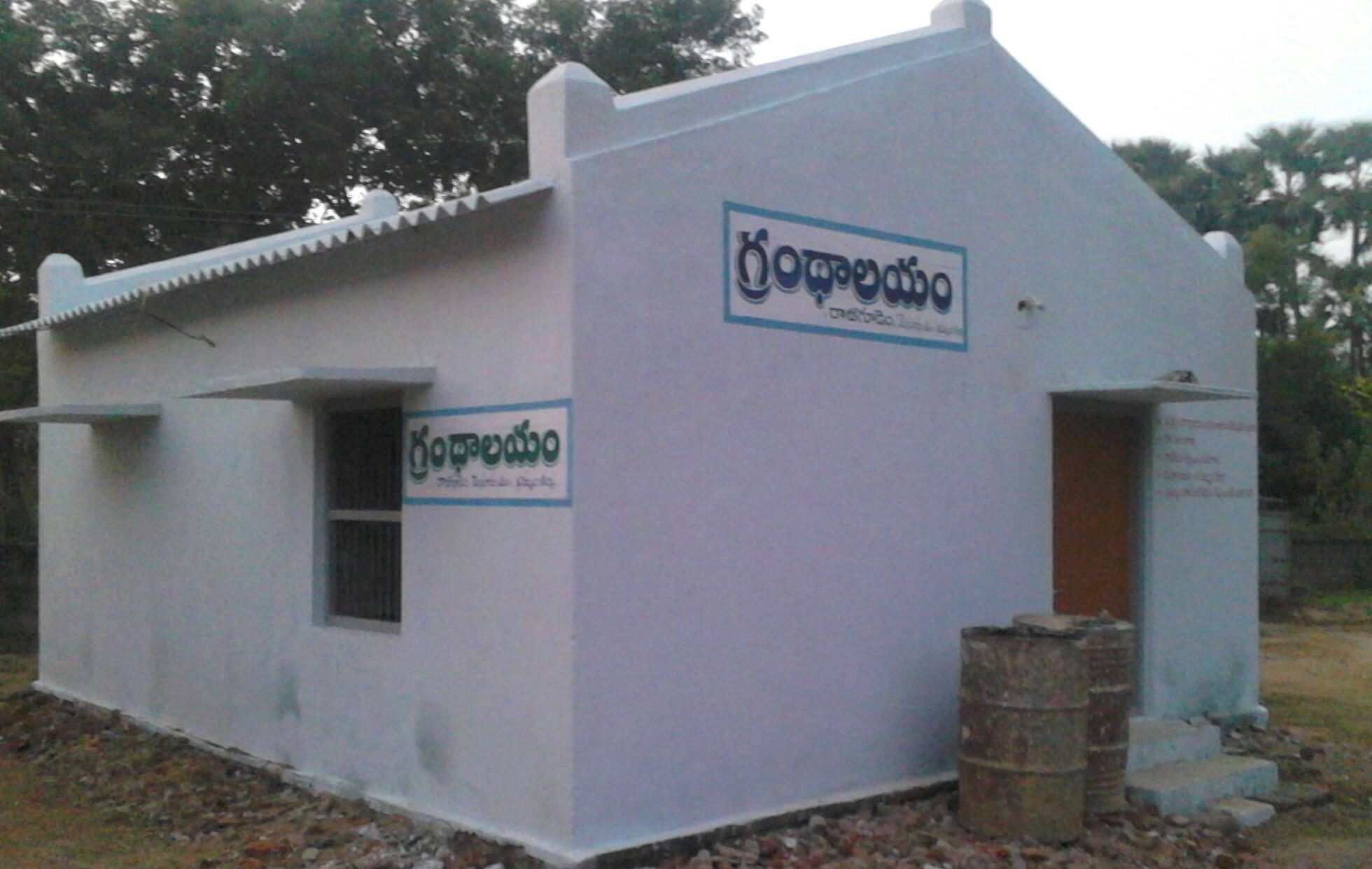
Rajugudem Village Library

Rajugudem (Telugu: రాజుగుడెం) is a small village located adjacent to the Lanka Sagar Dam. It falls under the Mandal Parishad of Vemsoor in the Indian State of Telangana.

== History ==
The village was originally located in Paturu, but it was relocated to its current location in 1964 during the construction of the Lanka Sagar Dam, which was built to provide water for drinking and irrigation for local villagers. As a result of the construction of the dam, the old settlement in Paturu was submerged, causing damage to the village and surrounding farmland. Compensation has been paid to those affected by the flooding.

== Administration ==
The village is being administrated by the Panchayat Raj system. Due to its sparse population, officials combined Rajugudem with the neighboring village, Chowdavaram to form one Panchayath.

The Panchayat elections for this constituency were conducted on 30 January 2019.
