= Hardik =

Hardik is a Hindu male given name. It is an adjective which means "from the heart" (दिलसे) in Hindi; "hard" (हार्द) is Hindi for "heart". Notable people with the name include:

- Hardik Mehta (Indian writer and director)
- Hardik Pandya (Indian cricketer)
- Hardik Patel (Indian political activist)
- Hardik Patel (Indian cricketer)
- Hardik Rathod (Indian cricketer)
- Hardik Sethi (Indian cricketer)
- Hardik Singh (Indian field hockey player)
- Hardik Shah (Indian civil servant)
- Hardik Tamore (Indian cricketer)
