= Rohini Sindhuri =

Indian bureaucrat (born 1984)

Rohini Sindhuri Dasari
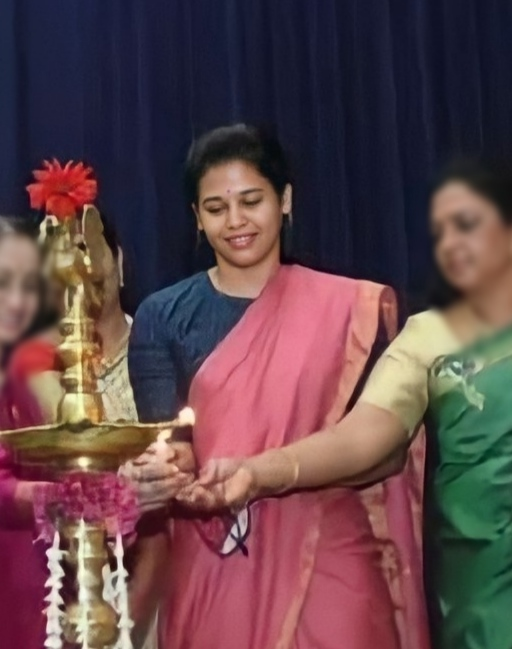
- Sindhuri inaugurating Women's Day celebration in Mysore, 2021

Secretary of MSME and Mines Bangalore
- Special Secretary to Govt Government of Karnataka
- Assumed office 27/10/2023

Personal details
- Born: Rohini Sindhuri Dasari; 30 May 1984 (age 42) Rudraksha Pally, Sathupalli, Khammam, Andhra Pradesh, (present-day Telangana) India
- Spouse: Sudhir Reddy
- Education: B.Tech in Chemical Engineering
- Occupation: Civil servant

Rohini Sindhuri Dasari (born 30 May 1984) is an Indian bureaucrat. She is an officer of the Indian Administrative Service (IAS) belonging to the Karnataka cadre from the 2009 batch.

== Early life ==
Sindhuri was born in Telangana. She completed her B.Tech. in Chemical Engineering. And she was selected as an IAS officer of the 2009 batch.

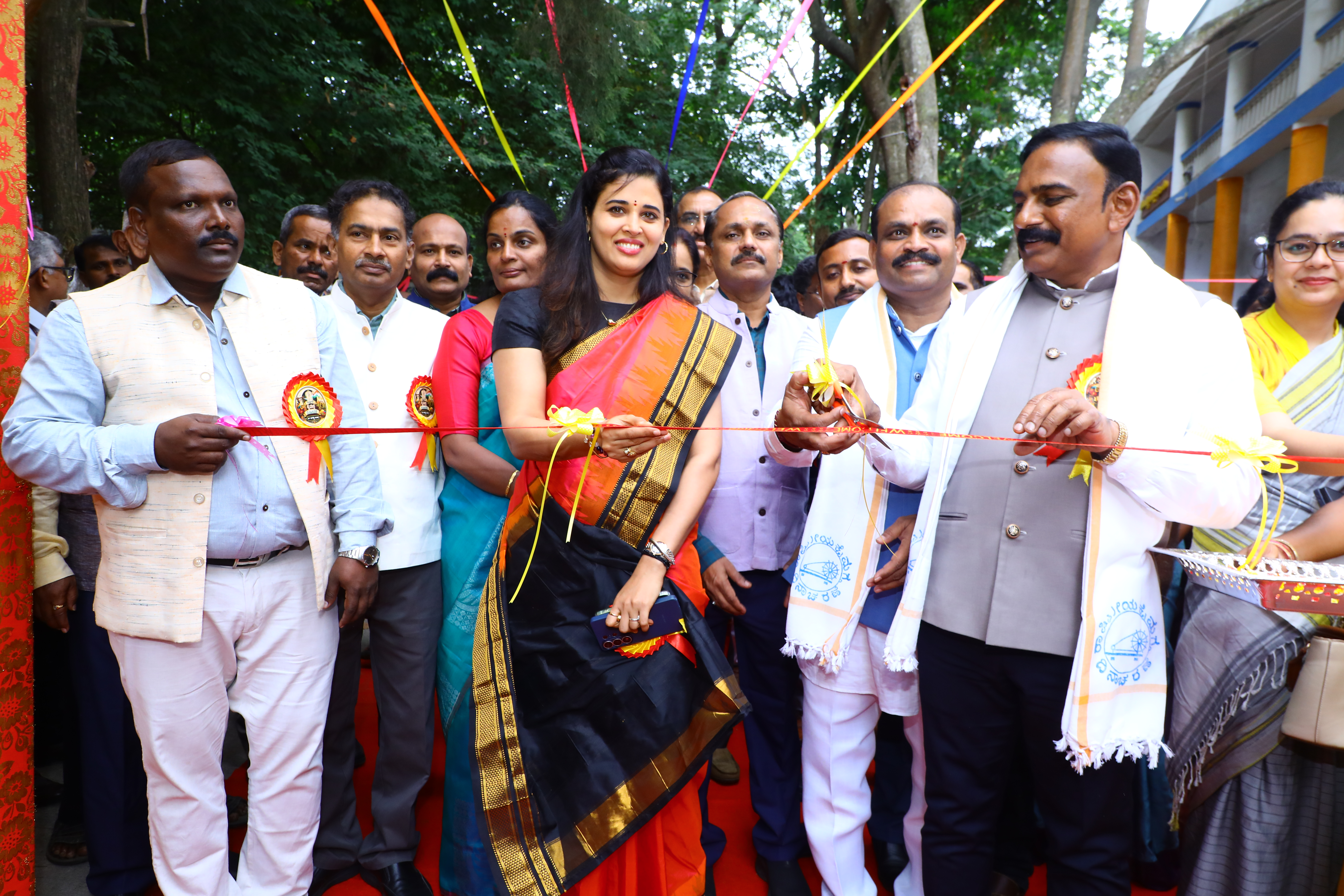
Secreatary Rohini Sindhuri Inaugurating 12th Handlooms Day at Bengaluru

== Career ==
Sindhuri's first posting as a civil servant was as the assistant commissioner in Tumakuru. She then worked as the Director of Rural Development & Panchayat Raj Department, Self Employment Project, Bangalore till 2014.

She was subsequently posted as Deputy Commissioner of Hassan in July 2017.

She was also posted as Deputy Commissioner of Mysore.

After a gap of 7 months, the Karnataka Government appointed her as Chief Editor for the Karnataka Gazette Department.

While working in Hindu Religious Institutions and Charitable Endowments Department as the State Hindu Religious and Charitable Endowments Commissioner, she collaborated with the then Muzarai Minister Smt. Shashikala Annasaheb Jolle to launch the Daiwa Sankalpa initiative which aimed to develop major Group A temples across Karnataka. A comprehensive Master Plan for all major temples in the state was charted out under this initiative, focusing on the holistic development and improvement of temple infrastructure and services.

Govt of Karnataka initiated a subsidy program for pilgrims visiting Kashi. Leveraging the new Bharath Gaurav Scheme of the Government of India, the State Hindu Religious and Charitable Endowments department arranged the Bharat Gaurav Kashi Yatra Special Train from Bangalore. Prime Minister Narendra Modi inaugurated its first journey.

== Controversies ==
In 2023, she was accused of sharing intimate photos to senior officers by D Roopa, a senior IPS officer serving in Karnataka Government. Earlier, she was accused of damaging the DC’s official residence by building a pool. The residence is a heritage building. She was also accused of purchasing sub-standard bags at an inflated price, which led to the state government ordering a probe against her She was also accused of serious corruption by an MLA. In a letter to the Karnataka state government, D Roopa urged the department to take action on the multiple cases of corruption against Sindhuri, including violation of All India Service Conduct Rules. Both the officers were transferred subsequently.

In 2022 and 2024, Singer Lucky Ali who resides in Bangalore accused Sindhuri and her husband Sudhir Reddy of trying to illegally encroach his Bangalore property located in Yelahanka.

In 2015, there were controversies surrounding her following the suicide of D. K. Ravi IAS.
