= Haryana Financial Corporation =

State owned Indian financial agency

Haryana Financial Corporation (HFC)
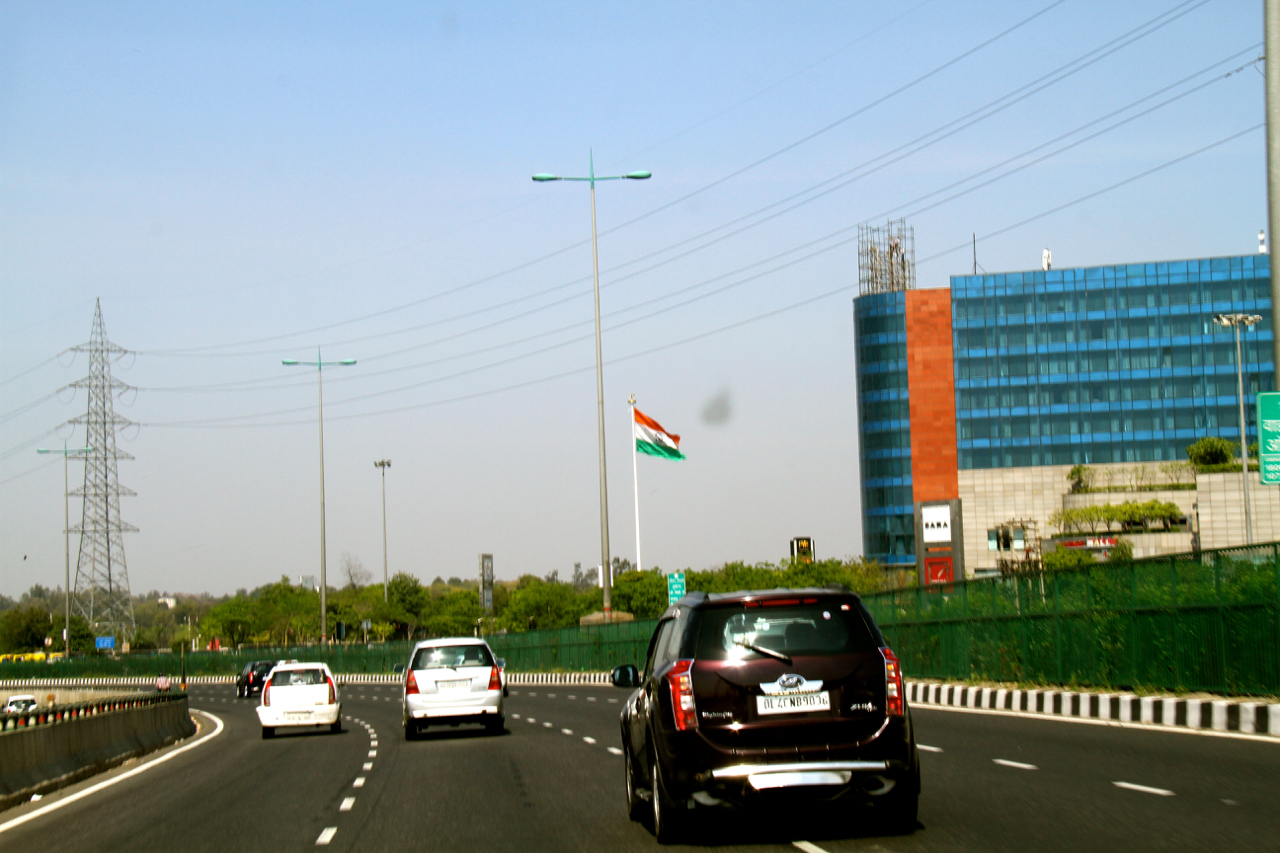
- Haryana's Industrial park near IGI Airport

State agency overview
- Formed: 1 April 1967
- Jurisdiction: Government of Haryana
- Headquarters: 30 Bays Building, Ground Floor, Sector 17-C, Chandigarh, Haryana, India; 30.7398339°N 76.782702°E
- Minister responsible: Rajesh Khullar
- Parent department: Department of Industries & Commerce, Haryana
- Website: www.hfcindia.org

Haryana Financial Corporation (HFC) (est. 1 April 1967) is a state-owned agency of the government of Haryana in the Indian state of Haryana, which was founded to provide the integrated finances to small- and medium-sized enterprises to boost economic growth. It offers several fund and non-fund based financial services on real fast track basis for ensuring high growth in a short period for setting up new industrial units and for the expansion and diversification of the existing industries.

Related government-owned agency, HSIIDC, was formed to develop integrated industrial, commercial, special economic zones (SEZ)s, technology parks, Integrated Multimodal Logistics Hubs, road, rail, sports and public infrastructure in the state of Haryana in joint venture or public–private partnership. Various universities, educational and training institutes, including the nation's first skills university Haryana Vishwakarma Skill University, provide the human resources to capitalise on the finances offered by the HFC and the infrastructure created by the HSIIDC. Among the related initiatives to boost growth, Haryana was the first state to introduce Labour Policy in 2005, and Land Pooling Policy in 2017.

HSVP is another related government-owned agency responsible for the urban development.

== History ==
HFC was formed on 1 April 1967 by the Department of Industries & Commerce, Haryana to promote Small and medium-sized enterprises for rapid industrialisation.

== HSIIDC organisation ==
It has branches at various district headquarters of the state.

== See also ==
- Haryana Khadi and Village Industries Board
- Economic development in India
- Agriculture in India
- Automotive industry in India
- Business process outsourcing to India
- Cinema industry of India
- Information technology in India
- Textile industry in India
- Delhi Financial Corporation
