= Chowdavaram OW =

- Village
- Location in Telangana
- Coordinates: 17°09′22″N 80°43′45″E
- Country: India
- State: Telangana
- Established: approx 100 year back
- Founder: Karanam Jagannadha Rao Nizam Period

Government
  - Type: Panchayat
  - Body: Sarpanch

Languages
  - Official: Telugu
- Time zone: UTC+5:30 (IST)
- PIN: 507302
- Telephone code: (91) 08761
- Sex ratio: 1:1 ♂/♀
- Literacy: 69%
- Lok Sabha constituency: Khammam
- Vidhan Sabha constituency: Vemsoor 1952-1962
- Vidhan Sabha constituency: Sathupalli

Chowdavaram OW is a small village in Vemsoor mandal, Khammam district, Telangana, India.
