= Kandukur (disambiguation) =

Kandukur or Kandukuru may refer to:

- Kandukur, a town in Prakasam district, Andhra Pradesh, India
  - Kandukur revenue division, an administrative division in Prakasam district, Andhra Pradesh, India
- Kandukuru, Khammam district, a village in Khammam district, Telangana, India
- Kandukur, Ranga Reddy district, a village in Ranga Reddy district, Telangana, India

== See also ==
- Kandukuri (disambiguation)
