= Carterpuri =

Village in Haryana, India

Carterpuri village (Daulatpur Nasirabad village)
- Village
- Location in Haryana, India Carterpuri village (India)
- Coordinates: 28.5069642°N 77.0427737°E
- Country: India
- State: Haryana
- Region: Haryana
- District: Gurgaon
- Founder: Late Mohar Singh Yadav
- Elevation: 223 m (732 ft)

Languages
  - Official: Hindi
- Time zone: UTC+5:30 (IST)
- PIN: 122017
- Vehicle registration: HR-26
- Website: haryana.gov.in

Carterpuri (formerly Daulatpur Nasirabad) is a village in Gurgaon district of Haryana, India. This village is very close to Bijwasan in South Delhi and is around 6 km away from Gurgaon railway station. In January 1978, the then US President Jimmy Carter along with his family visited the village with then Chief Minister of Haryana Devi Lal.

== History ==
The village was originally known as Daulatpur Nasirabad village. In 1978, it was renamed as Carterpuri in honour of the 39th United States President Jimmy Carter on the advice of then Indian Prime Minister Morarji Desai. Carter's mother had previously visited the village in the late 1960s as a member of the Peace Corps. President Carter visited the village on 3 January 1978 and donated money as well as a television set.

While Jimmy Carter was the United States president, there was a regular exchange of correspondence between the White House and the Village Council. The U.S. Ambassador came with gifts on 3 January and women would prepare 'halwa-puri' on that day. The haveli became a part of any American tourist's itinerary between 1978 and 1981.

== Social developments ==
Since Gurgaon's uncontrolled urbanization and increasing population, Carterpuri has been swallowed by the city's growth. The issues are illegal constructions, bad sanitary living conditions, and illiteracy of the migrant workers. Several NGOs, like Vishnu Charitable Trust, have taken the initiative in 2008 to bring positive changes in the area.

The first seed of its social involvement was sown in October 2008 when Rajesh Khullar, the then Commissioner of Gurgaon Municipal Corporation asked the Vishnu Charitable Trust, headed by Dr. Lokesh Abrol, to develop a shelter for stray cows with support from the civic body. The Kamdhenudham and Nandidham Gaushalas came up.

An illegal toxic waste dump was transformed to a green environment. Aravindam Foundation, Haryali and Vishnu Caritable Trust joined hands under the Campaign: 'Let us learn to grow with our environment' to create greenery on that dump. The place is now the most beautiful place in Gurgaon because of its green environment. 1000 trees has been planted and cared for.

After completion of construction of the Gaushalas in 2012, the site office and temporary sheds have been set up to create Gurukul Kalpataru to serve as a place for non-formal education for the underprivileged children of Carterpuri. Part of the 8 acres land has been converted to a lawn and playground serving as the only escape from the polluted and busy roads.

In 2014, Haatmake unit was created in the Gaushala. Its purpose is skills development and training for the women of Carterpuri community aiming at developing their financial sustainability.
