= Haryana State Industrial and Infrastructure Development Corporation =

Indian state-owned agency

Haryana State Industrial and Infrastructure Development Corporation (HSIIDC)
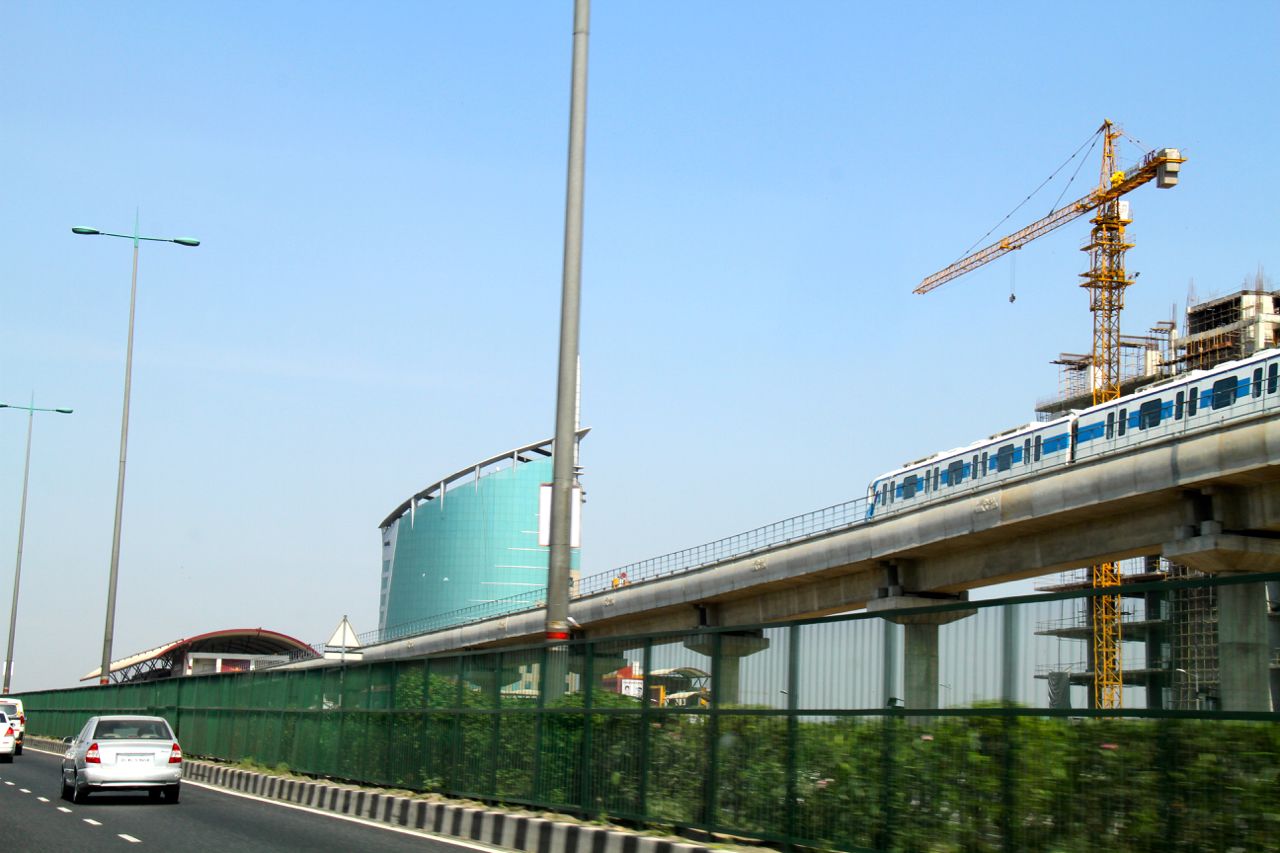
- HSIIDC Industrial Park on NH 48

State agency overview
- Formed: 8 March 1967; 59 years ago
- Jurisdiction: Government of Haryana
- Headquarters: C-13-14, Sector 6, Panchkula, Haryana, India; 30.706103°N 76.853988°E
- Parent department: Department of Industries & Commerce, Haryana
- Website: hsiidc.org.in

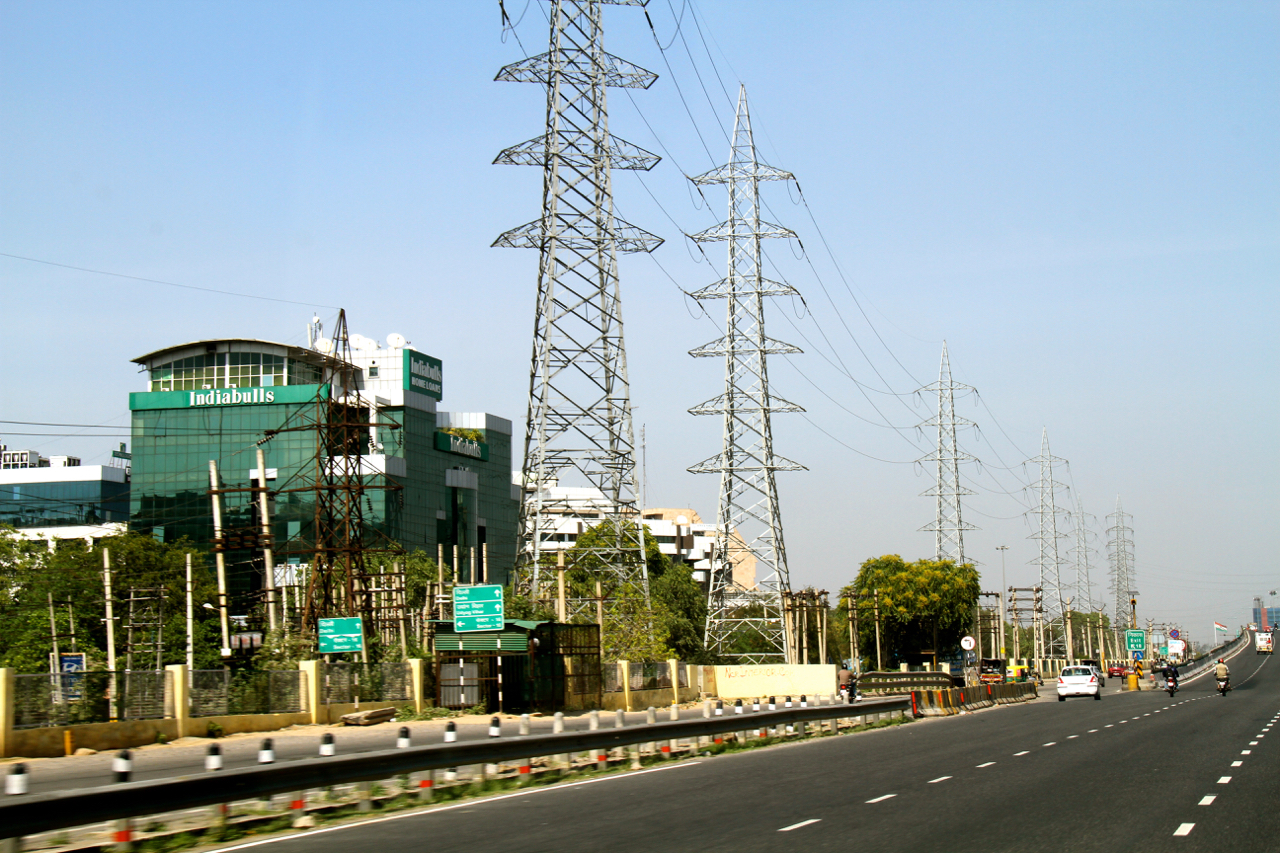
HSIIDC Industrial park on NH 48.

Haryana State Industrial and Infrastructure Development Corporation (HSIIDC) (established 8 March 1967), formerly Haryana State Industrial Development Corporation (HSIDC), headquartered at Panchkula, is a 100% state-owned agency of the government of Haryana in the Indian state of Haryana. For ease of doing business, Haryana is the first state in India to introduce a labour policy in 2005 and Land Pooling Policy in 2017, for which HSIIDC acts as the nodal agency. Haryana Financial Corporation provides financial assistance for setting up new industrial units and for the expansion and diversification of the existing industries. Various universities, educational and training institutes, including the nation's first skills university Haryana Vishwakarma Skill University, provide the human resources to capitalise on the infrastructure created by the HSIIDC.

HSVP is a related government owned agency responsible for the urban development.

== History ==
Haryana State Industrial Development Corporation (HSIDC), was formed on 8 March 1967 by the Department of Industries & Commerce, Haryana to promote medium and large industries for rapid industrialisation. HSIDC was renamed to the Haryana State Industrial and Infrastructure Development Corporation (HSIIDC) in 2005.

== HSIIDC organisation ==
=== Objectives ===
HSIIDC was formed to develop integrated industrial, commercial, special economic zones (SEZ)s, technology parks, Integrated Multimodal Logistics Hubs, road, rail, sports and public infrastructure in the state of Haryana in joint venture or public–private partnership. HSIIDC develops the basic infrastructure facilities such as internal roads, water supply, external electrification and affluent disposal system and then allots the industrial plots. Area in Haryana with they have well-developed infrastructure have easier access to markets for raw materials and finished products, credit, skilled labour, etc., hence HSIIDC has formed several subsidiaries to develop infrastructure in various sectors across the state.

=== Divisions ===
The authority has divided the districts of Haryana into four divisions or zones except Gurugram.

- Infrastructure planning
- Industrial Area development
- Real estate, Mining, Sports infrastructure development
- Business Development and Public Relations
- Grievances resolution
- General Administration (including HR, Finance and Legal)
- Information technology and Library
- Audit

=== Industrial clusters and theme parks ===
Haryana has developed at least 11 specialized Industrial Clusters and Theme Parks in the state of Haryana.

- Textile Hub, Panipat
- IIDC Narwana in Jind
- Food Park, Saha in Ambala
- Growth Centre, Saha in Ambala
- International Horticulture Market at Ganaur in Sonipat, 3 km northeast of Sonipat and 64 northeast of Delhi will be established under Haryana International Horticulture Marketing Corporation Limited (HIHMC).
- Footwear Park, Bahadurgarh
- Apparel Park, Barhi in Sonipat
- Theme Park, Kundli in Sonipat
- Electronic Hardware Technology Park, Kundli in Sonipat
- EPIP (Export Promotion Industrial Plots), Kundli in Sonipat
- Food Park, Rai in Sonipat
- Mega Food Park, at Rai, Sonipat
- Gurugram Flower Mandi, with assistance of Netherland, was work-in-progress as of 2020.

==== Mega food parks ====
Haryana, as a food surplus state, is vital for India's and global food security which also brings economic benefits to the state.

Mega Food Parks are approved by the Union Ministry of Food Processing Industries (MOFPI) which provides grants up to Rs 50 crores for each food park to a consortium of companies.

- Approved Mega Food Parks of Haryana are:
  - Hafed Mega Food Park at IMT Rohtak on NH-9 is under implementation.
  - HSIIDC Mega Food Park at Rai, Sonipat is under implementation
- Proposed, but not yet approved by the MOFPI, are as follows
  - Sirsa, as northwest Haryana hub, especially for citrus products
  - Hisar Airport commercial zone, as western Haryana hub, especially a hub for air cargo and international exports
  - HMT Pinjore commercial zone, as northeast Haryana hub, especially a hub for apples from JK, Himachal and Uttrakhand
  - Nangal Choudhary in Mahendragarh, as South Haryana hub for supplies to Rajasthan
  - Uttawar on Delhi–Mumbai Expressway, as hub for supplies to NCR and Agra-Mathura

==== Multi-Modal Logistics Parks of India ====
Multi-Modal Logistics Parks in India (MMLPI) is a government of India initiative to lower the logistics cost and time, enhance value add and boost economy. As of July 2021, MoRTH has planned to develop 35 MMLPs under Public-Private Partnership (PPP) in Design, Build, Finance, Operate and Transfer (DBFOT) mode. Based on the detailed project report (DPR), feasibility study and approved bidding document, the tender will be invited from companies. The bidding documents (The Model Concession Agreement and Request for Proposal) is being finalised for these 35 MMLPs, each of which will have a minimum area of 100 acres (40.5 hectares), with various modes of transport access, and comprising mechanized warehouses, specialized storage solutions such as cold storage, facilities for mechanized material handling and inter-modal transfer container terminals, and bulk and break-bulk cargo terminals. Logistics parks will further provide value-added services such as customs clearance with bonded storage yards, quarantine zones, testing facilities, and warehousing management services. Provisions will also be made for late-stage manufacturing activities such as kitting and final assembly, grading, sorting, labelling and packaging activities, re-working, and returns management.

Each MMLP Among these MMLP, Haryana has 1 following MMLP:

- Hisar Multi-Modal Logistics Parks, based at Hisar Airport.

Additional following MMLP are at planning stages:

- Sirsa
- Jind-Narwana
- HMT Pinjore
- Ganaur in Sonipat
- Loharu
- Nangal Chaudhary in Mahendragarh
- Nuh or Uttawar in South Haryana near DFC

=== Industrial estates and townships ===
An industrial are developed on at least 1500 acres of contiguous land is defrined as the "Industrial Estate" (IE), smaller industrial areas are called "Industrial Model Township" (IMT – denoted by an asterisk or star symbol) and an IT Park (denoted by double asterisk or star symbol). Haryana has at least 24 IEs, 8 IMT and 1 IT Park including the following:

- Ambala
  - Ambala Industrial estate
  - Saha Ambala Growth Centre Industrial estate
- Faridabad
  - Faridabad Industrial estate
- Gurugram
  - Udhyog Vihar Gurugram Industrial estate
  - Sohna IMT*
  - Roz-ka-Meo Industrial estate at Raisika
- Jind
  - Jind Industrial estate
  - Narwana IMT*
- Karnal
  - Karnal Industrial estate
- Mahendragarh
  - Narnaul Industrial estate
- Panchkula
  - Barwala Industrial estate
  - Kalka Industrial estate
  - Panchkula IMT*
  - Panchkula IT Park**
- Panipat
  - Panipat Industrial estate
- Rewari
  - Bawal IMT*
  - Dharuhera Industrial estate
  - Manesar IMT*
- Jhajjar
  - Bahadurgarh Industrial estate
  - Kutana Industrial estate
  - Rohtak
  - Rohtak IMT*
- Sirsa
  - Sirsa Industrial estate
  - Tohana Industrial estate
- Sonepat
  - Kharkhoda IMT*
  - Barhi Industrial estate
  - Kundli Industrial estate
  - Murthal Industrial estate
  - Rai Industrial estate
  - Samalkha Industrial estate
  - Sonepat Industrial estate
- Yamunanagar
  - Manakpur IMT*
  - Yamunanagar Industrial estate

Marketing and business development office

- New Delhi

=== Integrated Multimodel Logistics Hubs (IMLH) ===
- Existing, being expanded or under-construction
  - Nangal Choudhary IMLH, existing near Delhi–Jaipur Expressway and Ambala–Narnaul Industrial Corridor with containerized road and rail facilities, to serve South Haryana, and North and East Rajasthan
    - Rewari–Bawal as spoke
  - Pinjore IMLH for the fruits, being developed at former HMT site on Ambala–Chandigarh Expressway with containerized road and rail facilities as well as air cargo from Chandigarh Airport and Pinjore Airport to be developed into cargo and domestic passenger airport, to serve Chandigah, North Haryana, Himachal Pradesh and Eastern Punjab
    - Bilaspur to be developed as spoke with railway sliding on the proposed Chandigarh–Yamunanagar rail line
  - Sonipat existing inland container depot and logistics park at Delhi–Chandigarh NH1, existing with road facilities, proposed to be expanded to IIMHL with air cargo from IGI Delhi
  - Kharkhoda Footwear IMLH, in Sonipat under implementation with containerized road and rail cargo. Maruti Suzuki new manufacturing facility in Kharkhoda
  - Manesar road cargo and railway sliding for Maruti Suzuki on Western Peripheral Expressway
- Along Western Peripheral Expressway
  - Farrukhnagar, proposed with road and rail facilities as well as air cargo from IGI Delhi will serve Delhi, East Haryana
  - Tapkan, proposed with road and with railway sliding on the proposed rail sliding facilities as well as air cargo from IGI Delhi and proposed Bhiwadi Cargo Airport, to create Bhiwadi-Taoru–Nuh agglomeration along DMIC and Delhi–Mumbai Expressway, will serve South NCR, South Haryana and Northeast Rajasthan
  - Hassanpur, proposed with road and rail cargo as well as air cargo from Jewar Airport, to create Palwal–Jewar agglomeration, will serve Southeast NCR, Southeast Haryana, East Rajasthan and South-Central UP
    - Ferozepur Jhirka, on Delhi–Mumbai Expressway with containerized road cargo and proposed Delhi–Sohna–Nuh–Alwar rail line, initially as spoke and eventually as Hub
- West Haryana
- Hisar IMLH, under implementation with road, rail and Hisar Aviation hub for the West Haryana and Eastern Rajasthan
    - Loharu as spoke
    - Fatehabad as spoke
    - Meham, initially as a spoke until it is developed as a separate hub
- Sirsa IMLH, proposed hub for North Rajasthan, Western Punjab and Northwest Haryana, Hisar Airport to be expanded in to Civilian and Cargo enclave specially for the citrus fruits
    - Dabwali as spoke
- Central Haryana
- Meham IMLH, proposed with road, rail and air cargo for Haryana, Punjab and Rajasthan, air cargo from Hisar Airport as well from the proposed Meham Cargo Airport
    - Charki Dadri as spoke with sliding on proposed Jhajjar–Charkhi Dadri–Jhumpa rail line,
- North Haryana
  - Narwana towards Kaithal on Delhi–Amritsar–Katra Expressway for the south-central Punjab, with existing road and rail links and the proposed Narwana Airport
    - Safidon as spoke
- East Haryana
  - Karnal, on NH1 with containerized road and rail cargo for textile, hosiery, and scientific equipment.
    - Pehowa as spoke

== Policies ==
HSIIDC is the nodal agency for both labour policy and land pooling policy of the state.

=== Labour Policy ===
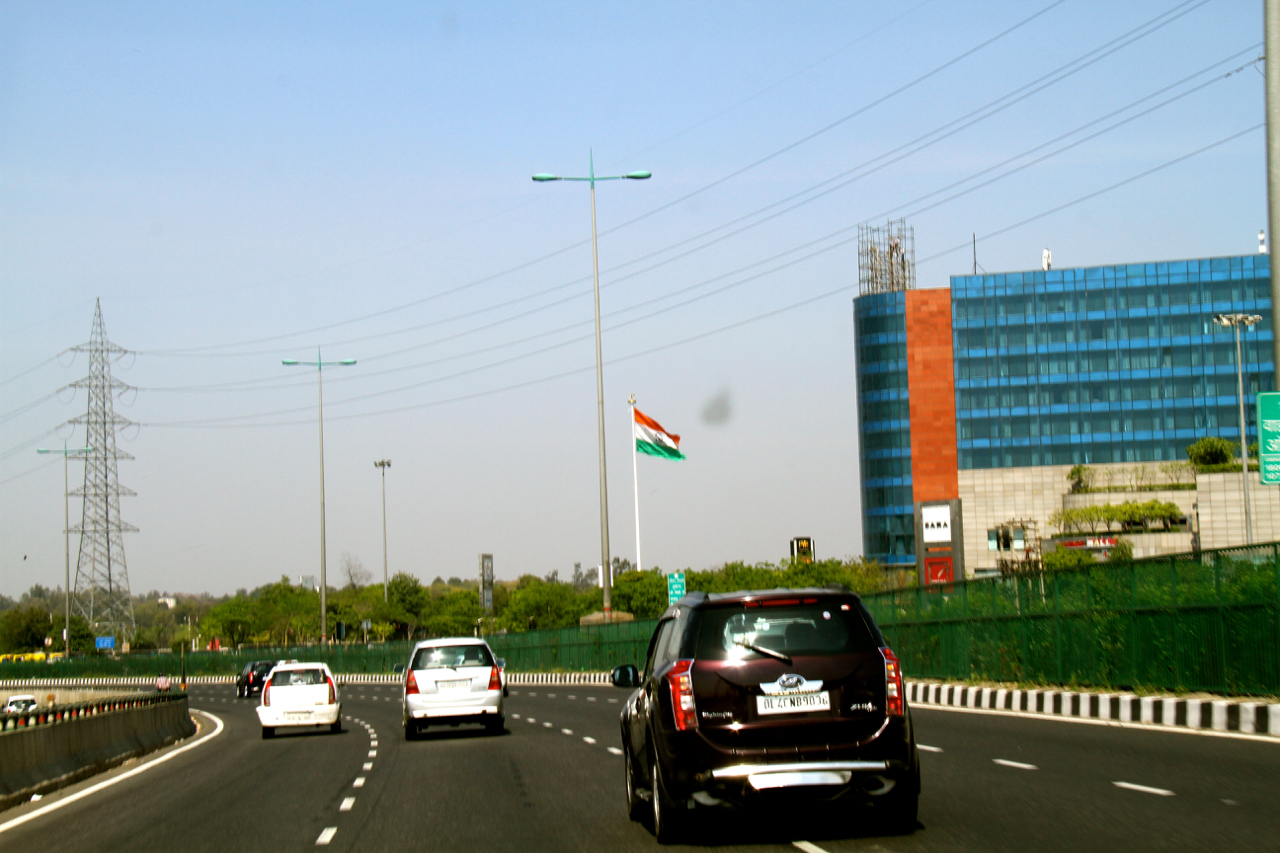
HSIIDC Industrial park on the way to IGI Airport.

Haryana Labour Policy (HLP) was introduced in 2005 to enhance the ease of doing business in the state.

=== Land Pooling Policy ===
Haryana Land Pooling Policy (HLPP), approved in January 2018, is used by the HSVP for acquiring land from the landlords for developing residential sectors. Landlords join the scheme voluntarily and at least 70% landowners must agree to pool their contiguous land, who receive INR50,000 per acre per year until the land is developed. After the land is developed, the landlords also will receive 33% of the developed residential plots in proportion to the land contributed by them to the pool, 33% will be sold by HSVP, 33% will be used for developing services such as roads and parks.

== Entrepreneur Center ==
Haryana Entrepreneur Center is a single-window service centre for providing 70 types of services of 17 departments under one roof.

== See also ==
- Haryana Shahari Vikas Pradhikaran
- Divisions of Haryana
