= D. Roopa =

Indian police officer

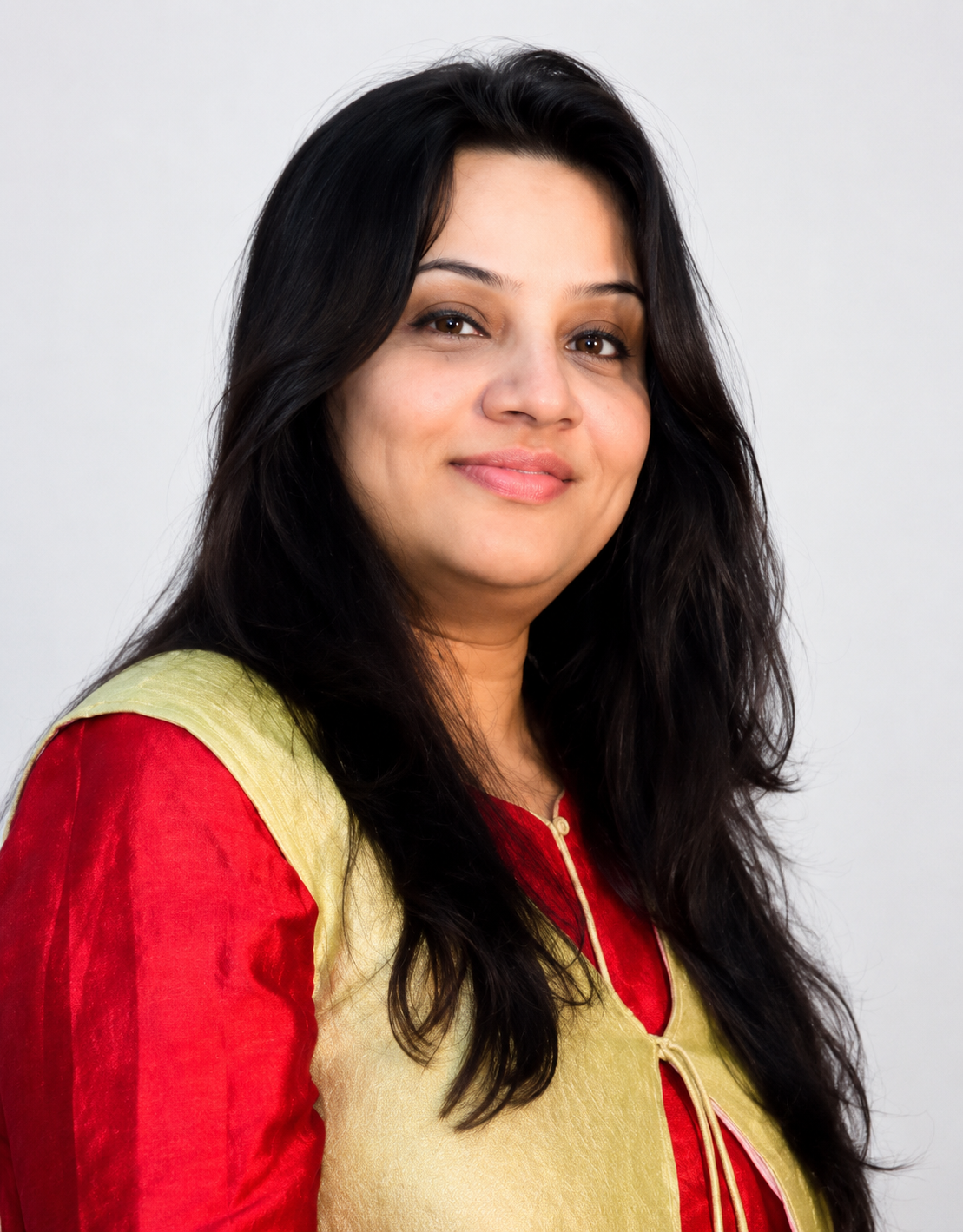
- Roopa in 2023

Inspector General of Police (Karnataka)

Personal details
- Born: Roopa Divakar; 12 July 1975 (age 51) Davanagere, Karnataka
- Spouse: Munish Moudgil (m. 2003)
- Education: M.A. (Psychology)
- Alma mater: Bangalore University

Roopa Divakar Moudgil is an Indian Police Service officer belonging to the cadre of Karnataka. She is from the 2000 officers' batch of the Indian Police Service and is the Inspector General of Police of the Karnataka State Police.

Roopa has also been posted as Additional Commandant General, Home Guards and ex-officio Additional Director, Civil Defense, commissioner for traffic and road safety, and Deputy Inspector General of Prisons in Karnataka.

Roopa faces a criminal defamation case relating to accusations she made about a fellow officer. The dispute led to the Prime Minister’s office reprimanding Chief Minister Basavaraj Bommai for his handling of the affair.

Roopa has worked with Israel to promote ties between the two countries.

== Early life and education ==
Roopa was born in Davanagere, Karnataka, to J. S. Divakar, an engineer, and Hemavathi. Her younger sister, Rohini Divakar, is a Joint Commissioner of Income Tax in the Indian Revenue Service.

Roopa was educated at St. Paul's Convent School and St. Joseph's High School in Davanagere. She then earned a B.Sc. from A.V. Kamalamma College for Women, Davanagere, and an M.A. in Psychology from the Bangalore University. She is a trained Bharatanatyam dancer.

In 2003, she married Munish Moudgil, an alumnus of the Indian Institute of Technology, Bombay, and an Indian Administrative Service officer. The couple have two children, Rushil and Anagha.

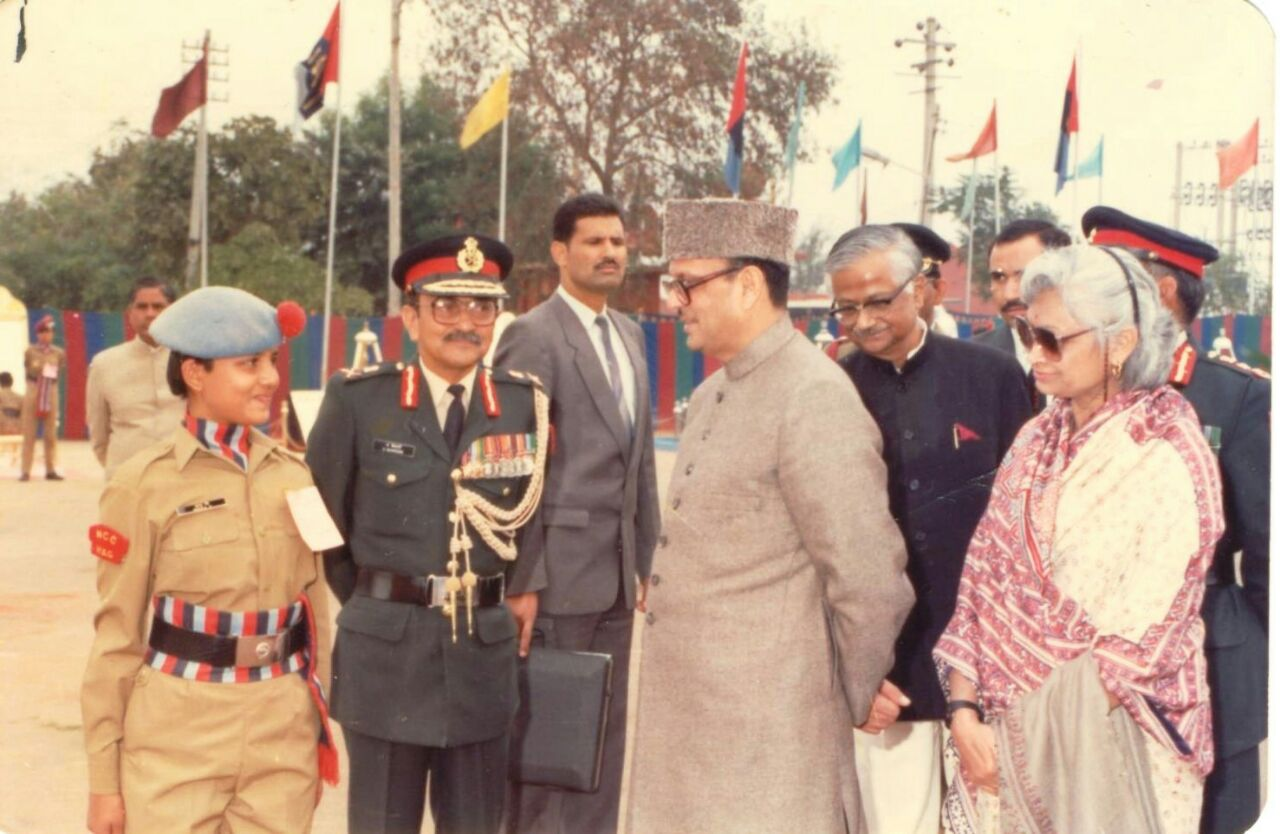
D Roopa, with the then Prime Minister, V. P. Singh and Minister for Science & Technology Sri Raja Ramanna; as Best National Cadet Corps (NCC) cadet, represented Karnataka in New Delhi while in class 9.

== Career ==
Roopa ranked 43rd out of 2,000 in the Union Public Service Commission examinations.

Soon after training, Roopa was posted as Superintendent of police in the Dharwad district. She also held the same post in the Gadag district and the Yadgir district before moving to Bengaluru.

In 2007, she arrested then-Madhya Pradesh Chief Minister and former Union Minister Uma Bharati. In 2008, she arrested Yavagal, an ex-minister, and suspended her subordinate, Deputy Superintendent Masooti for continuously contacting Yavagal.

She became the first female police officer to head the Cyber-Crime police division in 2013. While she was the DCP, City Armed Reserve in Bengaluru, she withdrew 216 unauthorised orderlies from 81 politicians. She also withdrew 8 new and unauthorized SUVs of the department that remained with the ex-Chief Minister of Karnataka.

In July 2017, Roopa was transferred from her post as Deputy Inspector General Prisons, a post she took shortly before becoming the commissioner for traffic and road safety. Days after she found irregularities inside the jail, she alleged that AIADMK (Amma) general secretary V K Sasikala was receiving VIP treatment at Parappana Agrahara Central Prison. In a report submitted to the Home Department and Director General of Police (DGP) for Prison Department H N Sathyanarayana Rao, in which Deputy Inspector General (Prisons) Roopa claimed that Sasikala was being provided with VIP treatment in jail: a whole corridor comprising five cells had been set aside for her private use, there was an exclusive kitchen to cook meals for her, and visiting hours were relaxed in exchange for a Rs 2-crore bribe to jail officials.

In January 2019, a high-level probe led by retired IAS officer Vinay Kumar, acting as an independent inquiry committee, looked into these allegations of irregularities and confirmed "serious lapses" and "falsification of records" on the part of senior prison officials in extending special treatment to V.K. Sasikala. A case was registered with Anti Corruption Bureau based on her report. The inquiry committee also found that prison officials were aware that the cells were provided to Sasikala for private use.

She was selected by the Israel Foreign Ministry to be part of their Hasbara effort to "discover Israel delegation" to promote ties between the two countries.

She had been transferred 41 times in 17 years until 2017 and has faced privilege motions for naming politicians in FIRs. She also faced a defamation case seeking Rs. 20 crore by DGP Satyanarayana, This case was quashed by the Karnataka High Court in June 2022.

A Karnataka court has directed the police to file a criminal defamation case against IPS officer D. Roopa Moudgil for allegedly posting objectionable pictures and videos of IAS officer Rohini Sindhuri and for accusing her of unethical practices.

== Awards ==
She was awarded the President's Police Medal for Meritorious Service in 2016.
