= Rajesh Khullar =

Diplomat and IAS officer, India

Rajesh Khullar IAS
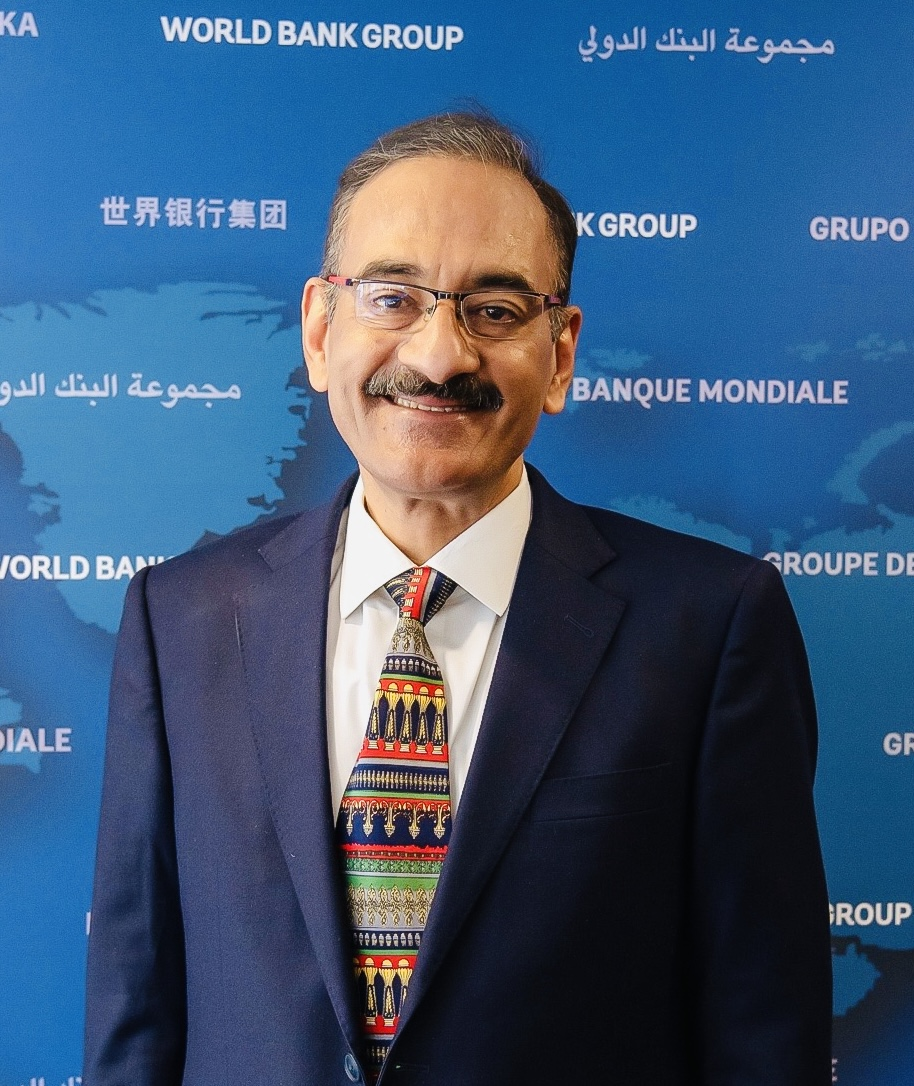

Chief Principal Secretary to Chief Minister, Haryana
- Incumbent
- Assumed office 1 September 2023
- Prime Minister: Narendra Modi
- Chief Minister: Manohar Lal Khattar, Nayab Singh Saini

Executive Director at World Bank Group
- In office 1 November 2020 – 31 March 2023
- President: David Malpass
- Deputy: Rajeev Topno

Principal Secretary to Chief Minister, Haryana
- In office 15 November 2015 – 30 October 2020
- Prime Minister: Narendra Modi
- Chief Minister: Manohar Lal Khattar

Joint Secretary at Department of Economic Affairs
- In office 9 February 2011 – 26 February 2015
- Prime Minister: Manmohan Singh, Narendra Modi
- Minister: Pranab Mukherjee, P Chidambaram, Arun Jaitley

Personal details
- Born: 31 August 1963 (age 62) Ambala, Haryana
- Education: Harvard Kennedy School, GRIPS, Panjab University
- Occupation: IAS Officer

Rajesh Khullar (born 31 August 1963) is a high-ranking Indian official and Chief Principal Secretary to Chief Minister, Haryana. Known as “Haryana’s Chanakya,” Khullar's quiet statecraft has long shaped the state’s political calculus, anchoring him at the centre of power. Previously, he served on the board of the World Bank Group as India, Bangladesh, Bhutan, and Sri Lanka's representative. Khullar belongs to the IAS, India's elite civil service, tasked with commanding policy, governance, and administration nationwide.

== Early life and education ==
Khullar was born on 31 August 1963 in Ambala Cantonment, India, where his father was detailed as an officer of the Indian Army. He earned his bachelor's degree from Kurukshetra University at the age of 17. He went on to receive a Master of Science (MSc) in Physics, graduating with a gold medal from Panjab University. Khullar was pursuing a Master of Technology (MTech) at Indian Institute of Technology (IIT) Delhi when he joined the Indian Police Service (IPS) in 1987, assigned to the Maharashtra cadre. While training at National Police Academy, Hyderabad, he joined the Indian Administrative Service (IAS) with Haryana cadre in 1988. Khullar also holds a Master of Public Administration degree from GRIPS, Tokyo, Japan and an Executive Development Program diploma from Harvard Kennedy School. He speaks Punjabi, Hindi, English and Japanese.

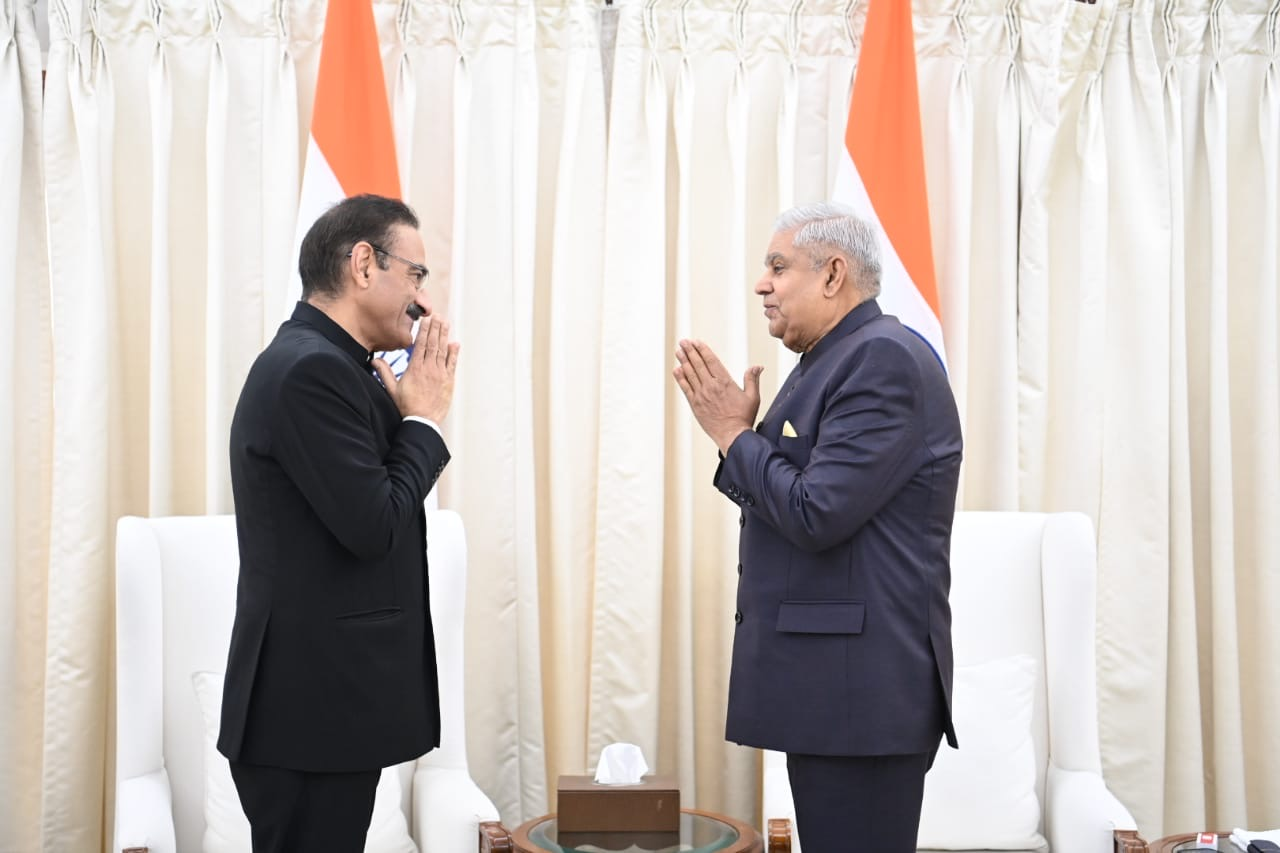
Khullar (left) with the 14th Vice President of India, Jagdeep Dhankhar (right) at the Vice President's Residence in New Delhi on 9 February 2024

== Career ==
As a career bureaucrat, Khullar has served in various capacities in both Government of India and Government of Haryana. These include Joint Secretary (Department of Economic Affairs, Ministry of Finance), Home Secretary (Haryana), Municipal Commissioner (Gurgaon and Faridabad) and District Magistrate (Sonipat and Rohtak) among others.

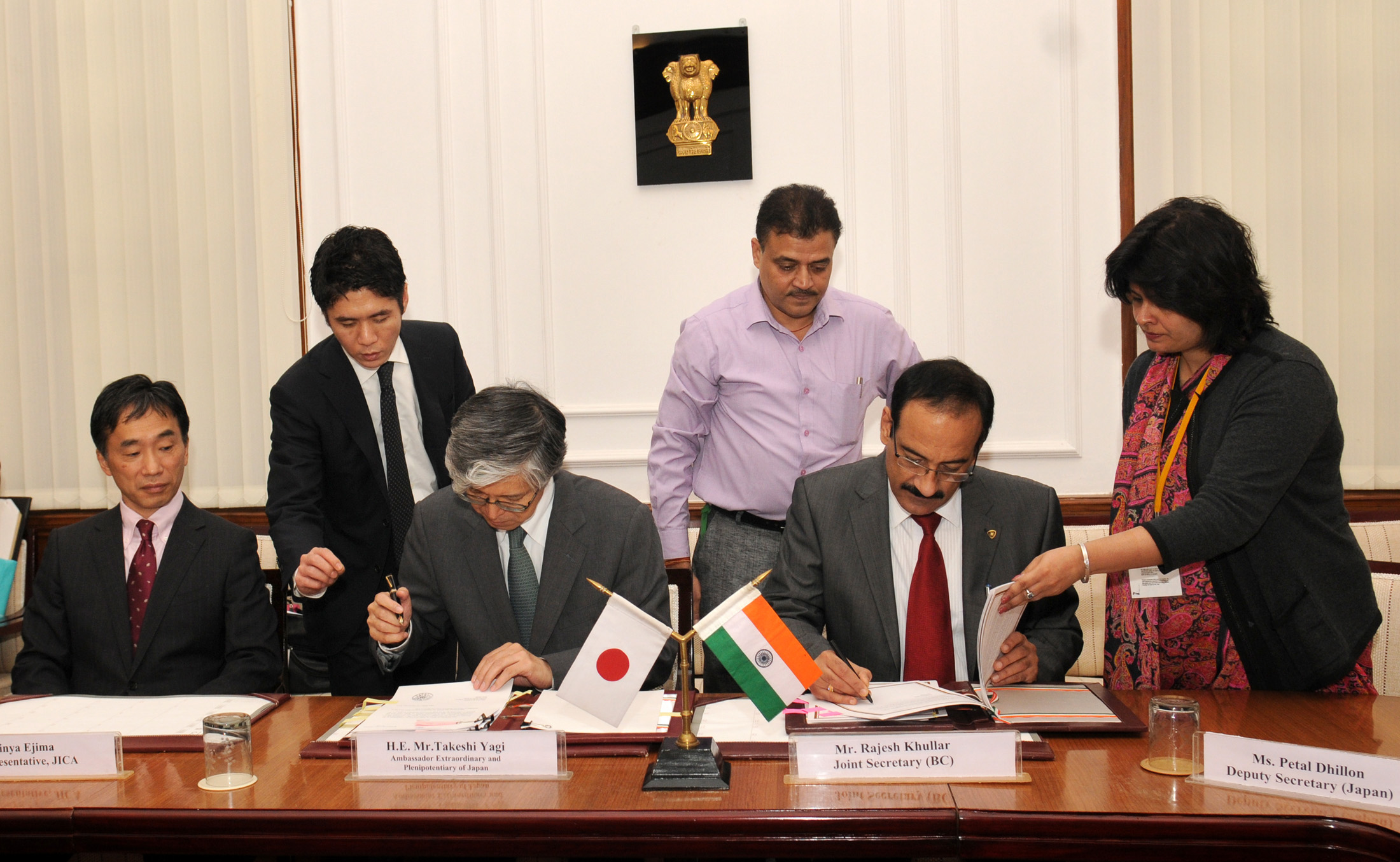
Khullar (right) with the Ambassador of Japan to India, Takeshi Yagi (left) on the signing of the Official Development Assistance agreement worth ¥30 billion in New Delhi on 12 November 2013

=== Joint Secretary, Ministry of Finance ===
In February 2011, Khullar was appointed Joint Secretary, Department of Economic Affairs, Ministry of Finance. He helped formulate India's Public Private Partnership and Land Monetization policies, developed the structure of India's infrastructure debt funds, and signed key bilateral agreements as Joint Secretary. Khullar demitted office in February 2015 following his repatriation to the state cadre at the request of the newly formed Bharatiya Janata Party (BJP) government in Haryana, the first of its kind in the state's history.

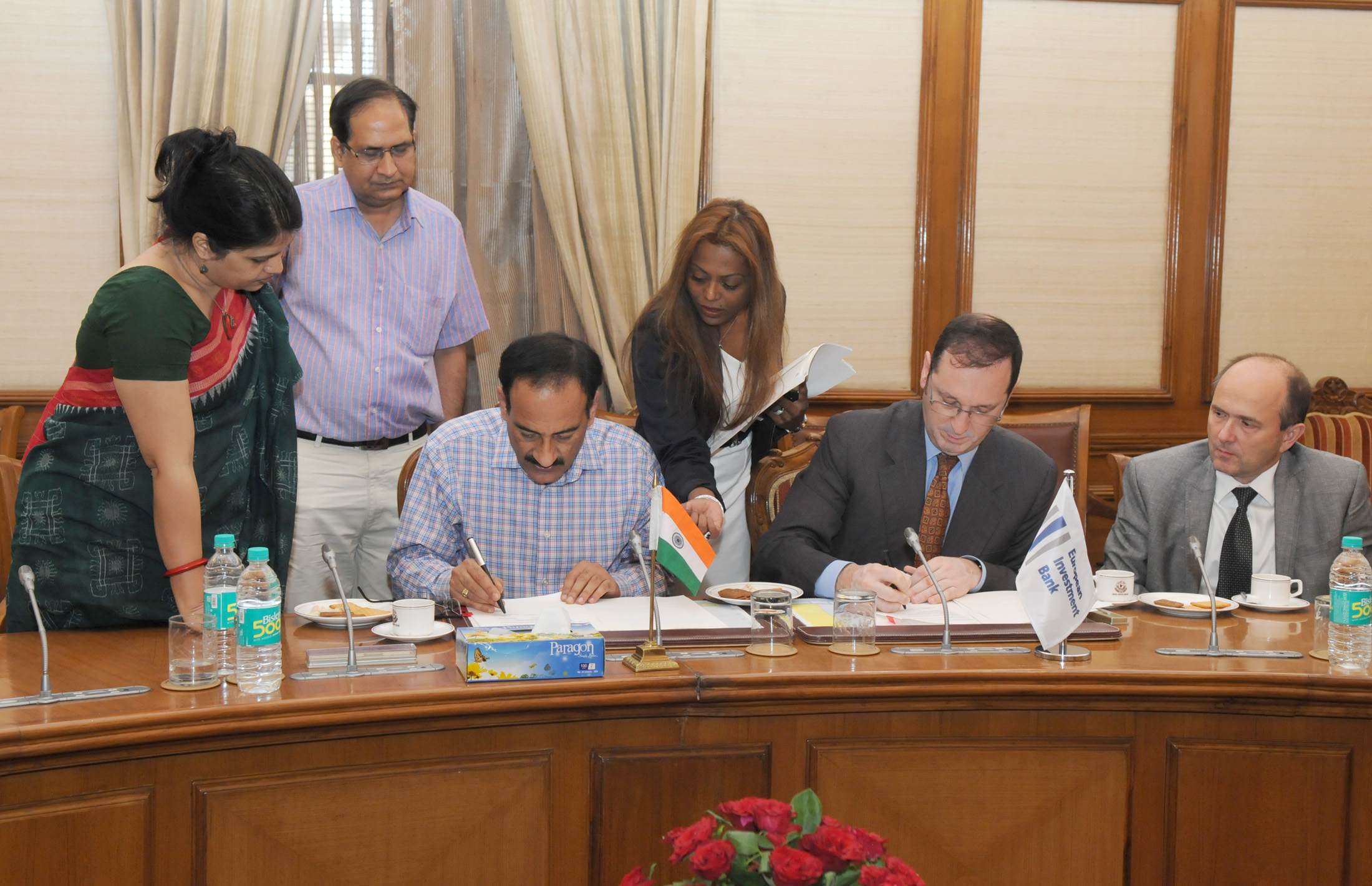
Khullar (left) with the Director for Asia and Latin America, Francisco de. Paula Coelho (right) on the signing of €200 million loan between European Investment Bank and the Department of Economic Affairs in New Delhi on 29 April 2014

=== Principal Secretary to Chief Minister, Haryana ===
In November 2015, Khullar was appointed Principal Secretary to Chief Minister, Haryana. He also served as the Chairman of Haryana State Industrial and Infrastructure Development Corporation (HSIIDC) and Haryana Financial Corporation. In Haryana, Khullar inspired farmers to conserve water, promoted the use of digital governance tools, and designed schemes to curb female foeticide. He demitted office in October 2020 upon his appointment as Executive Director at the World Bank Group by the Appointments Committee of the Cabinet (ACC), chaired by the Prime Minister of India.

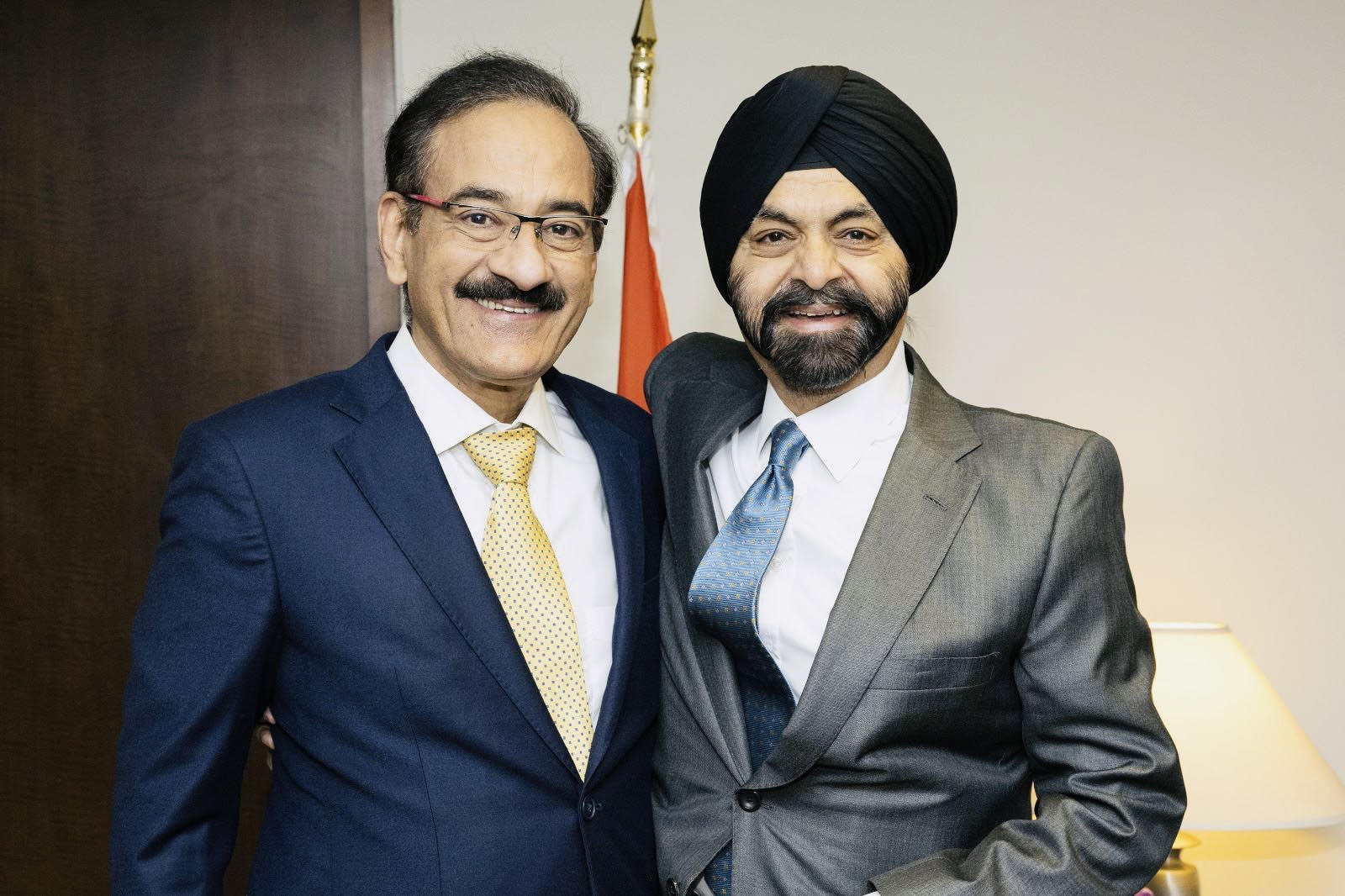
Khullar (left) with the 14th World Bank Group President and former Vice Chairman at General Atlantic, Ajay Banga (right) at the World Bank Group headquarters in Washington, D.C., on 1 March 2023

=== Executive Director, World Bank Group ===
In September 2020, Khullar was appointed Executive Director at the World Bank Group. He chaired the World Bank Group's Committee on Development Effectiveness (CODE) and was a member of the Global Environment Facility council, where he represented Nepal and Maldives in addition to India, Bangladesh, Bhutan and Sri Lanka. As Executive Director, Khullar instituted a new policy for the Compliance Advisor Ombudsman to strengthen environmental and social accountability for the International Finance Corporation and Multilateral Investment Guarantee Agency. He also led a group of 29 countries to pledge $5.3 billion for the Global Environmental Facility to tackle climate change and biodiversity loss. He was recalled to India in March 2023, six months before the end of his term, in preparation for the parliamentary and state elections in 2024. BJP won both elections that year.

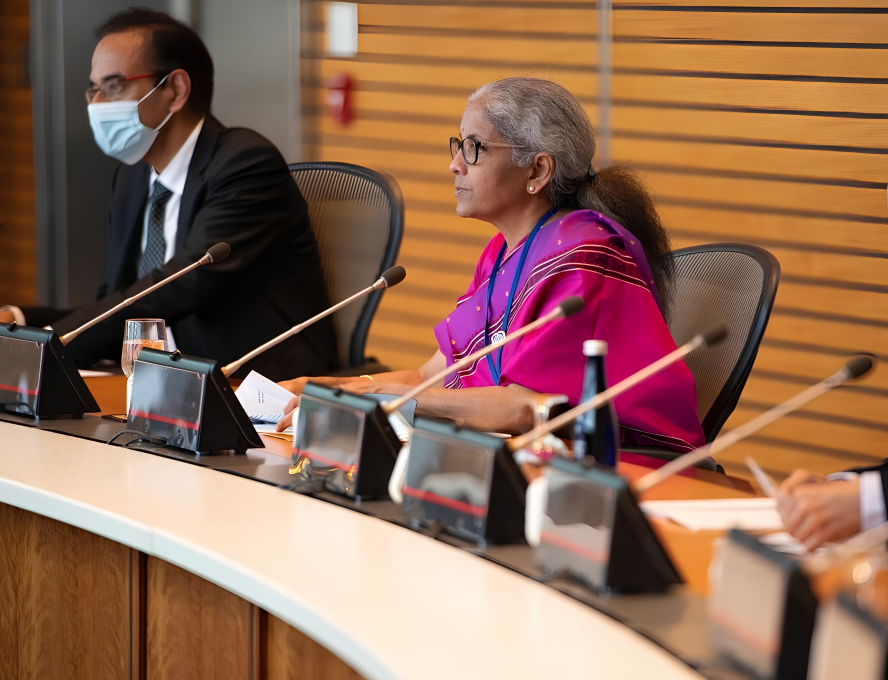
Khullar (left) with the 30th Finance Minister of India, Nirmala Sitharaman (right) at the International Monetary Fund headquarters in Washington, D.C., on 20 April 2022

=== Chief Principal Secretary to Chief Minister, Haryana ===
Due to superannuate from the IAS on 31 August 2023, Khullar was appointed Chief Principal Secretary to Chief Minister, Haryana the following day, a position specially created for him. When Manohar Lal Khattar was replaced by Nayab Singh Saini in March 2024, Khullar continued in the role, with commentators describing him as the de facto head of the state. Such was his political influence that during the 2024 Indian general election campaign, the Rahul Gandhi-led Indian National Congress petitioned the Election Commission of India to have him reassigned, a request the Commission did not act upon. Following BJP's victory in 2024, Khullar was reappointed Chief Principal Secretary in the new government, with 21 departments placed under him, including Finance, Home, Energy, Revenue, and Industries and Commerce, along with overall charge of the Chief Minister's office and of legislative business before the Council of Ministers. He is widely regarded as the true seat of power in Haryana.

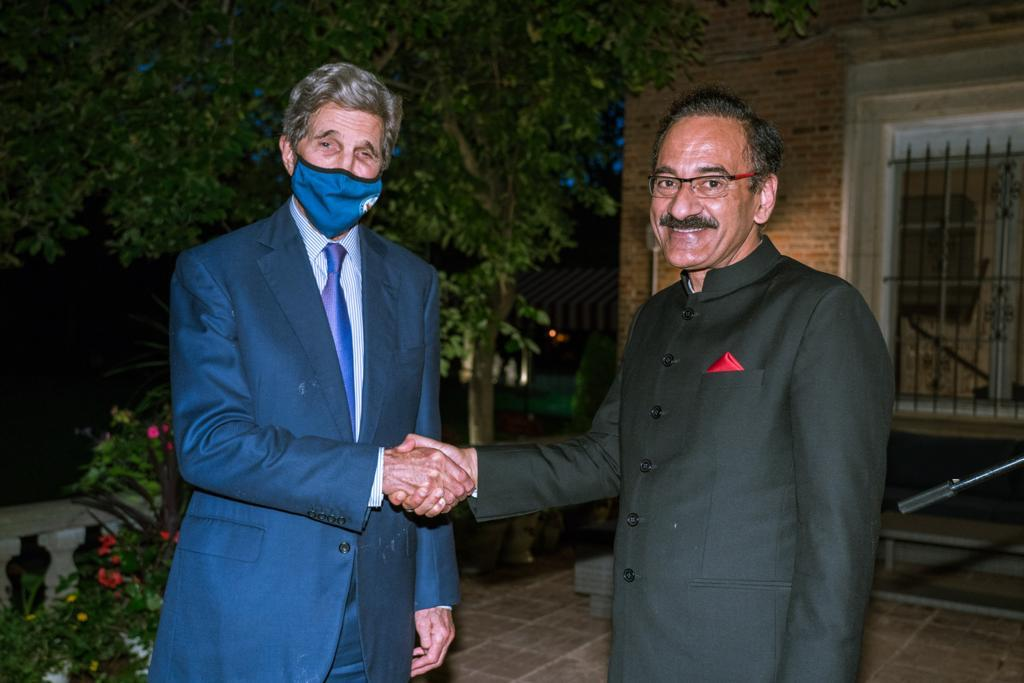
Khullar (right) with the former U.S. Special Presidential Envoy for Climate and United States Secretary of State, John Kerry (left) at India House, Washington, D.C., on 14 October 2021

== Recognition ==
In 2009, Khullar was conferred an Award of Excellence under Jawaharlal Nehru National Urban Renewal Mission (JNNURM) for creating India's first social safety umbrella which included savings accounts, insurance, public conveniences and night shelters.

In 2011, Khullar was recognized for developing Aravali Biodiversity Park, Gurgaon, which was declared India's first OECM (Other Effective Conservation Measures) site in February 2022.

In 2019, Khullar was named in Asia Post's list of top officers in India along with Ajay Kumar Bhalla, former Home Secretary (India) and Ajay Kumar, former Defence Secretary (India) who "have created new benchmarks of performance in public service."

== Works ==
- Viral Match (2008) ISBN 9788129112835
- Civil Services General Studies Main Examination - A Strategic Approach (2004) ISBN 8190214802
