= Rudraksha Pally =

Village in India

Rudraksha Pally is a village in India, in Sathupalli MD, Khammam District.
