= Rajeev Topno =

Indian Administrative Service officer

Rajeev Topno, IAS
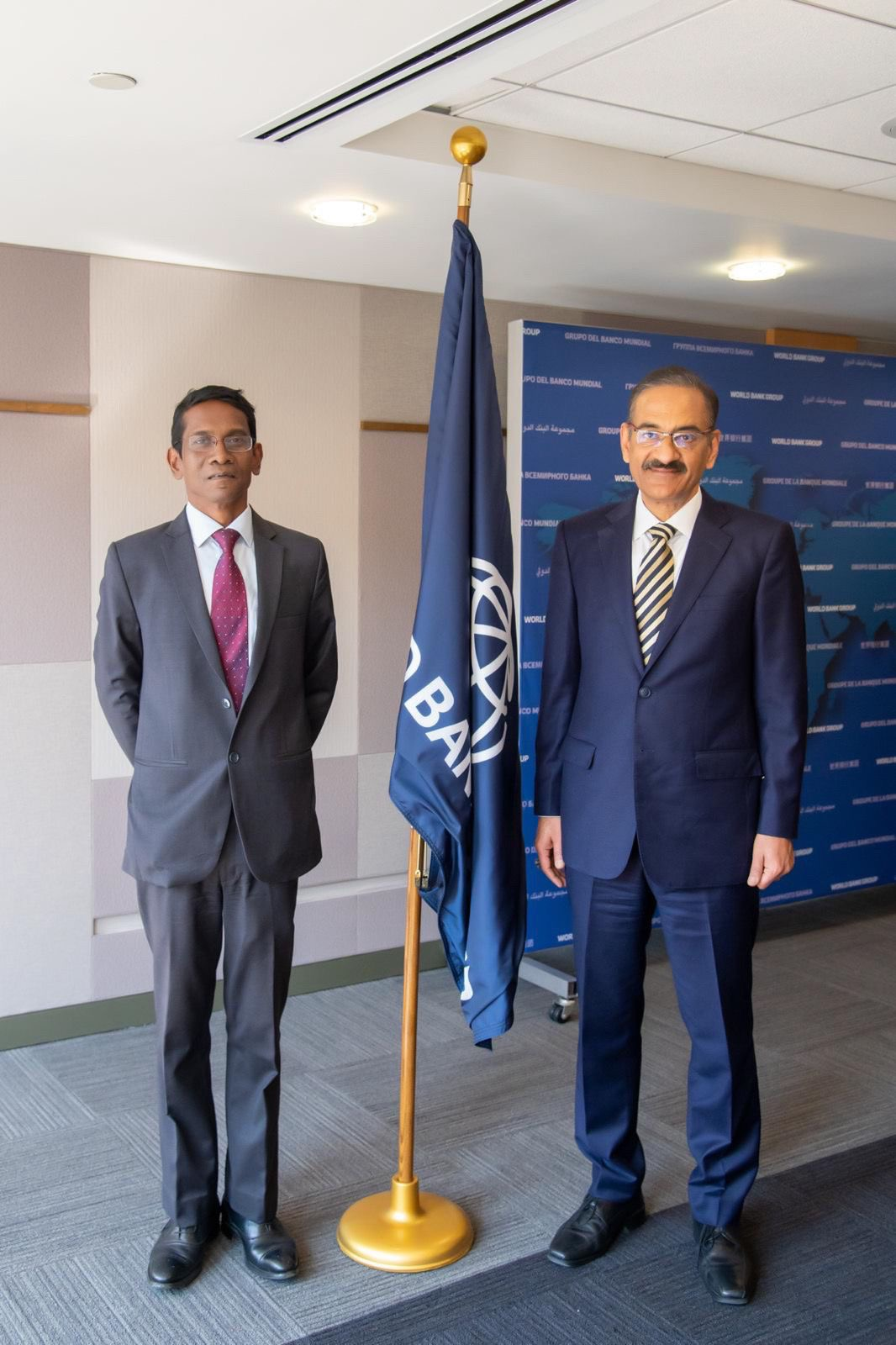
- Topno with Rajesh Khullar at The World Bank in Washington, D.C.

Senior Advisor to Executive Director of World Bank Group
- In office 1 August 2020 – 4 July 2024
- Executive Director: Rajesh Khullar
- Preceded by: Neeraj Mittal
- Succeeded by: Nikunj Kumar Srivastava

Private Secretary to Prime Minister of India
- In office 14 June 2014 – 4 June 2020
- Prime Minister: Narendra Modi
- Succeeded by: Hardik Shah

Personal details
- Born: 28 May 1974 (age 52) Ranchi, Jharkhand
- Education: (BA) St. Xavier's College, Kolkata; University of Calcutta
- Occupation: IAS Officer, Civil Servant

Rajeev Topno (born 28 May 1974 in Ranchi, Jharkhand) is an Indian Administrative Service officer of 1996 batch from Gujarat cadre who previously served as Senior Advisor to the Executive Director of the World Bank Group. Prior to that, he was Private Secretary to the Prime Minister of India, Narendra Modi.

== Education and early life ==
Rajeev Topno did his schooling from St. Thomas' Boys School, Khiderpore. He received Bachelor of Arts degree in political science and sociology from St. Xavier's College, Kolkata and joined Gujarat cadre in 1998 as assistant collector at Bharuch. He served state government in different capacities at district and state level till 2009. Following that, he was on central government deputation posted as the deputy secretary at Prime Minister's Office, Delhi from 2009 to 2014. In June 2014, he was appointed as the private secretary of the Prime Minister of India, Narendra Modi.
