= Rai, Sonipat =

Rai
- village
- Location in Haryana, India Rai (India)
- Coordinates: 28.9283328°N 77.1033463°E
- Country: India
- State: Haryana
- District: Sonepat district
- Elevation: 237 m (778 ft)

Population (2011)
  - Total: 923

Languages
  - Official: Hindi
  - Additional official: English, Punjabi
- Time zone: UTC+5:30 (IST)
- Postal code: 131029
- Telephone code: +91-0131-XXXXXX
- Vehicle registration: HR-10
- Sex Ratio: 904:1000 ♂/♀
- Website: haryana.gov.in

Rai is a village and development block in Sonepat tehsil of Sonepat district in Haryana state of India. It is located just 1 km from Sonepat.

== Demography ==
It has a population 5,278 people in 1,119 households, as per 2011 census of India.

== Rai industrial estate ==
Rai is in the influence zone of Amritsar Delhi Kolkata Industrial Corridor and Eastern Dedicated Freight Corridor in NCR region. HSIIDC has established an industrial estate to boost the economic growth. In 2012, the estate has 800 with an annual turnover of around INR 12000 crore (120 billion).

== Education ==
Motilal Nehru School of Sports, Rai is located at Rai.

== See also ==
- List of HSIIDC Industrial Estates
