= Sathupalli =

- town
- Location in Telangana, India Sathupalli (India)
- Coordinates: 17°12′30″N 80°50′10″E
- Country: India
- State: Telangana
- District: Khammam
- Mandal: Sathupalli
- Revenue division: Kalluru

Government
  - Body: Municipality

Area
  - Total: 19.13 km^{2} (7.39 sq mi)

Population (2021/22)
  - Total: 98,615
  - Density: 5,155/km^{2} (13,350/sq mi)

Languages
  - Official: Telugu
- Time zone: UTC+5:30 (IST)
- PIN: 507303
- Telephone code: 08761
- Vehicle registration: TG-04
- Lok Sabha constituency: Khammam
- Vidhan Sabha constituency: Sathupalli
- Website: https://satupallymunicipality.telangana.gov.in/062/home-page

Sathupalli (also spelled as Sathupally, Sathupalle) is a town in Khammam district of the Indian state of Telangana. It is a Municipality in Sathupalli mandal of Kalluru revenue division. It is situated approximately 276 km (171 mi) east of Hyderabad, 80 km (50 mi) from Khammam and 200 km (120 mi) from Warangal. It is about 135 km (84 mi) north of Amaravati, the state capital of Andhra Pradesh, and 126 km (78 mi) west of Rajahmundry. The Sathupalli is famous for its coal mines. The town consists of multiple blocks in Singareni collieries. There is nearly 40 km of railway track connecting to bhadrachalm road which is operated by SCR to transport particularly coal to the KTPS . Late Chief minister Jalagam Vengal Rao is from Sathupalli.

== Geography ==
Sathupalli is located at 17.21°N 80.82°E on the Global Positioning System.

== Demographics ==
Religions in Sathupalli
Religion	Percent
Hindu	85.20%
Muslim	13.32%
Christians	1.16%
Others†	0.14%
†Includes Sikhs, Jains

As of 2011 census of India, Sathupalli Nagar panchayat had a population of 98,615 of which 48,841 were male and 49,774 female with a sex ratio of 1019 against state average of 993. Child population (0–6 years) stands 9783 which is 9.92% of total population with a sex ratio of 1033 compared to 933 of state. Literacy rate stands at 82.37.

== Governance ==
The present member of legislative assembly elected in 2023 general assembly elections Smt. Matta Ragamai Dayanand from Indian National Congress party. Other political parties include the Bharat Rashtra Samithi, the Indian National Congress, the Bharatiya Janata Party, the CPI, and the CPI(M). The Telangana Christian Party (TCP), Hindu Praja Shakti Party (HPSP) and Jana Sena Party offices are located in Sathupalli.

== Economy ==
- Singareni Collieries Company

Jalagam Vengalarao (JVR) Opencast coal mine is situated in the Godavari Valley coal belt of Sathupalli- Chintalapudi, West Godavari district. The 10 MTPA coal mine stretches over an area of 1956,89 ha. It is located in Ayyagaripeta & Komapalli villages, Mandal Sathupalli, Khammam district, Telangana state, India.

JVR coal mines consist of two adjacent mines JVR OC-I and JVR OC-II. JVR OC-I started production as a Sathupalli opencast mine at a capacity of 0.7 MTPA in 2005 and was granted environmental clearance on 16 September 2004. On 27 July 2007, Sathupalli coal mine obtained additional environmental clearance for a 2.5 MTPA rise in output and was renamed JVR OC-I.The JVR OC-I expansion project of capacity of 5.0 MTPA was started on 23 February 2015 and coal production was started on 31 March 2015. JVR OC-I has produced 100+ Crore revenue so far(2020).

On 28 March 2010, JVR OC-II received its environmental clearance for a maximum capacity of 5 MTPA over a lease area of 1409.81 ha.

JVR Opencast Project-II, The proposed project is designed for an annual rated capacity of 10 MTPA on a 1910.09 ha area. The project's balance of extractable reserves is 245,51 Mt, with a projected life of 28 years. It is also intended to set up a 4 MTPA coal washer in 13.03 ha of land within the project area in order to wash the coal having an average G12 grade to acquire G9 grade coal.

=== Industries ===
- Mega Food Parks

Sathupalli mandal, the district's agricultural and horticultural centre, is expected to soon become a major food processing centre in the state with the formal start of work on the long-awaited Buggapadu mega-food park. Ministry of Food Processing Industries (MoFPI), Government of India has sanctioned Mega Food Parks in Sathupalli, Telangana State.

Industries Minister K. T. Rama Rao laid the foundation stone for the formally kick-starting works of the Rs 110-crore project on the Central Processing Center (CPC) and other infrastructure facilities on around 60 acres in Buggapadu near Sathupalli.

The project has been initiated by Telangana State Industrial Infrastructure Corporation (TSIIC) under the Union Ministry of Food Processing Industries' Mega Food Parks scheme.

The project aims at facilitating the establishment of a cluster of food processing units, building an efficient supply chain from farm to market, growing farmers ' incomes, and focusing on the district 's enormous growth potential for food processing industry. The CPC will be designed on the Industrial Park Model lines that encompass sewage and wastewater treatment plants, roads, power lines and other infrastructure facilities needed to allow prospective entrepreneurs to set up food processing units under the project.

Core processing infrastructure components such as warehouse, deep freeze, cold storage, aseptic packaging line and other facilities will be provided on a "user fee" basis.

== Transport ==
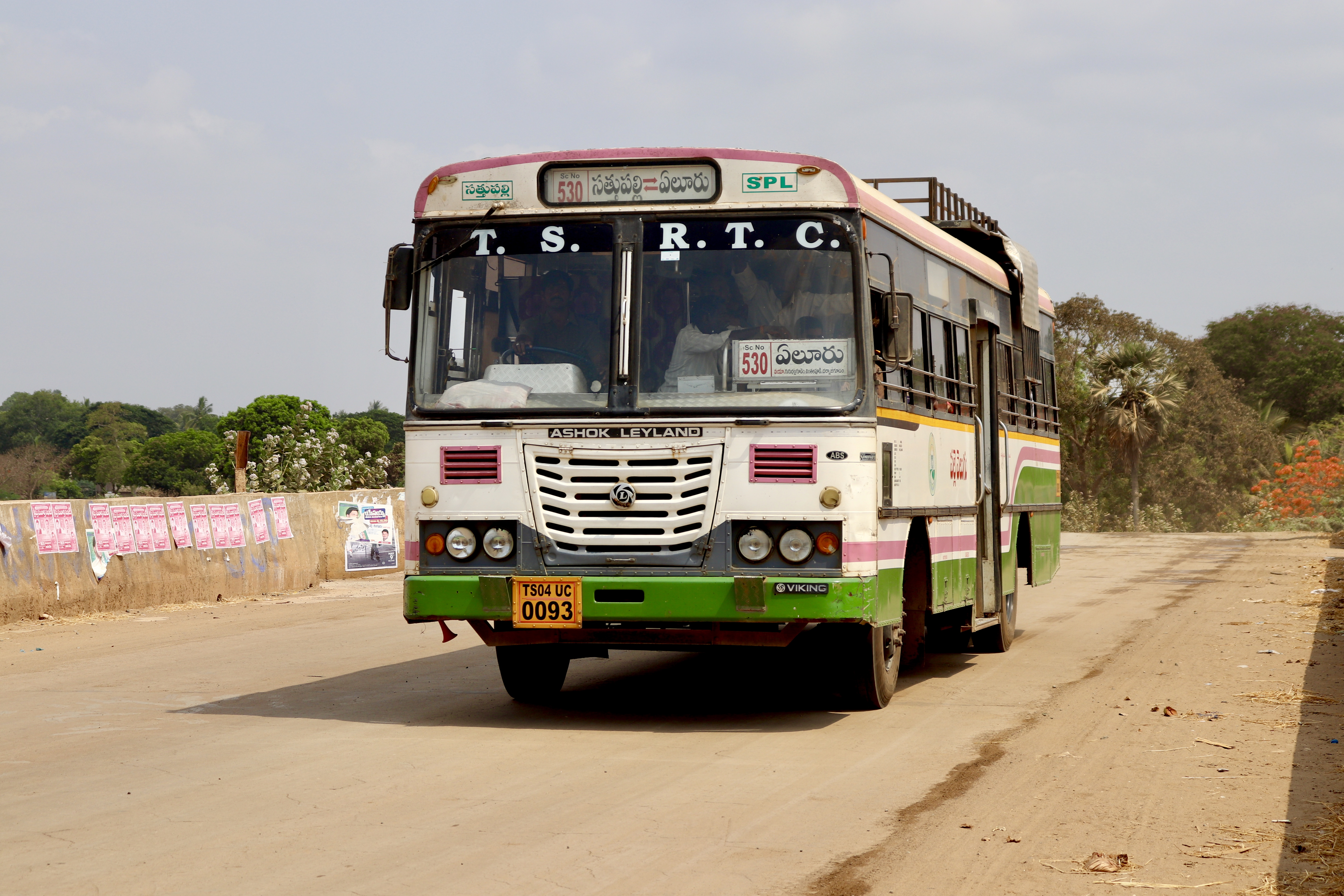
Sattupalli bus en route to Eluru

As Sathupalli is located on National Highway 365BB (India), it is well connected to major cities and towns in Telangana and Andhra Pradesh. Telangana State Road Transport Corporation (TSRTC) Sathupalli Depot operates regular bus services to cities like Hyderabad, Khammam, Suryapet, Vijayawada, Rajamundry, Eluru, Karimnagar, Badhrachalam, Kandukuru.

== Education ==
Krishi Public School is a private educational institute, primary and secondary school in Sathupalli.

== Notable people ==
- Ananya Nagalla, film actress
- Hanu Raghavapudi, film director and screenwriter
- Jalagam Vengala Rao, former chief minister of united Andhra Pradesh
- Thummala Nageswara Rao, Bharat Rashtra Samithi (BRS) politician
- Rohini Sindhuri, civil servant
