= Sathupalli mandal =

- Mandal
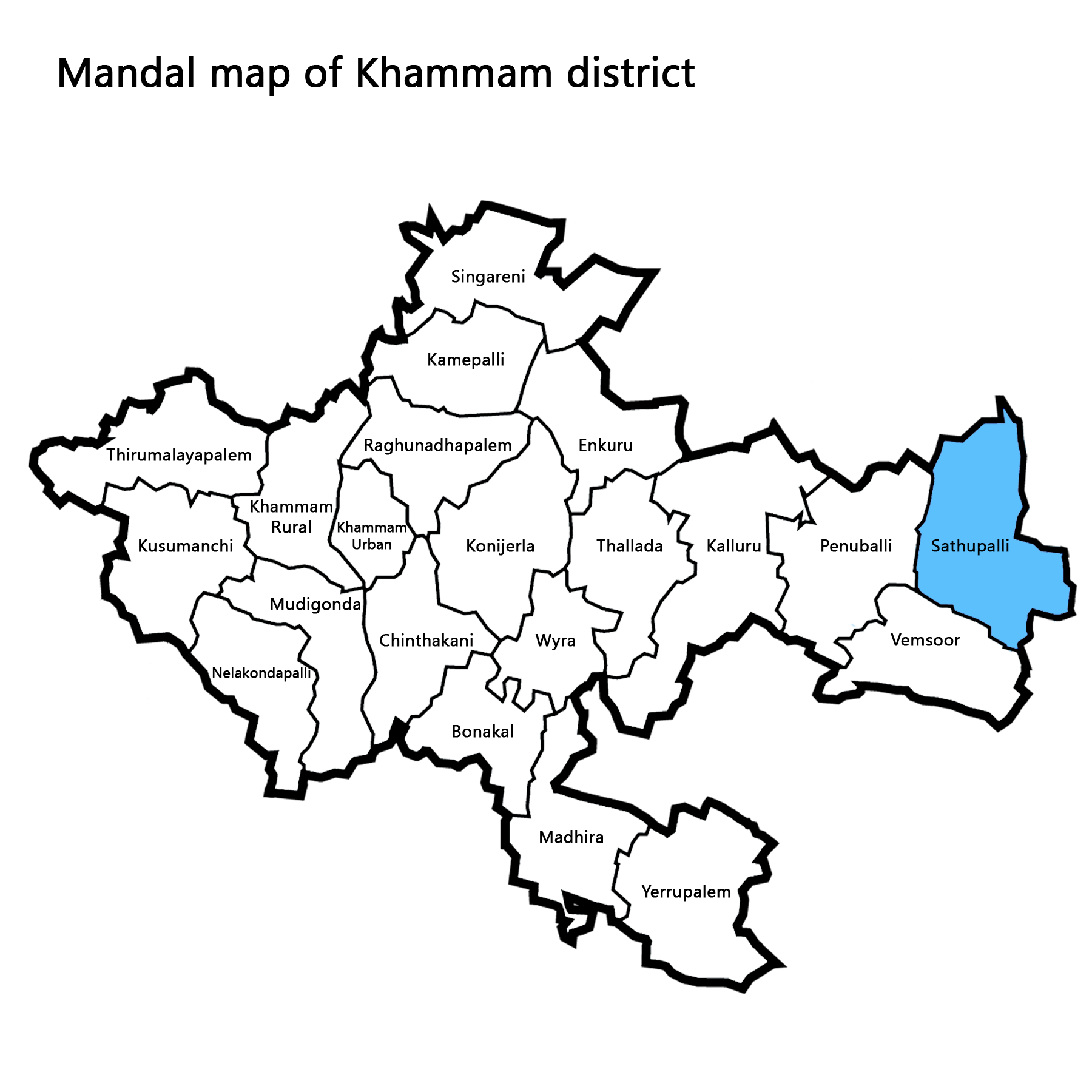
- Sathupalli mandal highlighted in blue

- Location in Telangana, India Sathupalli mandal (India)
- Coordinates: 17°12′30″N 80°50′10″E
- Country: India
- State: Telangana
- District: Khammam

Government
  - Body: Municipality

Population (2011)
  - Total: 77,043

Languages
  - Official: Telugu
- Time zone: UTC+5:30 (IST)
- Vehicle registration: TS-04

Sathupalli mandal is an administrative division located in the Khammam district of the Indian state of Telangana. It is situated in the Kalluru revenue division. Sathupalli town serves as the headquarters of this mandal.

== Demographics ==
Sathupalli mandal has a total population of 77,043, with 38,394 males and 38,649 females. The child population in the Mandal is 7,646, with an almost equal distribution between males (3,843) and females (3,803). There are 14,465 individuals belonging to Scheduled Castes and 12,344 individuals belonging to Scheduled Tribes. The sex ratio in Sathupalli mandal is approximately 993 males per 1,000 females.

Out of the total population, 49,704 individuals are literate, with 26,693 males and 23,011 females with a literacy rate of approximately 64.5%. On the other hand, there are 27,339 individuals who are illiterate, including 11,701 males and 15,638 females

The mandal has a workforce of 35,554 individuals, with 22,524 males and 13,030 females engaged in various occupations. The non-working population in Sathupalli mandal is 41,489, comprising 15,870 males and 25,619 females.

== Villages ==
List of villages in Sathupalli mandal and their population according to 2011 Census.

#	Villages	Population
1	Ayyagaripeta	-
2	Bethupalle	14,149
3	Cherukupalle	948
4	Jagannadhapuram	295
5	Dacharam	-
6	Kakarlapalle	4,165
7	Kistaram	3,666
8	Kommepalle	354
9	Regallapadu	554
10	Rejerla	4,388
11	Rudrakshapalle	5,531
12	Sadasivunipalem	1,610
13	Sathupalli	31,857
14	Siddaram	3,924
15	Thumbur	4,634
16	Yatalakunta	968
