= Mega Food Parks =

Indian government plan

Mega Food Park is a scheme of the Ministry of Food Processing (part of the Government of India) with the aim of establishing a "direct linkage from farm to processing and then to consumer markets" through a network of collection centres and primary processing centres. Its purpose was to increase processing of perishables from 6% to 20% and to increase India's share in global food trade by at least 3% up to year 2015.

According to an estimate, the Indian food industry was to grow from $200 million USD to $310 million USD in 2015 by this plan.

== Highlights of scheme ==
- Government provides grants up to Rs 50 crores for each food park to a consortium of companies.
- 30-35 food processing units are expected to be established.
- Collective investment of companies is expected to be at least 250 crores.
- A turnover of 400-500 crore and employment generation of at least 30000 from each mega food park is expected.

A total of 42 Mega Food Parks have been sanctioned so far by MoFPI in six phases. These MFPs are to ensure backward linkages to the farmers, SHGs, JLVs etc. & enhance farmer income. Each MFP is supposed to connect with 25000 farmers. Government has envisaged building quality labs at each of the food parks as well

== Status ==
A sanction of 42 food parks has been planned, out of which 25 in various states have already been sanctioned with 17 pending, expression of interest is available from companies with the government. According to the Government, as of October 2016, 8 mega food parks have become operational and all 42 would be operational in the next 2 years.

Park	City	State	Status
Bihar Industrial Area Development Authority (BIADA)	Muzaffarpur	Bihar	Partly Operational
Srini Mega Food Park	Chittoor	Andhra Pradesh	Operational
Godavari Mega Aqua Park	Bhimavaram	Andhra Pradesh	Operational
Andhra Pradesh Industrial Infrastructure Corporation Mega Food Park	Mallavalli	Andhra Pradesh	Under Implementation
Rongoge Mega Food Park	Naharlagun	Arunachal Pradesh	Under Implementation
North East Mega Food Park	Nalbari	Assam	Operational
Pristine Mega Food Park	Mansi	Bihar	Under Implementation
Indus Best Mega Food Park	Raipur	Chhattisgarh	Operational
Fanidhar Mega Food Park	Mehsana	Gujarat	Under Implementation
Gujarat Agro Mega Food Park	Surat	Gujarat	Operational
Hafed Mega Food Park	Rohtak	Haryana	Under Implementation
HSIIDC Mega Food Park	Sonipat	Haryana	Under Implementation
Cremica Mega Food Park	Una	Himachal Pradesh	Operational
RFK Greens Food Park	Pulwama	Jammu and Kashmir	Under Implementation
Integrated Mega Food Park	Tumkur	Karnataka	Operational
Favorich Infra Pvt Ltd Mega Food Park	Mandya	Karnataka	Under Implementation
KSIDC Mega Food Park	Alappuzha	Kerala	Under Implementation
KINFRA Mega Food Park	Palakkad	Kerala	Operational
Indus Mega Food Park	Khargone	Madhya Pradesh	Operational
Avantee Mega Food Park	Dewas	Madhya Pradesh	Operational
Paithan Mega Food Park	Aurangabad	Maharashtra	Operational
Satara Mega Food Park	Satara	Maharashtra	Operational
Wardha Mega Food Park	Wardha	Maharashtra	Under Implementation
Manipur Food Industries Corporation Limited Mega Food Park	Kakching	Manipur	Under Implementation
Zoram Mega Food Park	Khamrang	Mizoram	Under Implementation
Doys Agri Resources Private Limited' Mega Food Park	Dimapur	Nagaland	Under Implementation
MITS Mega Food Park	Khurda	Odisha	Under Implementation
Deras Seafood Park	Khurda	Odisha	Under Implementation
International Mega Food Park	Fazilka	Punjab	Operational
MITS Mega Food Park	Rayagada	Odisha	Operational
Punjab Agro Industries Corporation Limited Mega Food Park	Ludhiana	Punjab	Under Implementation
Sukhjit Mega Food Park	Kapurthala	Punjab	Under Implementation
Greentech Mega Food Park	Ajmer	Rajasthan	Operational
Smart Agro Mega Food Park	Nizamabad	Telangana	Operational
TSFPS Mega Food Park	Khammam	Telangana	Operational
Tripura Mega Food Park	Uttar Champamura	Tripura	Operational
Patanjali Food and Herbal Park	Haridwar	Uttarakhand	Operational
Himalayan Mega Food Park	Udham Singh Nagar	Uttarakhand	Operational
Jangipur Bengal Mega Food Park	Murshidabad	West Bengal	Operational
