= Lanka Sagar Dam =

- Location within Andhra Pradesh
- Location: Khammam district, Andhra Pradesh, India
- Coordinates: 17.172775°N 80.721359°E
- Purpose: Irrigation, municipal water
- Construction began: 10 December 1964
- Opening date: 1968

Dam and spillways
- Height (foundation): 13 m (43 ft)
- Length: 2,718 m (8,917 ft)

Reservoir
- Creates: Lanka Sagar Reservoir
- Total capacity: 18,842,000 m^{3} (15,275 acre⋅ft)
- Active capacity: 17,290,000 m^{3} (14,017 acre⋅ft)
- Catchment area: 20.72 km^{2} (8 mi^{2})

Lanka Sagar is a water project centered on an earth-fill dam on the Kuttalair River (Krishna Godavari Basin) near Adivimallala village in Andhra Pradesh, India. The villages of Rajugudem, Chowdavaram, Pallewada, Lankasagar are located around this project. It was built in 1968. The purpose of the dam is water supply for irrigation and drinking water. The project affords the irrigation of 7,353 acres (2,976 ha).

== Specifications ==
The height of the dam above lowest foundation is 13 m (43 ft) while the length is 2,718 m (8,917 ft). The gross storage capacity of the dam is 18,842,000 m^{3} (15,275 acre⋅ft) and its spillway is controlled by 48 floodgates.

== See also ==
- List of reservoirs and dams in India
