= Kandukuru, Khammam district =

Kandukuru
- town
- Location in Telangana, India Kandukuru (India)
- Coordinates: 17.076°N 80.830°E
- Country: India
- State: Telangana
- District: Vemsoor mandal, Khammam

Population (2001)
  - Total: 5,212

Languages
  - Official: Telugu
- Time zone: UTC+5:30 (IST)
- Vehicle registration: TS

Kandukuru is a village in the Vemsoor mandal of Khammam district, Telangana, India. It comes under Sathupalli assembly and Khammam Lokh Sabha constituencies.

In the 2001 census, the village had a population of 5,212.
