= Hardik Shah =

Private Secretary to the Prime Minister of India

Dr. Hardik Shah, IAS

Private Secretary to the Prime Minister of India
- Incumbent
- Assumed office July 2020
- Prime Minister: Narendra Modi
- Preceded by: Rajeev Topno

Personal details
- Born: 3 July 1973 (age 53) India
- Education: (PhD) Gujarat University; University of Manchester; Harvard University
- Occupation: Civil servant, IAS officer

Hardik Satishchandra Shah (born 3 July 1973) is an Indian Administrative Service officer of 2010 batch from Gujarat cadre who is currently serving as the Private Secretary to the Prime Minister of India, Narendra Modi since July 2020. He previously served as a Deputy Secretary in the Prime Minister's Office (India) (PMO) from August 2019 to July 2020.

== Education and early life ==
Shah holds degrees in BTech, MTech and law. He received his bachelor's degree in Law from Gujarat University. He did a post-graduate certificate in Environment Impact Assessment from the University of Manchester. He has done a PhD in environmental engineering from Gujarat University. He was also a fellow at the Harvard Kennedy School. He was selected for Indian Administrative Service in 2010.

He began his career as a junior engineer in the Gujarat Pollution Control Board (GPCB). He is given credit for making Gujarat Pollution Control Board's operations modern and transparent.

In 2017, Shah was handpicked by PM Narendra Modi as Private Secretary to the Union minister of environment, forest and climate change and information and broadcasting.

In August 2019, Hardik Shah was appointed as deputy secretary in the Prime Minister's Office (India) (PMO). Shah was also behind the PM Modi's national plan to control the plastic menace and environment conservation. He has played an important role in bringing key policy changes nationally in controlling environmental pollution and promoting environmental protection in states.

He has closely worked with Nobel laureates Abhijit Banerjee, Esther Duflo, professor Michael Greenstone and environmental engineer John Briscoe.

== Recognition ==
He received the 'Special Recognition Award' as a Member Secretary, GPCB for e-Governance under 'Environment Category' by CSI Nihilent e-Governance Awards 2009–2010. In 2013, he was awarded the AMA's Outstanding Manager of the Year Award 2013 by the Ahmedabad Management Association.
