= Kalluru revenue division =

Coordinates: 17.1415°N 79.6236°E

- Administrative division
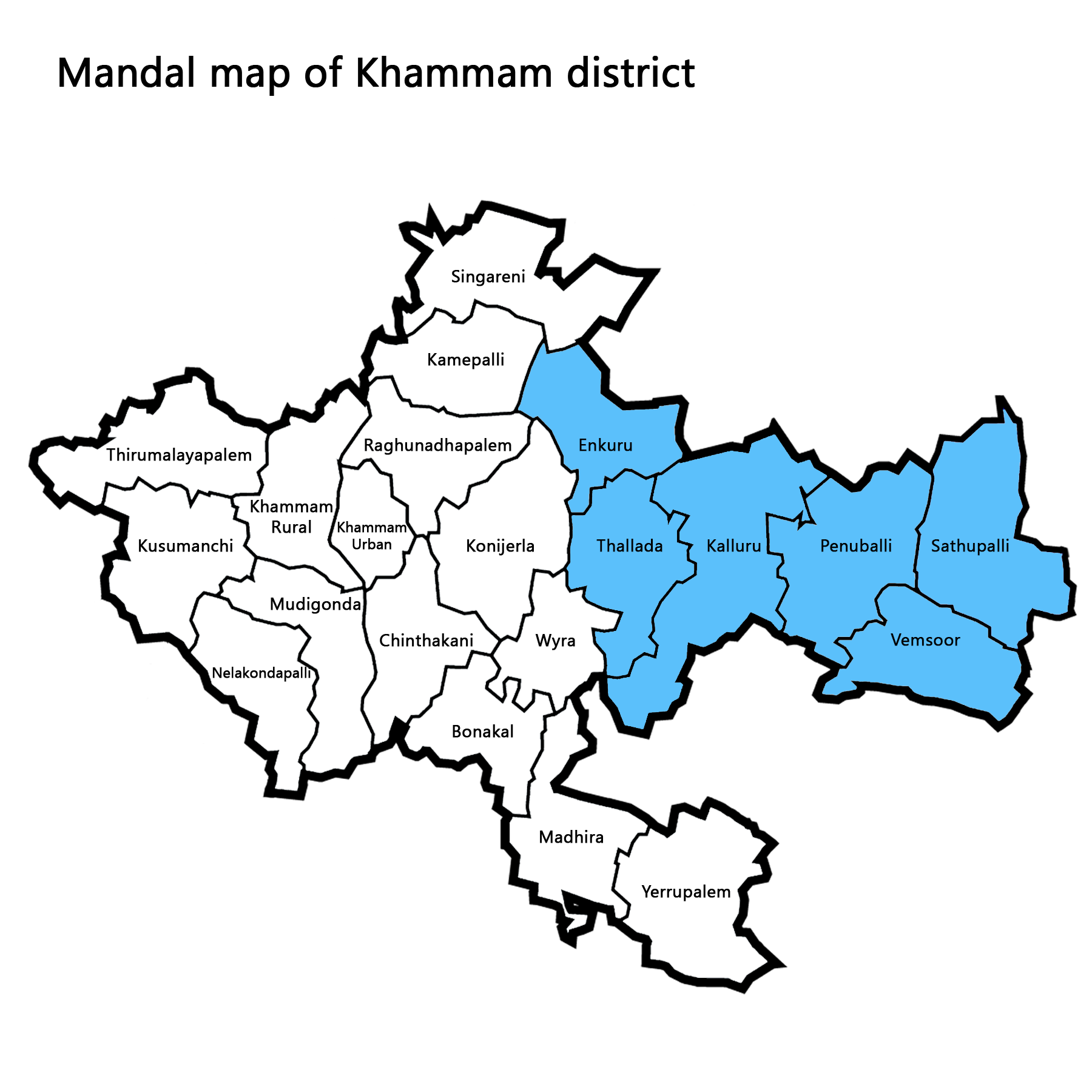
- Kalluru revenue division in blue

- Location in Telangana, India
- Country: India
- State: Telangana
- District: Khammam
- Time zone: UTC+5:30 (IST)

Kalluru revenue division (or Kalluru division) is an administrative division in the Khammam district of the Indian state of Telangana. It is one of the 2 revenue divisions in the district which consists of 6 mandals under its administration. Kallur is the divisional headquarters of the division.

== Mandals ==
The mandals in the division are:

S No.	Mandal Name
1	Enkuru mandal
2	Kalluru mandal
3	Penuballi mandal
4	Sathupalli mandal
5	Thallada mandal
6	Vemsoor mandal
