= Department of Industries & Commerce, Haryana =

Department of the Government of Haryana in India

Government of Haryana Department of Industries & Commerce, Haryana

Agency overview
- Jurisdiction: Government of Haryana
- Headquarters: Chandigarh; 30°45′40″N 76°48′2″E
- Agency executive: Dushyant Chautala, Deputy Chief Minister
- Website: http://haryanaindustries.nic.in/

Department of Industries & Commerce, Haryana is a Ministry and department of the government of Haryana in India.

== Description ==
This department came into existence when Haryana was established as a new state within India after being separated from Punjab. Manohar Lal is the chief minister responsible for this department .

== See also ==
- Government of Haryana
