= Vemsoor =

- Mandal
- Country: India
- State: Telangana
- District: Khammam
- Mandal: Vemsoor

Languages
  - Official: Telugu
- Time zone: UTC+5:30 (IST)
- PIN: 507164
- Telephone code: 08761
- Vehicle registration: TS 04
- Nearest city: Sathupalli
- Lok Sabha constituency: Khammam
- Vidhan Sabha constituency: Vemsoor (1952-1972)
- Vidhan Sabha constituency: Sathupalli (from 1978)
- Climate: tropical (Köppen)

Vemsoor(Telugu: వేంసూరు) is a village and mandal in Khammam district of Telangana, India and falls under Kalluru revenue division. The majority of the Vemsoor region is agrarian. Most of the people are farmers, peasants and daily laborers. The predominant crops grown in this region are rice, corn, tomatoes, red chilies, vegetables, mangoes, cashew etc. As a mandal headquarters it has several mandal administrative offices. It also has an Andhra bank branch.

== Election history ==
Up to 1948, Hyderabad State was a princely state after merging in Indian union on 17 September 1948 and named Hyderabad State in the first election in India in 1952. Vemsoor was an assembly constituency from 1951 to 1978. In 1967, Jalagam Vengal Rao won assembly elections second time from Vemsoor and in 1968 he became State Home Minister in the state government headed by Kasu Brahmananda Reddy and also he became chief minister from same constituency.

The following are election results of the Vemsoor assembly constituency from 1952 to 1972:

=== 1952 ===
1	Kandimalla Ramakrishna Rao	M	IND	16092	44.43%	Won
2	Jalagam Vengala Rao	M	IND	15543	42.92%	Lost
3	Bommakanti Satyanarayana Rao	M	INC	4580	12.65%	Lost

ELECTORS : 51987 VOTERS : 36215 POLL PERCENTAGE : 69.66% VALID VOTES 36215

=== 1957 ===
1	Jalagam Kondal Rao	M	INC	24680	56.79%	Won
2	Vattikonda Nageswara Rao	M	PDF	16943	38.99%	Lost
3	K. Srinivasa Rao	M	IND	1834	4.22%	Lost

ELECTORS : 57461 VOTERS : 43457 POLL PERCENTAGE : 75.63% VALID VOTES 43457

=== 1962 ===
1	Jalagam Vengala Rao	M	INC	36436	64.78%	Won
2	Vattikonda Nageswara Rao	M	CPI	17853	31.74%	Lost
3	Poranki Venkat Raju	M	IND	1960	3.48%	Lost

ELECTORS : 67732 VOTERS : 57794 POLL PERCENTAGE : 85.33% VALID VOTES 56249

=== 1967 ===
1	Jalagam Vengala Rao	M	INC	37595	70.66%	Won
2	Morampudi Venkaiah	M	IND	13220	24.85%	Lost
3	P. V. Raju	M	IND	2391	4.49%	Lost

ELECTORS : 69466 VOTERS : 55617 POLL PERCENTAGE : 80.06% VALID VOTES : 53206

=== 1972 ===
1	Jalagam Vengala Rao	M	INC	47173	80.24%	Won
2	Ravi Veera Venkaiah	M	IND	9101	15.48%	Lost
3	Poranki Venkat Raju	M	IND	2518	4.28%	Lost

ELECTORS : 85233 VOTERS : 60378 POLL PERCENTAGE : 70.84% VALID VOTES : 58792

== Demographics ==
- Total population: 42,908 in 10,337 households
- Male population: 21,845
- Female population: 21,063
- Children under 6 years of age: 5,220 (Boys - 2,683 and Girls - 2,537)
- Total literates: 22,079
- Vemsoor has facilities including a government hospital, a police station and a revenue office.
