= 1957 Indian general election in Andhra Pradesh =

General election in India

- November 1957

43 seats
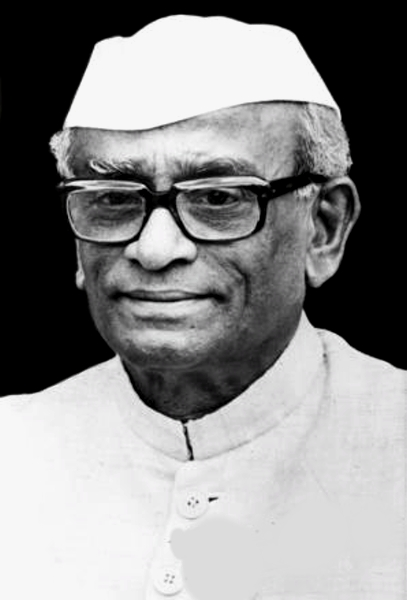
	First party	Second party
		CPI
Leader	Neelam Sanjiva Reddy	T. Nagi Reddy
Party	INC	CPI
Leader's seat	Not-participated	Anantapur
Last election	State not exist	State not exist
Seats won	37	2
Seat change	▲37	▲2
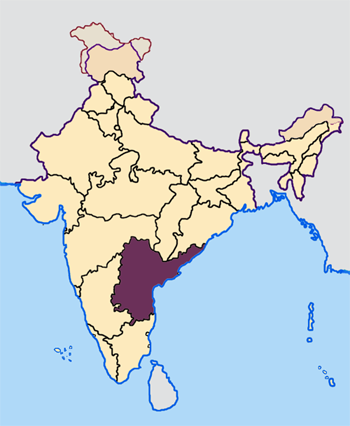
- Andhra Pradesh
Prime Minister before election
Jawaharlal Nehru
INC
Prime Minister after election
Jawaharlal Nehru
INC

The 1957 Indian general election polls were held in the Andhra Pradesh state for its 43 seats. The state was formed then recently in 1956 by combining the erstwhile Andhra state and Telugu-speaking areas of Hyderabad State. Indian National Congress has swept the elections by bagging 37 seats.

== Detailed Results ==
=== Results by Party ===
Party Name	Popular vote			Seats		
Party Name	Votes	%	±pp	Contested	Won	+/−
INC	49,06,044	51.47		43	37	
CPI						
PDF						
PSP						
BJS	3,769	0.04		1	0	
IND	18,35,800	19.26		39	2	Steady
Total	95,31,373	100%	-		43	-

=== Constituency Wise Results ===
Constituency			Winner				Runner Up				Margin	%
#	Name	Poll %	Candidate	Party	Votes	%	Candidate	Party	Votes	%	Margin	%
1	Srikakulam	36.76%	B. Rajagopala Rao	INC	84,797	55.34	Karimi Narayanappala Naidu	IND	68,441	44.66	16,356	10.68
2	Parvathipuram (Note: The seat was a two-member constituency, meaning both the first and second place candidates were declared elected.)	29.89%	B. Satyanarayana	INC	1,26,792	25.65	Dippala Suri Dora	IND	1,24,604	25.20	2,188	0.45
3	Visakhapatnam	36.83%	P. V. Gajapati Raju	IND	88,563	64.75	M. Krishna Rao	INC	27,449	20.07	61,114	44.68
4	Golugonda	30.05%	Missula S. Murti	INC	84,780	17.20	Kankipati Veeranna Padal	INC	84,738	17.19	42	0.01
5	Rajamundry	0.00%	Datla Satyanarayana Raju	INC	(Note: The seat was returned uncontested, so no election was held and the sole candidate was declared elected.)							
6	Kakinada	41.29%	B. S. Murthy	INC	2,04,319	27.39	Mosalakanti Tirumala Rao	INC	1,94,879	26.13	9,440	1.26
7	Narsapur	56.81%	Uddaraju Ramam	CPI	1,34,119	51.58	Manganti Bapineedu	INC	98,654	37.94	35,465	13.64
8	Eluru	53.88%	Mothey Vedakumari	INC	1,15,280	51.16	V. Vimla Devi	CPI	1,10,060	48.84	5,220	2.32
9	Gudivada	62.01%	D. Balarama Krishnaiah	INC	1,55,873	54.86	Kadiyala Gopala Rao	CPI	1,28,253	45.14	27,620	9.72
10	Vijayawada	58.94%	Komarraju Atchamamba	INC	1,16,861	48.74	Tammina Potha Raju	CPI	1,14,773	47.87	2,088	0.87
11	Masulipatnam	58.92%	Mandali Krishna Rao	INC	1,23,242	47.65	Y. Nagabhushanam	IND	1,15,691	44.73	7,551	2.92
12	Tenali	58.95%	N. G. Ranga	INC	1,49,811	55.24	Naraharisetti Venkataswamy	IND	1,21,394	44.76	28,417	10.48
13	Guntur	52.89%	K. Raghuramayya	INC	1,58,160	59.11	S.V.L. Narasimham	IND	99,205	37.08	58,955	22.03
14	Ongole	52.04%	Ronda Narapa Reddy	INC	1,36,582	54.95	Madala Narayana Swamy	CPI	1,11,963	45.05	24,619	9.90
15	Markapur	38.80%	Chegireddi Bali Reddy	INC	90,883	53.45	G. Yellamanda Reddy	CPI	72,078	42.39	18,805	11.06
16	Nellore	35.35%	B. Anjanappa	INC	2,20,121	35.40	Rebala Lakshmi N. Reddy	INC	2,00,077	32.17	20,044	3.23
17	Chittoor	27.94%	M. A. Ayyangar	INC	1,54,817	63.40	C. V. L. Narayan	IND	71,357	29.22	83,460	34.18
18	Rajampet	0.00%	T. N. Viswanath Reddy	INC	0	0.00	S. Hussain Shah	IND	0	0.00	0	0.00
19	Cuddapah	43.32%	V. Rami Reddy	INC	1,01,909	51.58	Yeddula Eswara Reddy	CPI	95,653	48.42	6,256	3.16
20	Anantapur	45.99%	T. Nagi Reddy	CPI	98,976	50.87	Paidi Lakshmayya	INC	88,175	45.32	10,801	5.55
21	Hindupur	27.33%	K. V. Ramakrishna	INC	66,560	60.69	K. S. Ragava Charyulu	PSP	40,072	36.54	26,488	24.15
22	Adoni	30.00%	P. Venkatasubbaiah	INC	83,295	70.63	Gadilinganna Gowd	PSP	34,642	29.37	48,653	41.26
23	Kurnool	24.44%	Osman Ali Khan	INC	81,621	79.04	B.R. Bhima Rao	IND	14,342	13.89	67,279	65.15
24	Mahbubnagar	42.05%	J. Rameshwar Rao	INC	1,89,093	29.23	Puli Rama Swamy	INC	1,46,601	22.66	42,492	6.57
25	Hyderabad	41.10%	Vinayak Rao	INC	77,153	66.16	C. Srikishan	IND	19,795	16.97	57,358	49.19
26	Secunderabad	43.08%	Ahmed Mohiuddin	INC	98,203	66.69	S.B. Giri	PSP	49,055	33.31	49,148	33.38
27	Vicarabad	0.00%	Sangam Laxmi Bai	INC								
28	Medak	49.94%	P. Hanmanth Rao	INC	1,06,511	56.32	Maqdum Mohiuddin	PDF	82,610	43.68	23,901	12.64
29	Nizamabad	45.70%	Harish Heda	INC	1,10,646	60.21	G. Raja Ram	IND	73,117	39.79	37,529	20.42
30	Adilabad	48.28%	K. Ashanna	INC	91,287	51.67	C. Madhav Reddy	PSP	85,375	48.33	5,912	3.34
31	Karimnagar	48.98%	M. R. Krishna	INC	1,58,820	21.67	M. Sri Ranga Rao	INC	1,41,680	19.33	17,140	2.34
32	Warangal	58.13%	Sadath Ali Khan	INC	1,07,249	53.75	Pendyala Raghava Rao	PDF	92,294	46.25	14,955	7.50
33	Mahbubabad	53.82%	E. Madhusudhan Rao	INC	1,03,964	51.81	S. Ramanadham	PDF	96,708	48.19	7,256	3.62
34	Khammam	63.97%	T. B. Vittal Rao	PDF	1,06,627	44.27	Kolipak Kishan Rao	INC	1,01,090	41.97	5,537	2.30
35	Nalgonda	54.03%	D. V. Rao	PDF	2,41,512	28.10	D. Rajiah	INC	2,12,035	24.67	29,477	3.43
