= Dubbak =

Dubbak can refer to any of the following places in Telangana, India:

- Dubbak, Medak, a village in Medak district
  - Dubbak (Assembly constituency), a constituency of the Telangana Legislative Assembly in Medak district
- Dubbak, Nalgonda, a village in Nalgonda district
- Dubbak, Nizamabad, a village in Nizamabad district

== See also ==
- Dubbaka
