= Ameenpur =

- Town
- Location in Telangana, India Ameenpur (Telangana) Ameenpur (India)
- Coordinates: 17.524124°N 78.324231°E
- Country: India
- State: Telangana
- District: Sangareddy
- Mandal: Ameenpur
- Metro: Hyderabad
- Established: 1550 A.D
- Founder: Abdul Qadir Amin Khan
- Named for: Abdul Qadir Amin Khan

Government
  - Type: Municipal Corporation
  - Body: Cyberabad Municipal Corporation

Area
  - Total: 8.35 km^{2} (3.22 sq mi)

Population
  - Total: 150,000
  - Density: 18,000/km^{2} (47,000/sq mi)
- Demonym: Ameenpurite

Languages
  - Official: Telugu
- Time zone: UTC+5:30 (IST)
- PIN: 502033
- Telephone code: 040
- Vehicle registration: TG 15
- Lok Sabha constituency: Medak
- Assembly constituency: Patancheru
- Website: ameenpurmunicipality.telangana.gov.in cmc.telangana.gov.in

Ameenpur is a satellite town of Hyderabad in Ameenpur mandal of Sangareddy district in the Indian state of Telangana. The locality is famous for the scenic Ameenpur Lake.

== History ==
Ameenpur was established around 1550 A.D. during the Qutb Shahi dynasty era by Abdul Qadir Amin Khan, a high-ranking official, after whom the locality was named.

== Biodiversity and Environment ==
=== Ameenpur Lake ===
Ameenpur Lake is a man-made body of water dating back to the Qutb Shahi period. In November 2016, the Ministry of Environment declared Ameenpur Lake as India's first urban Biodiversity Heritage Site under the Biological Diversity Act, 2002.

The lake is a major stopover for migratory birds and home to diverse fauna, including over 160 bird species such as flamingos, pelicans, and various species of kingfishers and herons.

== Geography and Connectivity ==
Ameenpur is situated in the Sangareddy district of Telangana, functioning as a satellite municipality within the Hyderabad Metropolitan Area. It lies in close proximity to major residential and commercial hubs such as Miyapur, Chanda Nagar, and HITEC City in the real estate boom of early 2000s. The area however, suffers due to lack of proper civic amenities.

== Governance and Administration ==
Ameenpur is administered as a Municipality within the Sangareddy district in the Indian state of Telangana. It falls under the administrative jurisdiction of the Hyderabad Metropolitan Development Authority (HMDA) and is part of the Patancheru Assembly constituency and the Medak Parliamentary Constituency.

The municipality is divided into administrative wards managed by elected ward councillors and a municipal chairperson responsible for local infrastructure, sanitation, and water supply. After merging of Municipalities in 2025 , Currently it is administered under Cyberabad Municipal Corporation. Ameenpur forms a circle under Serilingampally Zone of Cyberabad Municipal Corporation.

== Transport and Connectivity ==
Ameenpur is integrated into the transit network of Western Hyderabad:

- Roadways: The suburb connects to NH-65 (Mumbai Highway) via Miyapur and Chanda Nagar. It also has access to the Hyderabad Outer Ring Road (ORR) at Sultanpur and Patancheru junctions.
- Public Transit: TGSRTC operates regular bus services connecting Ameenpur to Miyapur, Kukatpally, Secunderabad, and Patancheru.
- Metro and Rail: The nearest metro station is the Miyapur Metro Station on the Red Line of Hyderabad Metro, located approximately 4 km away. The nearest suburban rail access is the Chanda Nagar MMTS Station.

== Civic and Environmental Issues ==
Despite its rapid suburban expansion, Ameenpur faces major infrastructure and environmental challenges:

- Waste Management: A temporary garbage transfer station in the area gradually evolved into an unmanaged dumping ground, leading to protests by resident welfare associations regarding foul odors and open waste burning.
- Sewage and Contamination: Untreated industrial effluents and domestic sewage from neighboring areas enter Ameenpur Lake, threatening its biodiversity tag. Proposed Sewage Treatment Plants (STPs) in residential zones have sparked local petition drives.
- Lake Encroachments: Encroachment on the lake bed and buffer zones has led to urban flooding during heavy monsoon rains. Agencies such as the Telangana Hyderabad Disaster Response and Asset Protection Agency (HYDRAA) have engaged in anti-encroachment drives to reclaim lake catchment areas.

=== Notable Avian Species ===
The Ameenpur Lake ecosystem hosts numerous resident and migratory species:

Common Name	Scientific Name	Status in Ameenpur
Greater flamingo	Phoenicopterus roseus	Migratory
Spot-billed pelican	Pelecanus philippensis	Migratory
Painted stork	Mycteria leucocephala	Resident / Breeding
White-throated kingfisher	Halcyon smyrnensis	Resident
Grey heron	Ardea cinerea	Resident
Black-headed ibis	Threskiornis melanocephalus	Migratory

== Real Estate and Demographics ==
=== Real Estate Expansion ===
Driven by its proximity to the West Hyderabad IT corridor (including HITEC City, Gachibowli, and the Financial District), Ameenpur has transitioned from an agrarian and industrial satellite village into a major residential suburb. The expansion of the Miyapur metro station network and connectivity via the Outer Ring Road (ORR) made the region a catchment area for mid-segment and luxury real estate developments.

The locality features a diverse mix of housing formats, including standalone apartment complexes, high-rise residential towers, gated villa communities, and open plotted layouts. Major regional real estate developers have executed high-density gated projects along the Ameenpur–Beeramguda corridor, offering integrated amenities such as clubhouses, high-rise skywalks, and landscaped green zones near Ameenpur Lake.

=== Demographic Shift ===
Historically populated by local agricultural communities and industrial workers employed in the neighboring BHEL industrial township, Ameenpur's demographic composition changed significantly starting in the 2010s:

- IT Workforce Influx: Software professionals and corporate employees working in Western Hyderabad migrated to Ameenpur due to lower property acquisition costs and rental yields compared to central tech hubs like Kondapur and Madhapur.
- Cosmopolitan Community: Rapid urbanization brought a multi-state migratory demographic, leading to the establishment of international K–12 educational institutions, commercial retail complexes, and private healthcare infrastructure within municipal limits.
- Resident Welfare Associations (RWAs): Suburban growth led to the formation of civic action groups and RWAs active in lake conservation efforts, municipal waste management petitions, and anti-encroachment advocacy.

== Ameenpur concerns ==
Residents in Ameenpur, Hyderabad, face severe civic and environmental concerns, notably poor infrastructure, lake pollution, and a mismanaged dumping yard.

=== Issues ===
- Dumping Yard & Waste: A localized dumping yard intended as a temporary transfer station has turned into a massive dump ground. Frequent waste burning and unbearable stenches affect around 30 colonies.
- Sewage Treatment Plants (STPs): Authorities proposed massive STPs (such as 28 MLD and 100 MLD plants) in or dangerously close to residential neighborhoods. Residents strongly oppose this and have launched campaigns like the Ameenpur STP Petition on Change.org.
- Lake Contamination & Encroachments: Untreated sewage and industrial waste continuously pollute the Ameenpur Lake ecosystem. Additionally, regulatory bodies like HYDRAA have had to intervene to demolish illegal encroachments and resolve issues where lakes have submerged residential layouts.
- Basic Civic Amenities: Locals face a double whammy of stalled infrastructure development combined with heavy taxes. Chronic problems include raw drainage overflowing onto freshly built roads and non-functional streetlights creating dangerous, unlit stretches for commuters at night.
- Delay in Projects: Elixir City is a 200 acres (0.81 km^{2}) medical city at Ameenpur that is being planned by HMDA, with a focus on medical tourism. As of 2012, this project is on hold.
