= Ameenpur Lake =

- Pedda Cheruvu
- అమీనాపూర్ చెరువు (Telugu)
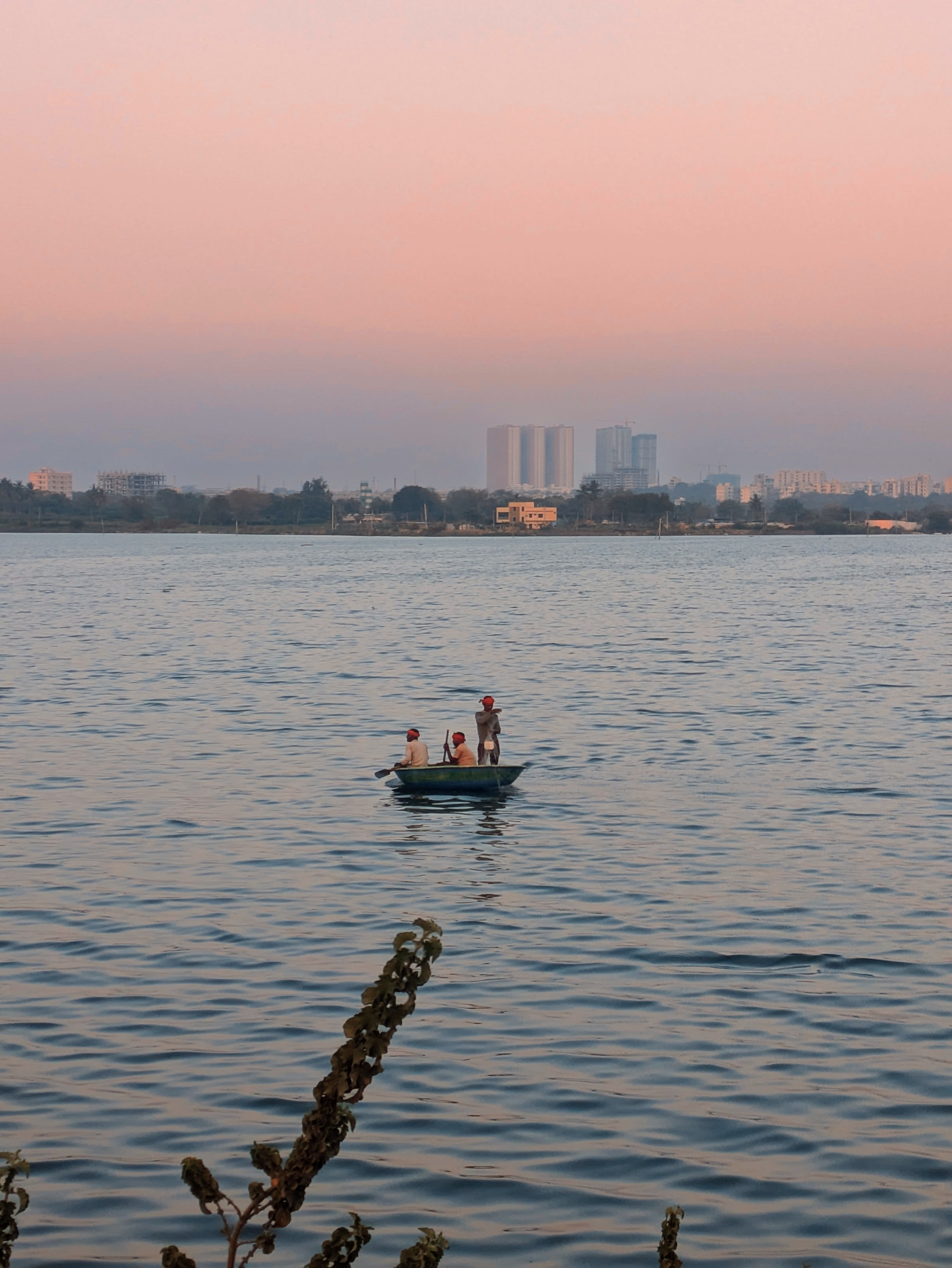

- Location in Telangana Ameenpur Lake (India)
- Location: Ameenpur, Sangareddy district, Hyderabad, India
- Coordinates: 17°31′27″N 78°19′50″E
- Type: Artificial lake
- Surface area: 93 acres (0.38 km^{2})
- Max. depth: 8 metres (26 ft)
- Surface elevation: 530 metres (1,740 ft)
- Frozen: Never

Ameenpur Lake is a small lake in Sangareddy District in the Indian state of Telangana and on the edge of the city of Hyderabad. It is the first body of water in India to be recognised as a Biodiversity Heritage Site and is the first biodiversity site to be approved in an urban area.

== Description ==
Ameenpur Lake is on the northwestern fringes of Hyderabad and is a man-made lake that was reportedly constructed more than 300 years ago during the reign of Ibrahim Qutb Shah (1550–1580 AD) by a courtier, Abdul Qadir Amin Khan of Patancheru, to irrigate his gardens. The garden no longer exists, but the lake has survived. The lake is surrounded by undulating terrain with rocky outcrops and rocky formations which lie in the midst of an urban sprawl, surrounded by factories, villages, and modern apartments.

Ameenpur once occupied an area of more than 300 acres (1.2 km^{2}) but, due to encroachment, the lake currently covers an area of 93 acres (0.38 km^{2}).

== Wildlife ==
Various resident and migratory birds, such as flamingos, egrets, herons, cormorants, kingfishers, and river terns, visit the lake. Ameenpur Lake is a major spot for birdwatchers in Hyderabad.

In 2017, it was reported that the lake was home to 8 species of mammals, 166 birds, 45 herpetofauna (12 amphibians and 34 reptiles), 9 species of fish, and 143 invertebrates (26 aquatic beetles, 41 butterflies, 18 odonates, 25 arachnids, and 33 other invertebrates).

== Gallery ==
Ameenpur Lake

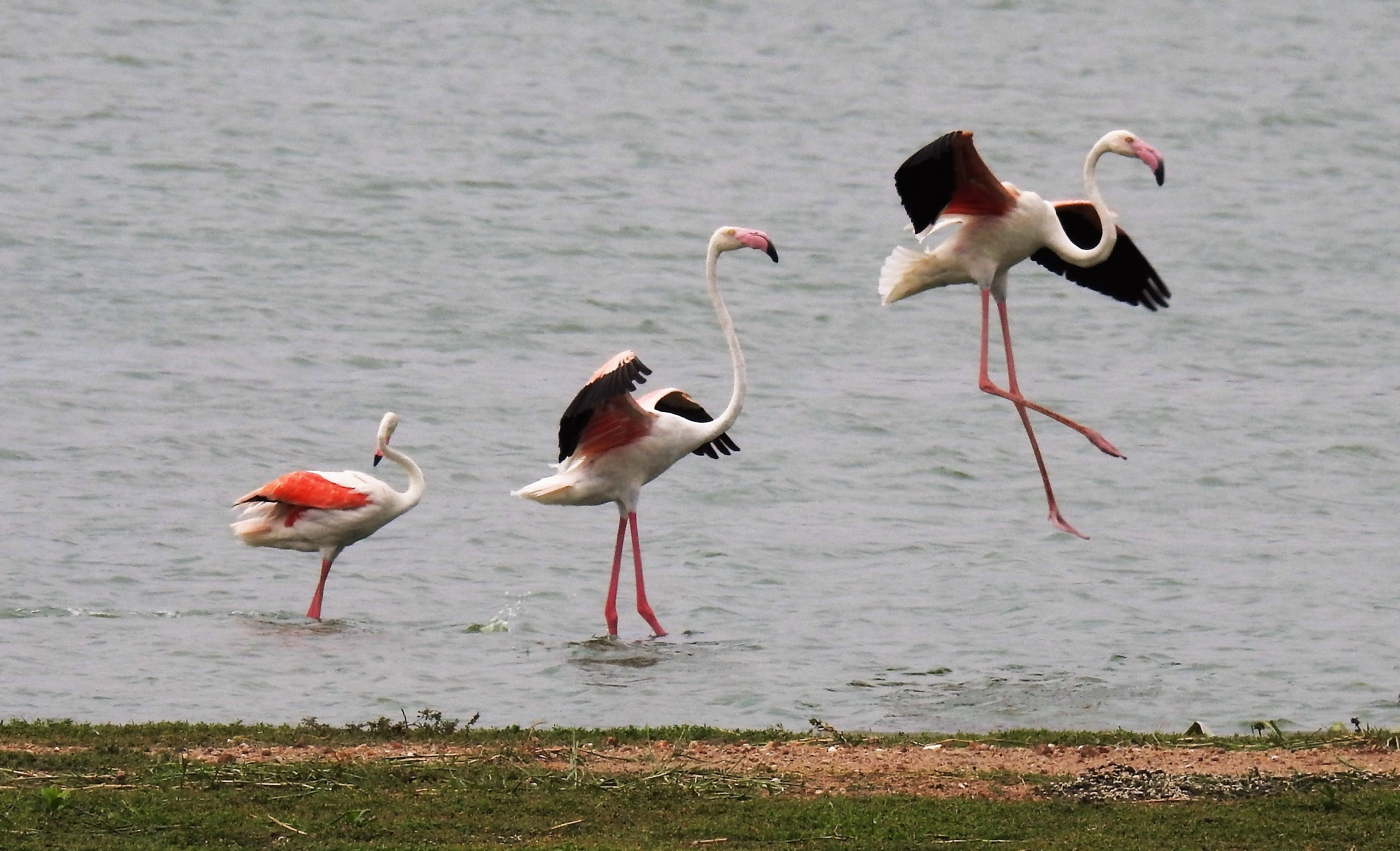
Flamingos at Ameenpur

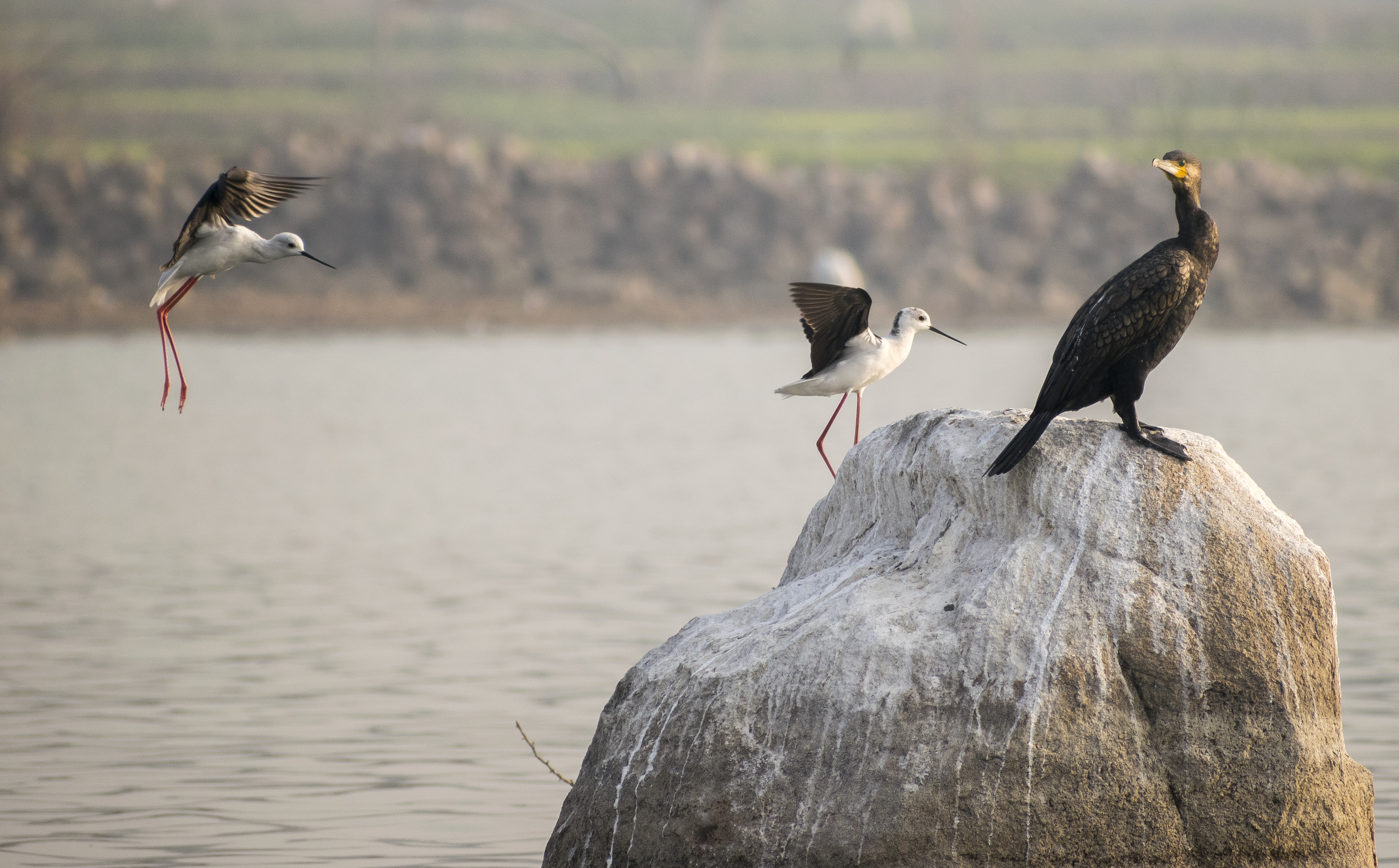
Black-winged stilts and a Cormorant at Ameenpur lake

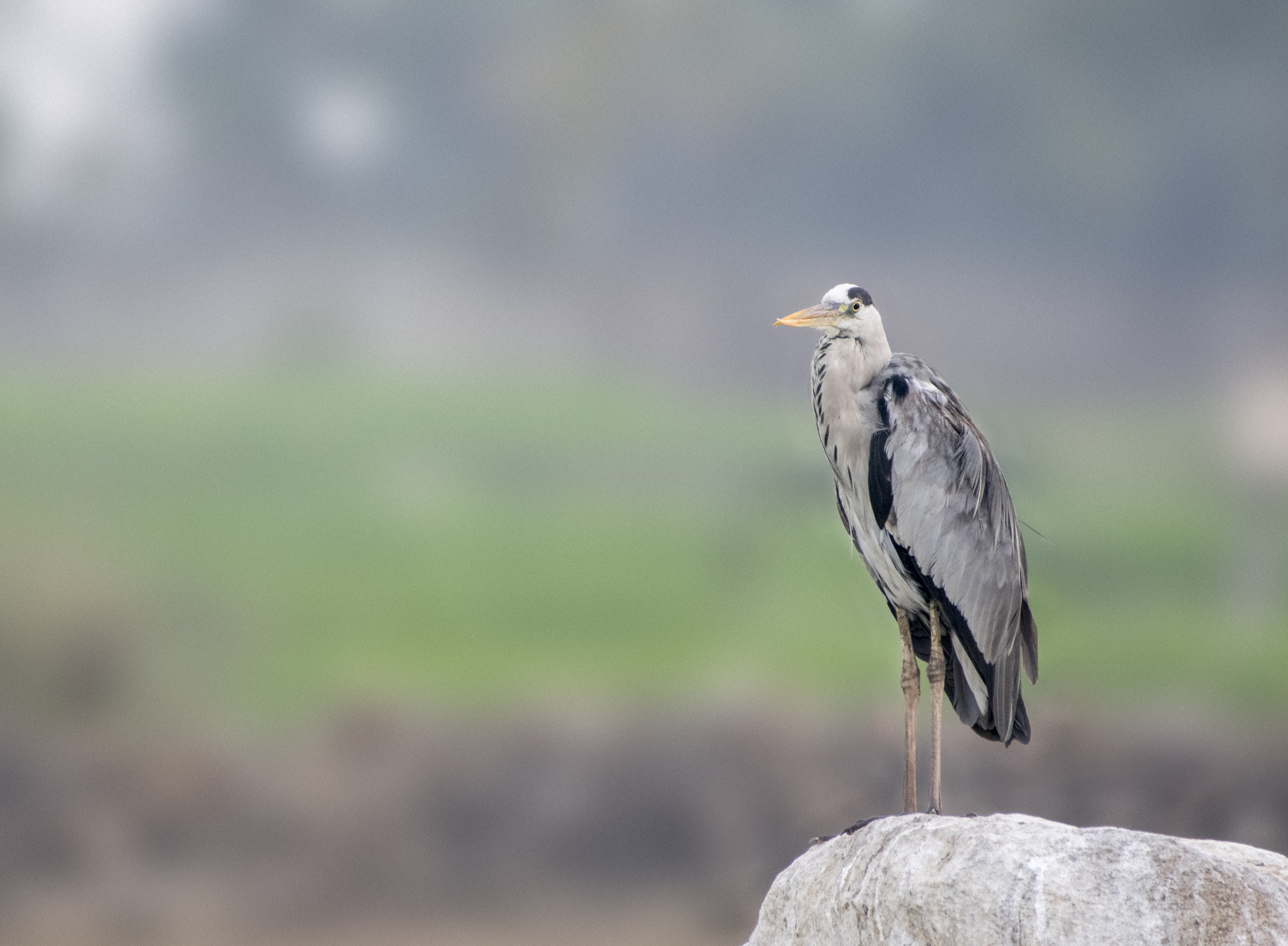
Grey Heron waiting for sunrise at Ameenpur lake

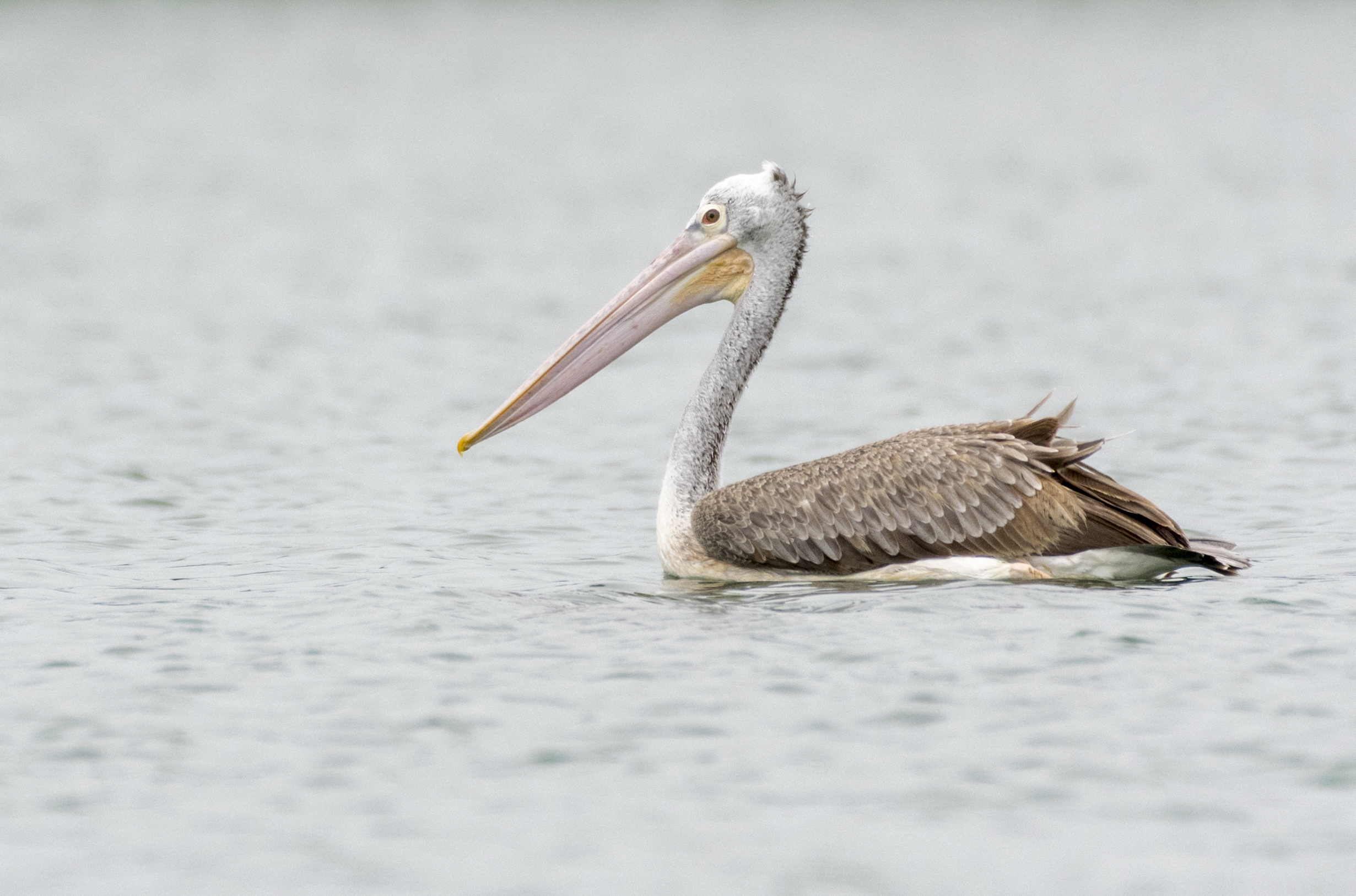
Spot Billed Pelican

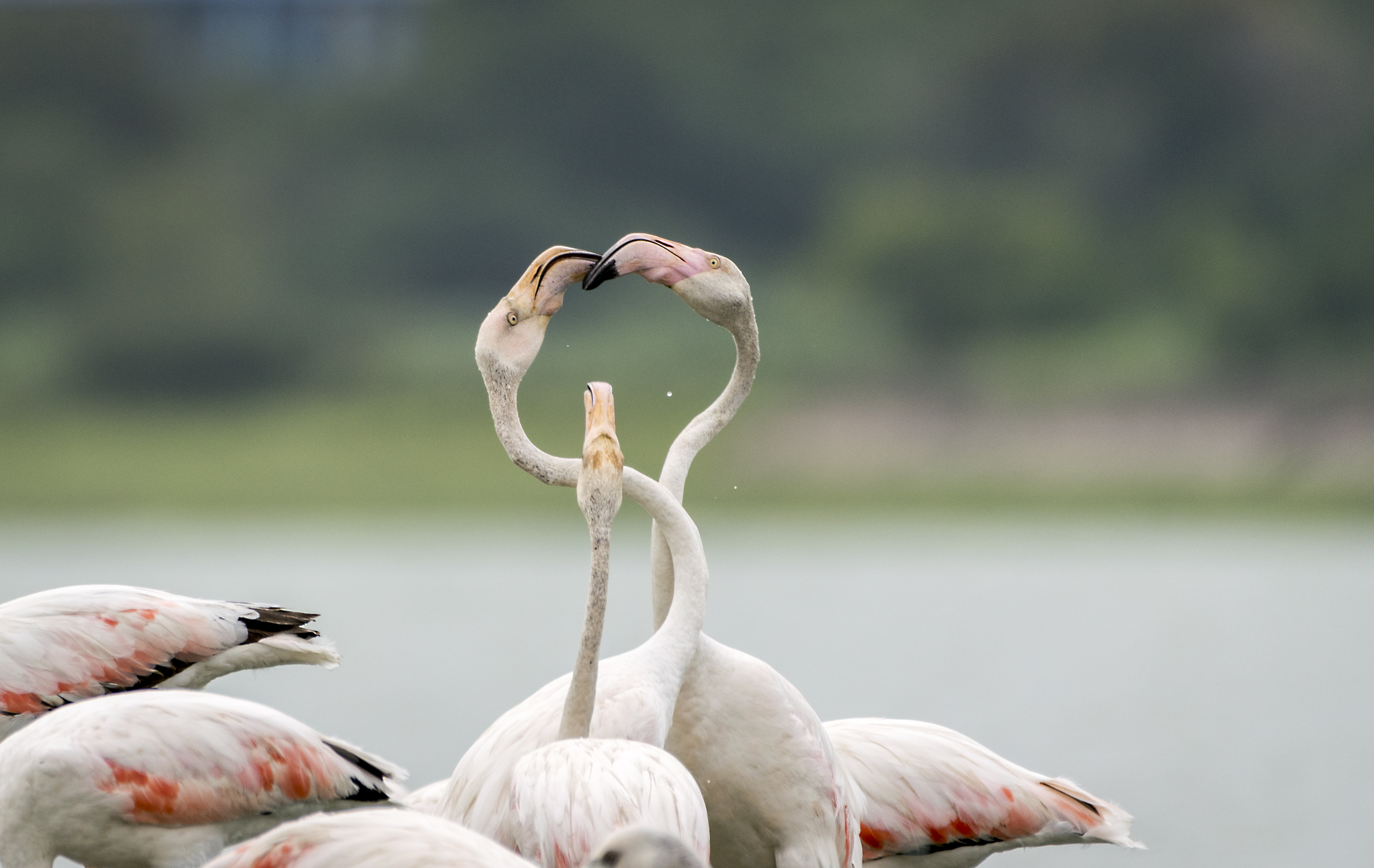
Greater Flamingos

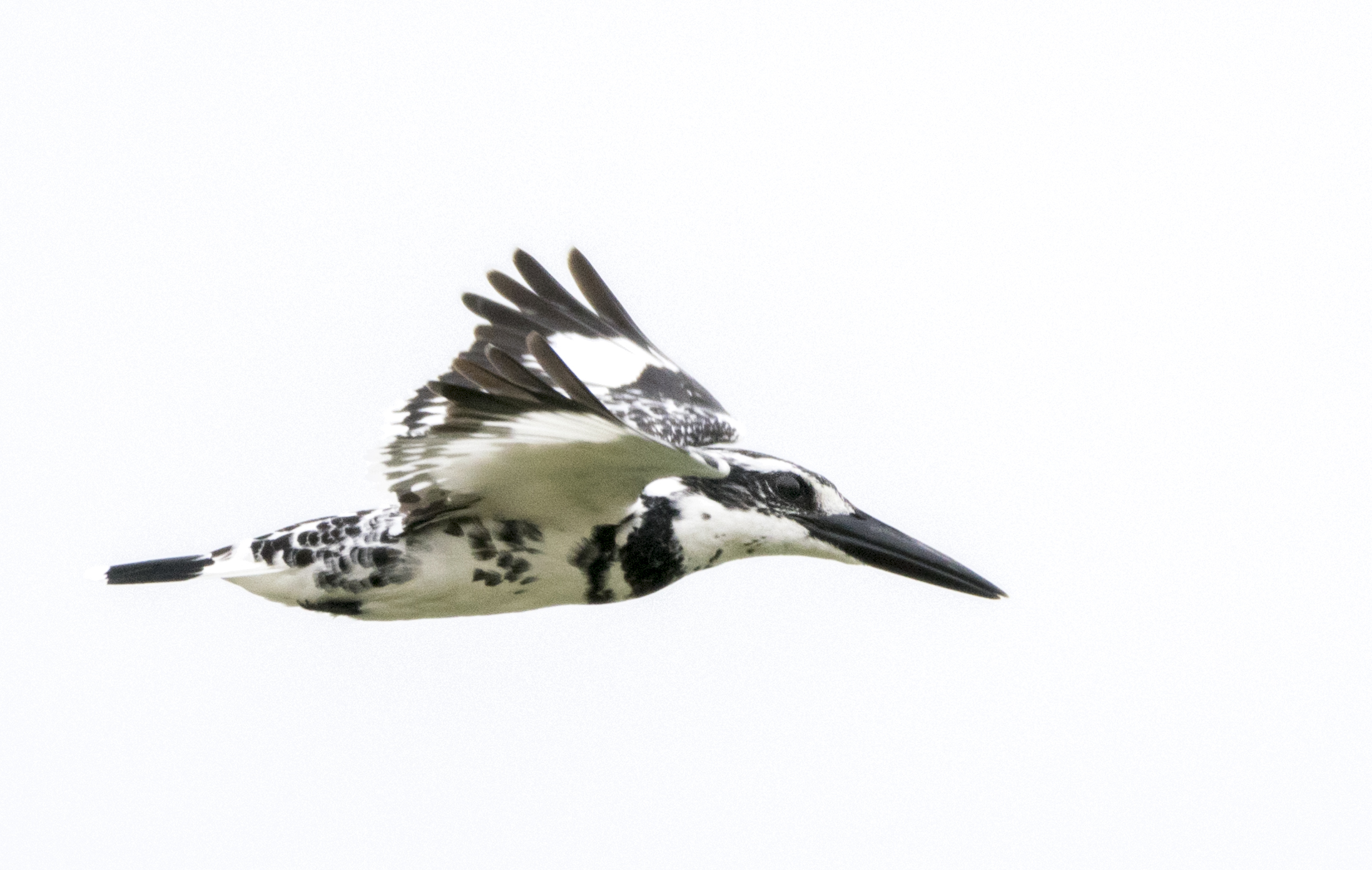
Pied Kingfisher

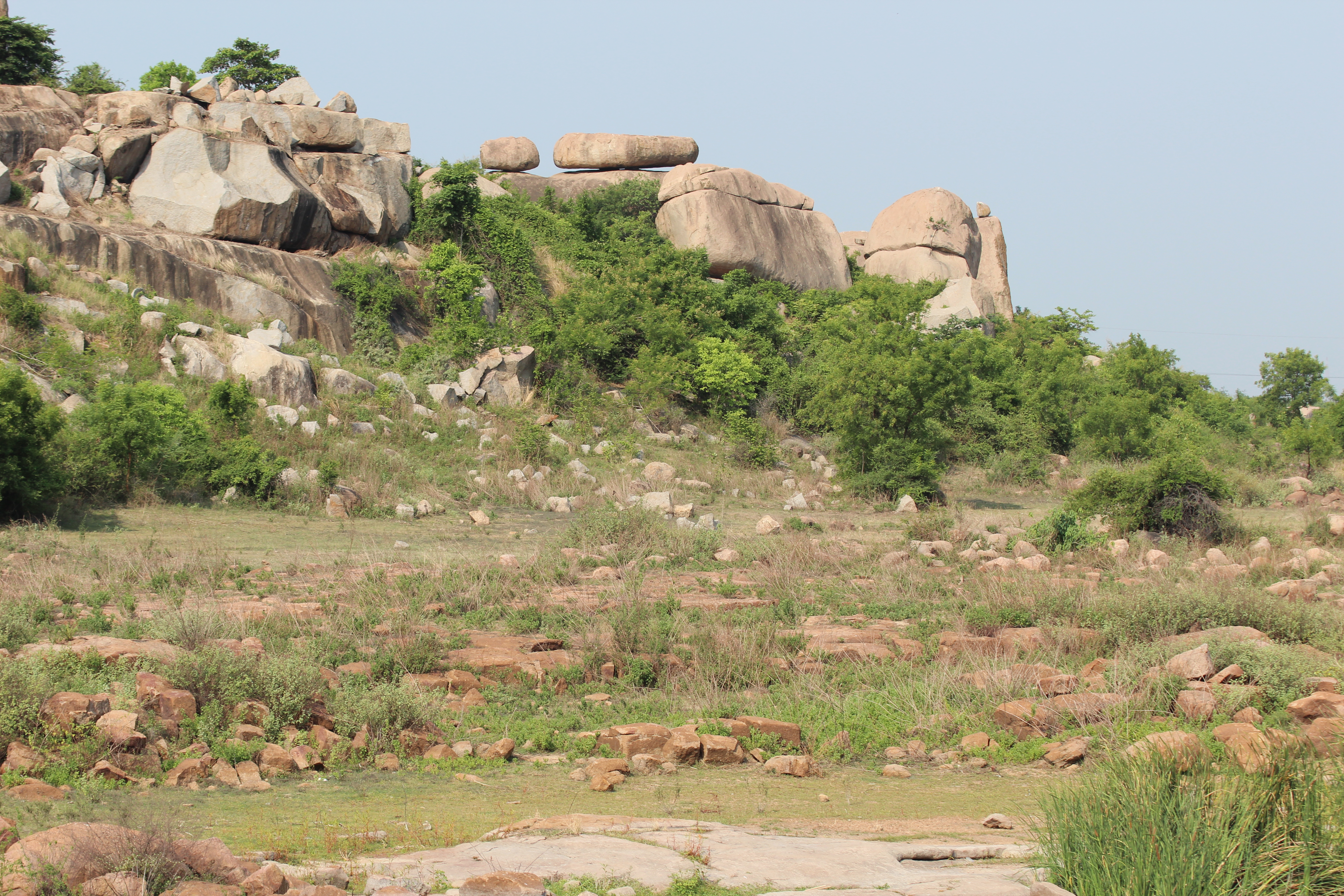
Rocky area near the Ameenpur lake

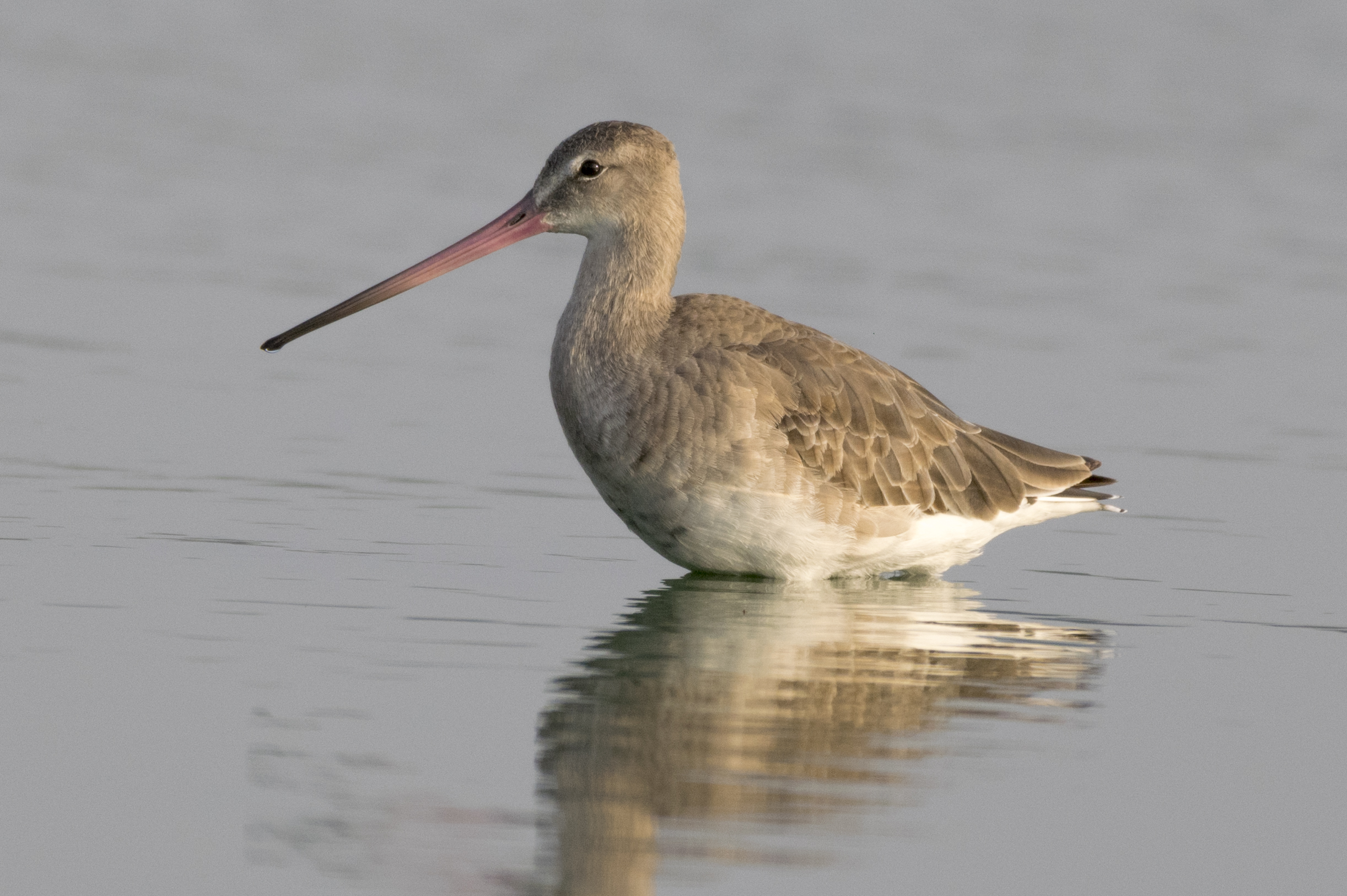
Black-tailed godwit

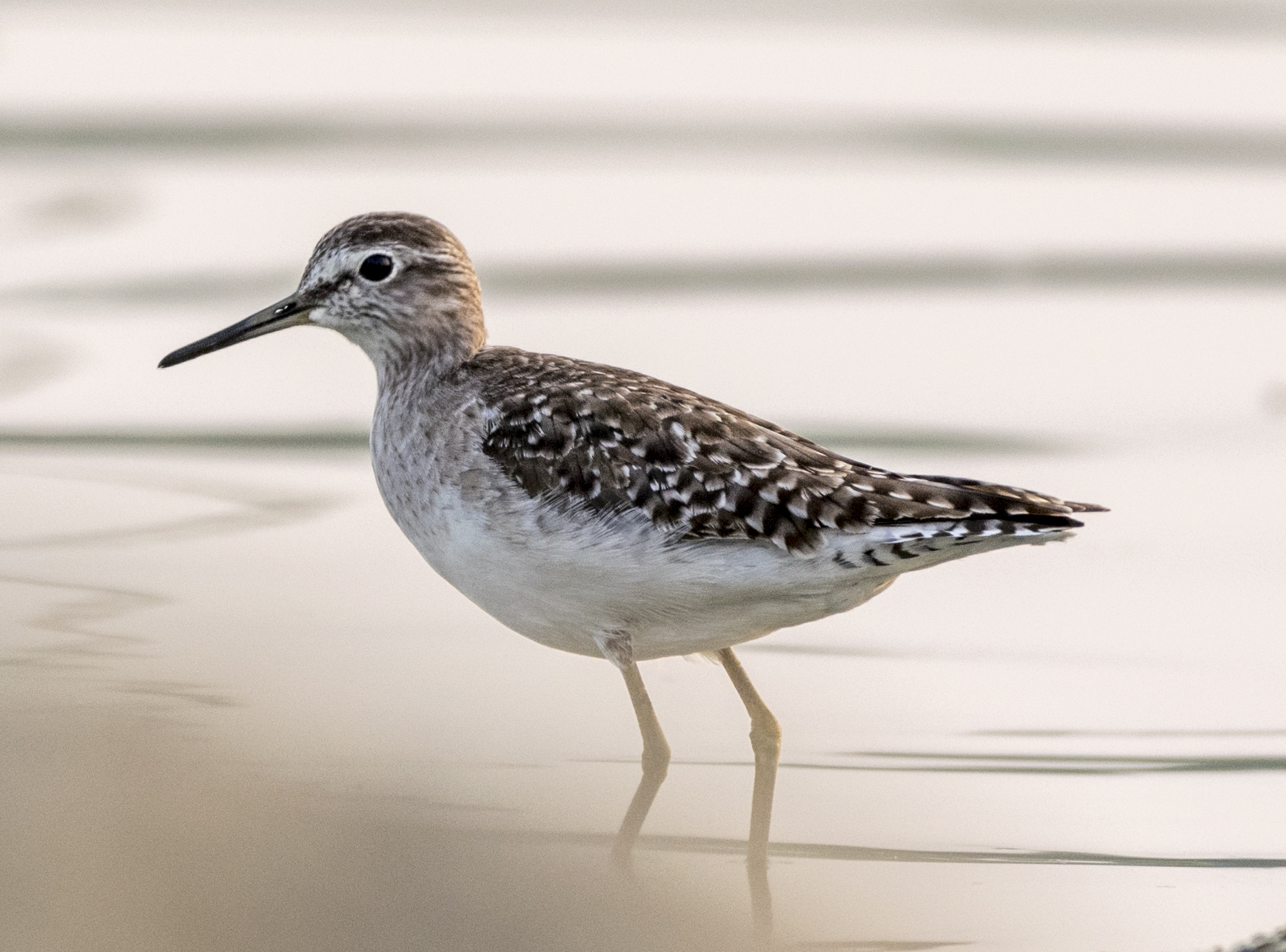
Wood Sandpiper

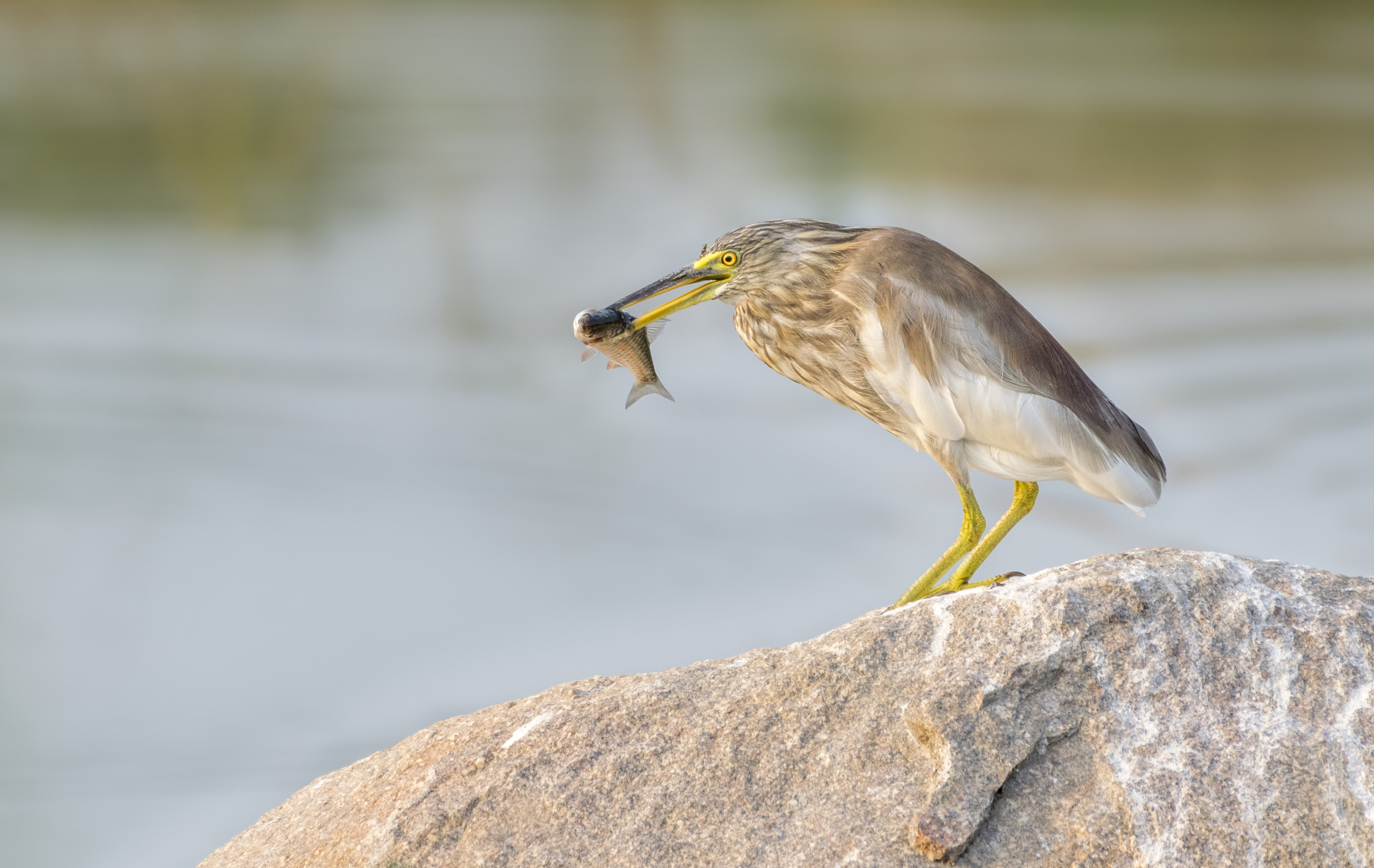
Indian Pond heron having a quick meal

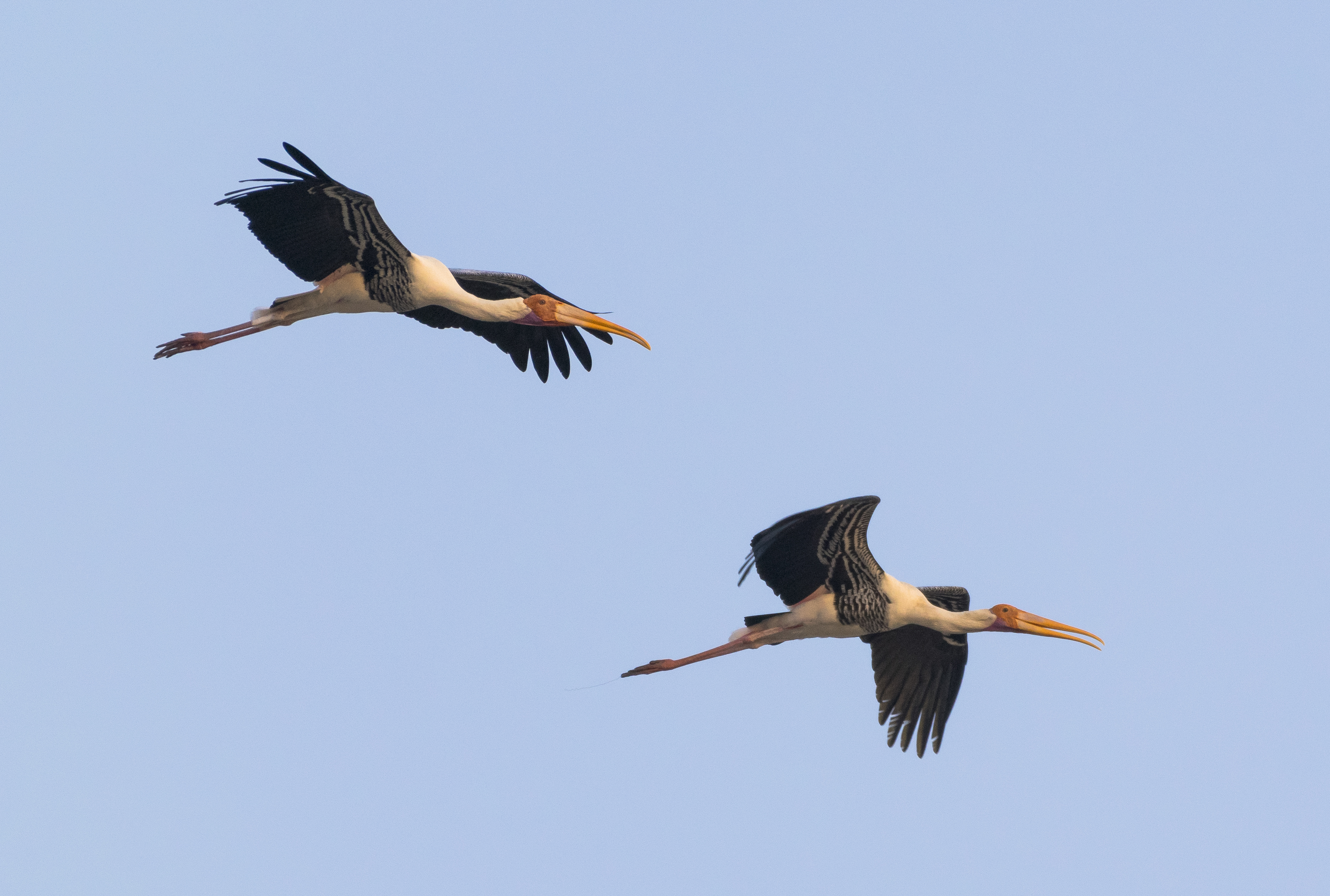
Painted Storks

== Biodiversity site ==
Ameenpur was declared as a Biodiversity Heritage Site in November 2016 by the Ministry of Environment under the Biological Diversity Act 2002 because of the large number of migratory birds that thrive there.

== Tourism ==
Ameenpur is ranked by TripAdvisor as 143rd of 242 things to do in Hyderabad.
