= Dubbaka =

- Town
- Location in Telangana, India Dubbaka (India)
- Coordinates: 18°10′28″N 78°40′00″E
- Country: India
- State: Telangana
- District: Siddipet

Government
  - Type: Member of Legislative Assembly, Kotha Prabhakar Reddy, BRS

Area
  - Total: 26.40 km^{2} (10.19 sq mi)

Population (2011)
  - Total: 29,600
  - Density: 1,120/km^{2} (2,900/sq mi)

Languages
  - Official: Telugu
- Time zone: UTC+5:30 (IST)
- PIN: 502108
- Telephone code: 08457
- Vehicle registration: TG 36
- Lok Sabha constituency: Medak

Dubbaka is a Municipal town in Siddipet district of the Indian state of Telangana.

== Government and politics ==
Municipal administration

Dubbaka Municipality was constituted on 31 January 2013 and is classified as a second grade municipality. The jurisdiction of the civic body is spread over an area of 26.40 km^{2} (10.19 mi^{2}).

=== Political ===
Solipeta Ramalinga Reddy (died August 2020) of the TRS party was elected four times as the town's MLA. Now Raghunandan Rao of BJP won bypoll Nov 2020

Dubbaka is a newly formed Assembly constituency in Siddipet District. It consists of 7 mandals: Dubbaka, Mirdoddi, Thoguta, Doultabad, Raipol, Chegunta and Narsingi.
