= Solipeta Ramalinga Reddy =

Indian politician (died 2020)

Member of the Telangana Legislative Assembly
- In office 02 June 2014 – 06 August 2020
- Preceded by: Cheruku Muthyam Reddy
- Succeeded by: Raghunandan Rao
- Constituency: Dubbak Assembly constituency

Personal details
- Born: 2 October 1961
- Died: 6 August 2020 (aged 58) Hyderabad, Telangana, India

Solipeta Ramalinga Reddy (1962/63 – 6 August 2020) was an Indian politician, a member of the Telangana Legislative Assembly.

Before becoming a politician, Reddy had worked as a journalist for a paper in the Medak District of Telangana. He was elected four times as the representative for Dubbaka and was prominent in Telangana's campaign for statehood. On 31 July 1990 he was arrested under the Terrorist and Disruptive Activities (Prevention) Act. In July 2020 he underwent surgery for a circulation problem, but it was unsuccessful.

== Family background ==
Solipeta Ramalinga Reddy's wife's name is Solipeta Sujatha. After the death of Solipeta Ramalinga Reddy, she contested from TRS in Dubbaka Assembly Constituency but she lost to BJP candidate. His son's name is Solipeta Sathish Reddy who is also an active TRS State Youth Leader.
