= Raghunandan Rao =

Indian politician

Madhavaneni Raghunandan Rao

Member of Parliament, Lok Sabha
- Incumbent
- Assumed office 4 June 2024
- Preceded by: Kotha Prabhakar Reddy
- Constituency: Medak

Member of the Telangana Legislative Assembly
- In office 10 November 2020 – 3 December 2023
- Preceded by: Solipeta Ramalinga Reddy
- Succeeded by: Kotha Prabhakar Reddy
- Constituency: Dubbak

Personal details
- Born: March 23, 1968 (age 58) Siddipet, Telangana, India
- Party: Bharatiya Janata Party
- Other political affiliations: BRS, Congress
- Spouse: Manjula Devi ( m. 1991 )
- Children: 1
- Nickname: Raghu Anna

Madhavaneni Raghunandan Rao (born 23 March 1968) is an Indian politician from Telangana state and a member of parliament representing from Medak Lok Sabha constituency. Previously he served as an MLA for Dubbak Assembly constituency. He is a strong supporter of Telangana state ideology. He is a lawyer by profession. He hails from Medak district.

== Early life and education ==
Rao was born at Siddipet to M. Bhagavantha Rao in Velama caste. He earned a B.Sc. degree at Siddipet Degree College, completed a L.L.B. degree at Osmania University, Hyderabad, a B.Ed. degree from Karnataka University, and a post-graduate diploma in human rights from Central University of Hyderabad.

After completing his education, Rao relocated from Siddipet to Patancheru, an industrial area, in 1991 and joined a reputed Telugu daily newspaper Eenadu as a news contributor for five years. He subsequently, enrolled as an advocate in the bar association of the High Court of Andhra Pradesh.

== Professional career ==
He started his career as a lawyer. He is well known for handling Hyderabad MP Asaduddin Owaisi's bail petition.

== Political career ==
Rao started his political career as a Telangana Rashtra Samithi member. He was with Telangana Rashtra Samithi from 27 April 2001. He is the politburo member and Medak district convenor. On 14 May 2013 he was suspended from the Telangana Rashtra Samithi party on allegations of meeting with Telugu Desam Party president N. Chandrababu Naidu which he actively denied. Subsequently, he joined in Congress But resigned to party within few days and joined BJP then contested the Legislative Assembly elections from Dubbak constituency of Telangana state in the year 2014. He is state party secretary and former MLA of Bharatiya Janata Party in Telangana. He was a Member of Legislative Assembly in Telangana Dubbak in 2020 by-poll election by a margin of 1,074 votes, after death of Solipeta Ramalinga Reddy.

Raghunandan Rao In 2023 Assembly elections contested from Dubbak Assembly segment and lost to BRS Candidate Kotha Prabhakar Reddy by a margin of 53,513 votes. His Contested in 2024 Lok Sabha polls from Medak and won with a majority of 39139 votes on his nearest opponent from Congress Party Neelam Madhu.

== Electroal History ==
Year	Constituency	Party	Votes	%	Opponent	Opponent Party	Opponent Votes	%	Result	Margin	%
2014	Dubbak	BJP	15,131	9.82%	Solipeta Ramalinga Reddy	TRS	82,234	53.37%	Lost	-67,103	-43.55%
2018	Dubbak	BJP	22,595	13.75%	Solipeta Ramalinga Reddy	TRS	89,299	54.36%	Lost	-66,704	-40.61%
2019	Medak	BJP	201,567	17.50%	Kotha Prabhakar Reddy	TRS	596,048	51.80%	Lost	-394,481	-34.30%
2020 (By)	Dubbak	BJP	63,352	38.47%	Solipeta Sujatha Reddy	TRS	62,273	37.82%	Won	1,079	0.65%
2023	Dubbak	BJP	44,366	25.39%	Kotha Prabhakar Reddy	BRS	97,879	56.01%	Lost	-53,513	-30.62%
2024	Medak	BJP	471,217	34.00%	Neelam Madhu	INC	432,078	31.20%	Won	39,139	2.80%
