= Patancheru Assembly constituency =

Constituency of the Telangana legislative assembly in India

Coordinates: 17.52°N 78.26°E

Patancheru
- Constituency No. 40 for the Telangana Legislative Assembly
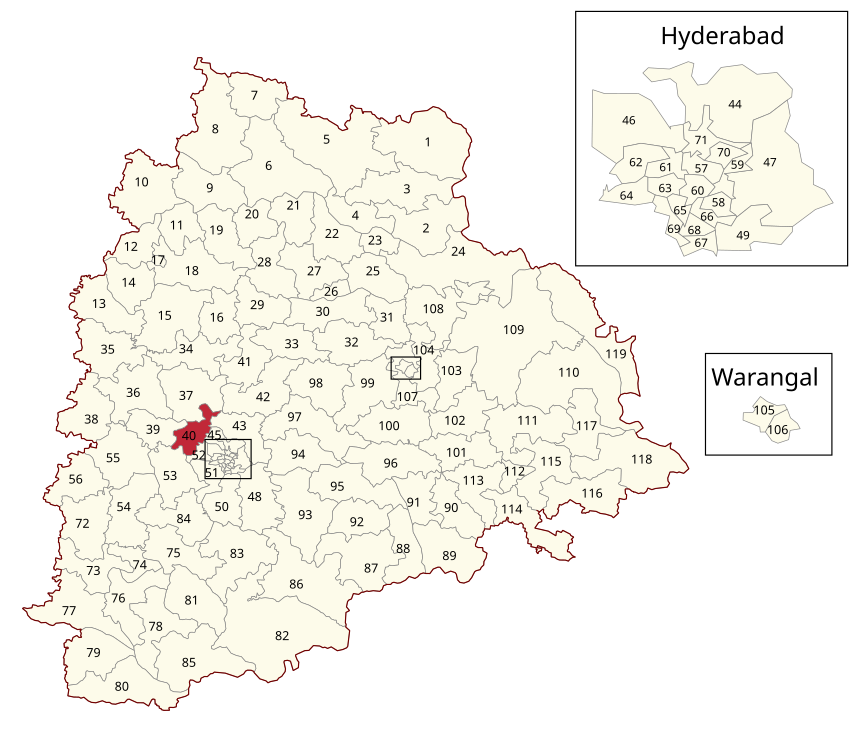
- Location of Patancheru Assembly constituency within Telangana

Constituency details
- Country: India
- Region: South India
- State: Telangana
- District: Sangareddy
- Lok Sabha constituency: Medak
- Established: 2008
- Total electors: 2,76,724
- Reservation: None

Member of Legislative Assembly
- 3rd Telangana Legislative Assembly
- Incumbent Gudem Mahipal Reddy
- Party: Bharat Rashtra Samithi
- Elected year: 2023

Patancheru Assembly constituency is a constituency of Telangana Legislative Assembly, India. It is one of five constituencies in Sangareddy district. It is part of Medak Lok Sabha constituency. It is also one of the 24 constituencies of GHMC.

Gudem Mahipal Reddy of Telangana Rashtra Samithi won the seat in 2023 Assembly Election for the third time.

== Mandals ==
The Assembly Constituency presently comprises the following Mandals:

Mandal
Patancheru
Ameenpur
Jinnaram
Gummadidala
Ramachandrapuram

== Members of Legislative Assembly ==
Duration	Member	Political party
Andhra Pradesh
2009	T. Nandeshwar Goud	Indian National Congress
Telangana
2014	Gudem Mahipal Reddy	Telangana Rashtra Samithi
2018	Gudem Mahipal Reddy	Telangana Rashtra Samithi
2023	Gudem Mahipal Reddy	Bharat Rashtra Samithi

== Election results ==
=== 2023 ===
2023 Telangana Legislative Assembly election: Patancheru
Party	Candidate	Votes	%	±%
BRS	G. Mahipal Reddy	105,387	38.06	
INC	Kata Srinivas Goud	98,296	35.50	
BSP	Neelam Madhu Mudhiraj	46,162	16.67	
Majority		7,091		
Turnout		2,77,618	69.87	
BRS hold		Swing		

=== 2018 ===
2018 Telangana Legislative Assembly election: Patancheru
Party	Candidate	Votes	%	±%
BRS	G. Mahipal Reddy	116,474	54.41	
INC	Kata Srinivas Goud	78,775	36.80	
BJP	P Karunakar Reddy	7,428	3.47	
NOTA	None of the Above	1,487	0.69%	
Majority		37,699		
Turnout		2,14,065	75.97	
BRS hold		Swing		

=== 2014 ===
2014 Telangana Legislative Assembly election: Patancheru
Party	Candidate	Votes	%	±%
BRS	G. Mahipal Reddy	73,986	37.06%	
TDP	M. Sapanadev	55,100	27.6%	
INC	T. Nandeshwar Goud	37,226	18.65%	
Independent	Chinnamail Anji Reddy	12,571	6.3%	
Majority		18,887		
Turnout		1,99,619	72.15%	
TRS gain from INC		Swing		

=== 2009 ===
2009 Andhra Pradesh Legislative Assembly election: Patancheru
Party	Candidate	Votes	%	±%
INC	T. Nandeshwar Goud	42,516	26.25%	
TDP	M.Sapanadev	41,269	25.48%	
PRP	J. Ramulu	21,403	13.21%	
BJP	Kurra Sathyanarayana	20,265	12.51%	
Majority		1247		
INC win (new seat)				

== See also ==
- List of constituencies of Telangana Legislative Assembly
