= Cheruku Mutyam Reddy =

Indian politician

Cheruku Mutyam Reddy (1945 – 2 September 2019) was an Indian politician from Andhra Pradesh. He was a member of the Andhra Pradesh Legislative Assembly from the Dubbaka Assembly constituency in Medak district representing the Telugu Desam Party. He won as an MLA in 1989, 1994, 1999 and 2009.

== Early life ==
Reddy was from Tukkapur village, Thoguta mandal, Siddipet district, Andhra Pradesh. He was the son of the late Bala Krishna Reddy. He had a daughter, Jyothi, who is settled in the United States of America. He studied till Class 12 at H.S.C. at Government. Multipurpose High School, Siddipet, and passed the examinations in 1962. He declared assets worth Rs.2 crore in 2009 in his affidavit to the Election Commission of India.

== Career ==
Reddy began his political career as a sarpanch of Tukkapur. He was first elected as an MLA from Dommata Assembly constituency in 1989 and retained the seat in 1994 on the Telugu Desam ticket. In 1989, he polled 33,056 votes on TDP ticket and defeated Rangareddy M of the Indian National Congress by 9,273 votes. In 1994, he garnered 59,037 votes and beat his closest opponent Ahmed Farook Hussain of the Indian National Congress by 38,782 votes. He won for the third consecutive time winning the 1999 Andhra Pradesh Legislative Assembly election, where he got 61,734 votes and overcame his nearest rival, Bandi Narsa Goud of the Congress by 31,485 votes.

Later, the seat which existed since 1952, again became Dubbak constituency. He won the Dubbaka Assembly constituency in the 2009 Andhra Pradesh Legislative Assembly election representing the Indian National Congress. He polled 52,989 votes and defeated his nearest rival, Solipeta Ramalinga Reddy of the Telangana Rashtra Samithi, by 2,640 votes. He lost to Ramalinga Reddy the next time in the 2014 Andhra Pradesh Legislative Assembly election where he garnered 44,306 votes and came second losing by 37,925 votes.

In 2018, when he was denied a ticket for the Assembly elections, he joined the Telangana Rashtra Samithi on the invitation of K Chandrashekar Rao. He also served as a minister. He also served as the chairman of the Tirumala Tirupati Devasthanam Trust board.

=== Death ===
Reddy died on 2 September 2019 at a private hospital in Hyderabad.
