= P. Hanmanth Rao =

Indian politician

Member of Parliament, Lok Sabha
- In office 1957-1967
- Preceded by: N. M. Jaisoorya
- Succeeded by: Sangam Laxmi Bai
- Constituency: Medak

Personal details
- Born: 17 September 1909
- Party: Indian National Congress
- Spouse: P. Saraswati Devi

P. Hanmanth Rao was an Indian politician. He was elected to the Lok Sabha, the lower house of the Parliament of India from Medak as a member of the Indian National Congress.
