= Golugonda =

- Village
- Interactive map of Golugonda
- Location in Andhra Pradesh, India
- Coordinates: 17.679312°N 82.467778°E
- Country: India
- State: Andhra Pradesh
- District: Anakapalli

Languages
  - Official: Telugu
- Time zone: UTC+5:30 (IST)
- Vehicle Registration: AP31 (Former); AP39 (from 30 January 2019)

Golugonda is a village and a Mandal in Anakapalli district in the state of Andhra Pradesh in India. This village is famous for availability of semi-precious stones. Special police squads have been formed to prevent illegal quarrying of semi-precious stones both here and in other mandals in the district.

== Assembly constituency ==
Golugonda was an assembly constituency in Andhra Pradesh.

- 1951 - Kankipati veeranna padal and Killada Ramamurthy
- 1955 - Ruthala Latchapatrudu
