= Kotha Prabhakar Reddy =

Indian politician

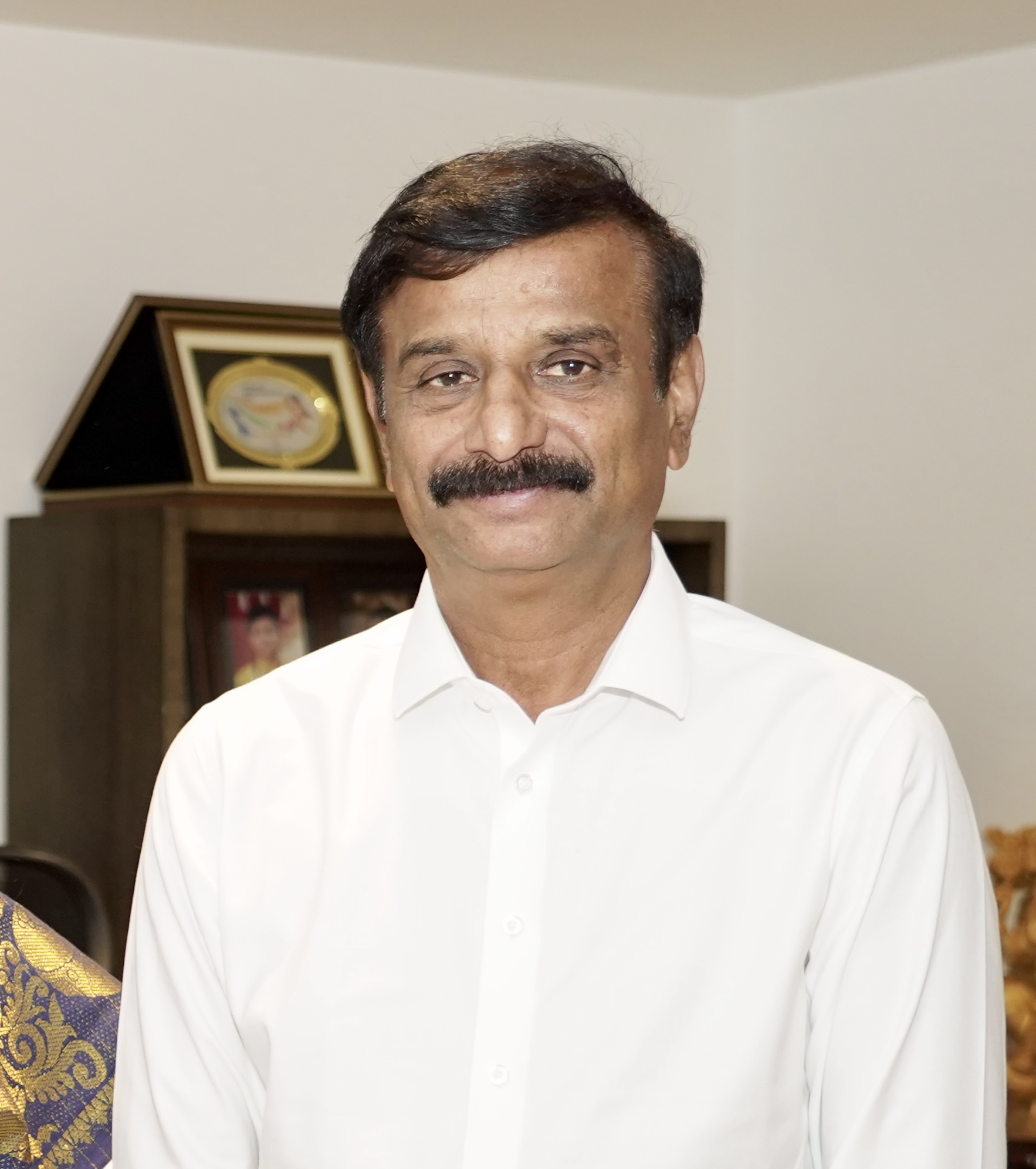

Member of Telangana Legislative Assembly
- Incumbent
- Assumed office 3 December 2023
- Preceded by: Raghunandan Rao
- Constituency: Dubbak Assembly constituency

Member of Parliament, Lok Sabha
- In office 25 November 2014 – 13 December 2023
- Preceded by: K. Chandrasekhar Rao
- Succeeded by: Raghunandan Rao
- Constituency: Medak (Lok Sabha constituency)

Personal details
- Born: 6 June 1966 (age 60) Potharam, Dubbak
- Party: Bharat Rashtra Samithi
- Spouse: Smt. Manjulatha
- Children: 2
- Occupation: Politician, businessperson
- As of 17 December, 2016

Kotha Prabhakar Reddy is an Indian politician who won a by-election held in 2014 for the Medak (Lok Sabha constituency) being Bharat Rashtra Samithi candidate. He won by a margin of 3,61,277 votes in the by-poll, which was a shock for the opposition who had expected the ruling TRS party to lose their seat after party head K. Chandrashekhar Rao had resigned from the seat after taking oath as the chief minister of the newly formed state Telangana.

Kotha Prabhakar Reddy was born to a Farmer and had a humble beginning.

On October 30, 2023, an unidentified person attacked Reddy with a knife in the stomach while posing as if to shake hands with him during a campaign in Siddipet district. He was promptly apprehended by fellow followers and is currently in police custody, undergoing interrogation.
