= Patancheru =

Patancheru Patancheruvu
- Hyderabad
- Location in Hyderabad, India Patancheru (India)
- Coordinates: 17.53°N 78.27°E
- Country: India
- State: Telangana
- District: Sangareddy
- City: Hyderabad
- Established: 1930 JAN 14

Government
  - Type: Greater Hyderabad Municipal Corporation
- Elevation: 522 m (1,713 ft)

Population (2011)
  - Hyderabad: 150,000
  - Metro: 275,000

Languages
  - Official: Telugu & English
- Time zone: UTC+5:30
- PIN: 502319
- Vehicle registration: TG-15
- MLA: Gudem Mahipal Reddy
- Lok Sabha constituency: Medak Lok Sabha constituency
- MedakVidhan Sabha constituency: Patancheru Assembly constituency
- Website: telangana.gov.in

Patancheru, also known as Patancheruvu, is located in the north western end of Hyderabad. It is an industrial zone located about 32 km from the city centre on the Hyderabad-Solapur highway, and around 18 km from HITEC City. Earlier, it was the headquarters of Bidar and Gulshanabad revenue divisions. It has a number of temples built between 12th and 15th centuries. Patancheru is home to ICRISAT, and many pharmaceutical manufacturers, which has resulted in the local river water being the most drug polluted water in the world.

== Geography ==
Patancheru is located at 17.53°N 78.27°E. It has an average elevation of 522 metres (1712 feet). Saki Lake is situated very close to the Patancheru Bus Terminus.

== Climate ==
Patancheru has been ranked 41st best “National Clean Air City” under (Category 2 3-10L Population cities) in India.

== Demographics ==
As of 2001 India census, Patancheru had a population of 40,332. Males constitute 53% of the population and females 47%. Patancheru has an average literacy rate of 65%, higher than the national average of 59.5%. Male literacy is 73%, and female literacy is 57%. In Patancheru, 14% of the population is under 6 years of age.

== Education ==
There are a number of educational institutions in Patancheru, including the following:

- ICRISAT
- GITAM University Hyderabad Campus (Rudraram village, Patancheru)
- TRR College of Engineering (INOLE, Patancheru)

== Theatres ==
There is one Theatre in Patancheru, including the following:

- Venkateswara Theatre

== Industry ==
Patancheru is the major industrial hub of Telangana. Companies such as Finecab, Biological.E, Ankit Packaging, Sandvik Asia, Agarwal Rubber Limited (makers of ARL & MARUTI brand of tyres & butyl tubes) and Asian Paints, Aurobindo Pharma, Paragon Polymer Products Pvt Ltd, hindware, Fenner, Pennar, Kirby Building Systems, Rotec Transmissions are located in this area. It received a major boost when Indira Gandhi started the Patancheru Industrial park, while serving as the MP of Medak constituency.

The highest level of drug pollution in water was found in Patancheru in 2009. Researchers found measurable quantities of 21 different manufactured drugs in the water. The pollution results from waste water dumped into the river by the over 90 local pharmaceutical manufacturers.

Political parties had promised that they were going to clean the lake in Patancheru as it was polluted with sewage and a mix of chemicals from the industries around it as the present and MLA and his TRS government had promised to make it drinkable.
