= Dubbak, Nizamabad =

Dubbak
- village
- Location in Telangana, India
- Coordinates: 18°38′03″N 78°22′41″E
- Country: India
- State: Telangana

Languages
  - Official: Telugu
- Time zone: UTC+5:30 (IST)
- PIN: 503165
- Telephone code: 08461
- Vehicle registration: AP-25
- Nearest city: Nizamabad
- Lok Sabha constituency: Nizamabad
- Avg. summer temperature: 45 °C (113 °F)
- Avg. winter temperature: 15 °C (59 °F)

Dubbak is a village in Nizamabad district, Telangana, India. The village is located 35 kilometers from Nizamabad. As of the 2011 Census of India, the village's population was 5,563, with 2,747 males and 2,816 females.
