= Dubbak Assembly constituency =

Constituency of the Telangana legislative assembly in India

Coordinates: 18.18°N 78.67°E

Dubbaka
- Constituency No. 41 for the Telangana Legislative Assembly
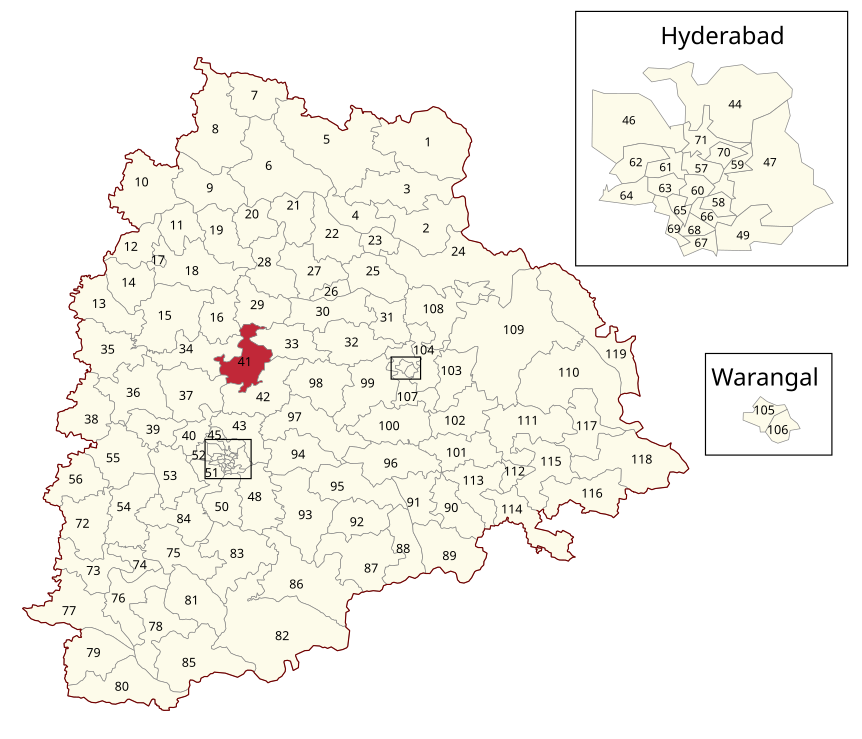
- Location of Dubbak Assembly constituency within Telangana

Constituency details
- Country: India
- Region: South India
- State: Telangana
- District: Siddipet
- Lok Sabha constituency: Medak
- Established: 2008
- Total electors: 1,82,825
- Reservation: None

Member of Legislative Assembly
- 3rd Telangana Legislative Assembly
- Incumbent Kotha Prabhakar Reddy
- Party: Bharat Rashtra Samiti
- Elected year: 2023

Dubbak Assembly constituency is a constituency of Telangana Legislative Assembly, India. It is one of ten constituencies in Medak district. It is part of Medak Lok Sabha constituency.

== Mandals ==
The Assembly Constituency presently comprises the following Mandals:

Mandal	Districts
Dubbaka	Siddipet
Akbarpet-Bhoompalle	Siddipet
Mirdoddi	Siddipet
Doultabad	Siddipet
Raipole	Siddipet
Thoguta	Siddipet
Narsingi	Medak
Chegunta	Medak
Masaipet	Medak

Some villages which are part of Masaipet mandal are present in Narsapur Assembly Constituency. Some villages which are part of Narsingi mandal are present in Medak Assembly Constituency

== Members of the Legislative Assembly ==
Year	Member	Political party
Andhra Pradesh
2009	Cheruku Mutyam Reddy	Indian National Congress
Telangana
2014	Solipeta Ramalinga Reddy	Telangana Rashtra Samithi
2018	Solipeta Ramalinga Reddy	Telangana Rashtra Samithi
2020	M. Raghunandan Rao	Bharatiya Janata Party
2023	Kotha Prabhakar Reddy	Bharat Rashtra Samithi

^by-election

== Election results ==
=== Assembly election, 2023 ===
2023 Telangana Legislative Assembly election: Dubbak
Party	Candidate	Votes	%	±%
BRS	Kotha Prabhakar Reddy	97,879	56.01	
BJP	M. Raghunandan Rao	44,366	25.39	
INC	Cheruku Srinivas Reddy	25,235	14.44	
NOTA	None of the Above	2,269	1.30	
Majority		53,513	30.62	
Turnout		1,74,834	88.23	
BRS gain from BJP		Swing		

=== 2020 by-election ===
By-elections, 2020: Dubbak
Party	Candidate	Votes	%	±%
BJP	M. Raghunandan Rao	63,352	38.47	+24.72
BRS	Solipeta Sujatha Reddy	62,273	37.82	−16.54
INC	Cheruku Srinivas Reddy	22,196	13.48	−2.86
NOTA	None of the above	554	0.34	
Majority		1,079	0.65	−38.03
Turnout		1,65,638	83.32	−2.91
BJP gain from BRS		Swing		

=== Telangana Legislative Assembly election, 2018 ===
2018 Telangana Legislative Assembly election: Dubbak
Party	Candidate	Votes	%	±%
BRS	Solipeta Ramalinga Reddy	89,299	54.36	+0.99
INC	Maddula Nageshwar Reddy	26,799	16.31	−12.44
BJP	M. Raghunandan Rao	22,595	13.75	+3.93
Majority		62,500	38.04	+13.43
Turnout		1,64,281	86.23	+3.43
BRS hold		Swing		

=== Telangana Legislative Assembly election, 2014 ===
2014 Telangana Legislative Assembly election: Dubbak
Party	Candidate	Votes	%	±%
BRS	Solipeta Ramalinga Reddy	82,234	53.37	+18.05
INC	Cheruku Mutyam Reddy	44,309	28.75	−8.43
BJP	M. Raghunandan Rao	15,131	9.82	+5.63
Majority		37,925	24.61	+22.75
Turnout		1,54,381	82.80	+4.09
BRS gain from INC		Swing		

=== Andhra Pradesh Legislative Assembly election, 2009 ===
2009 Andhra Pradesh Legislative Assembly election: Dubbak
Party	Candidate	Votes	%	±%
INC	Cheruku Mutyam Reddy	52,989	37.18	New
TRS	Solipeta Ramalinga Reddy	50,349	35.32	New
PRP	Maddula Nageshwar Reddy	19,971	14.01	New
BJP	Motadu Girish reddy	5,967	4.19	New
Majority		2,640	1.86	
Turnout		1,42,564	78.71	
INC win (new seat)				

== See also ==
- List of constituencies of Telangana Legislative Assembly
