= Gudem Mahipal Reddy =

Indian political activist (born 1963)

Member of Telangana Legislative Assembly
- Incumbent
- Assumed office 2 June 2014
- Preceded by: Telangana Legislative Assembly established
- Constituency: Patancheru (Assembly constituency)

Personal details
- Born: 19 September 1963 (age 63) Patancheru, Hyderabad, Telangana
- Party: Bharat Rashtra Samithi (2014-Present)
- Spouse: Gudem Yadhamma
- Children: 2 Sons 1 Daughter

Gudem Mahipal Reddy is an Indian political activist who is the current member of the Telangana Legislative Assembly from Patancheru constituency. He belongs to Bharat Rashtra Samithi. He won election in 2014 and 2018 and 2023 General Elections.
