= Sangam Laxmi Bai =

Indian politician

Sangam Laxmi Bai Yadav

Member of Parliament
- In office 1957 - 1972
- Constituency: Medak

Personal details
- Born: 27 July 1911 Ghatkesar, Hyderabad State
- Died: 1979 (aged 69)
- Party: Indian National Congress
- Spouse: Durga Prasad Yadav

Sangam Laxmi Bai B.A. (27 July 1911 – 1979) was an Indian social worker and Parliamentarian.

== Early life ==
Bai was born at Ghatkesar, Hyderabad State in 1911. Her father was D. Ramaiah. She was educated at Karve University, Sharda Niketan and College of Arts, Madras.

== Life ==
Bai worked as a full-time social and public worker. She entered politics by boycotting Simon Commission during her student life. She took active part in Salt Satyagraha and was imprisoned for one year, from 1930-31.

She was founder and honorary secretary of Indira Seva Sadan (Orphanage), Radhika Maternity Home, Vasu Shishu Vihar and Masetti Hanumanthu Gupta High School in Hyderabad.

She worked in charge of Acharya Vinoba Bhave's first Paidal Yatra and President of Hyderabad Yadava Mahajana Samaajam and Vice-President of the All India Students Conference, Hyderabad Food Council and Andhra Yuvti Mandali. Bai was also the treasurer of State Social Welfare Advisory Board of Andhra Pradesh and Convener of Women's Congress in Hyderabad Pradesh Congress Committee. She was member of Andhra Vidya Mahila Sangam for 18 years; executive of the Andhra Pradesh Congress Committee for a few years and in the All India Congress Committee.

== Political career ==
Bai was elected to the Hyderabad State Legislative Assembly in 1952 and held the position of Deputy Minister of Education in Government of Andhra Pradesh from February, 1954 to October, 1956. She was elected to the 2nd Lok Sabha in 1957, 3rd Lok Sabha in 1962 and for 4th Lok Sabha in 1967, as a member of Indian National Congress from Medak constituency.

== Personal life ==
She was married during her childhood to Durga Prasad Yadav, who was 18 years old. After some days he died. Her father was not interested her studying, even though she was a student and an activist and an active student.
