= Medak Lok Sabha constituency =

Lok sabha constituency in Telangana

Coordinates: 18.0°N 78.3°E

Medak TG-6
- Lok Sabha constituency
- Medak Lok Sabha constituency in Telangana

Constituency details
- Country: India
- Region: South India
- State: Telangana
- Assembly constituencies: Siddipet; Medak; Narsapur; Sangareddy; Patancheru; Dubbak; Gajwel
- Established: 1957
- Total electors: 1,536,715
- Reservation: None

Member of Parliament
- 18th Lok Sabha
- Incumbent Raghunandan Rao
- Party: BJP
- Elected year: 2024

Medak Lok Sabha constituency is one of the 543 Lok Sabha (Lower House of the Parliament) constituencies in Telangana state in southern India.

== Overview ==
Since its inception in 1957 Medak seat is a Congress stronghold, various political outfits like the Telangana Praja Samithi, Bharatiya Janata Party and the Telugu Desam Party have won it during different general elections.

After the formation of Telangana Rashtra Samithi the seat has been won by four different candidates in three general elections including its founder and former Chief Minister of Telangana K. Chandrashekar Rao and actress Vijayashanti

== Assembly segments ==
Medak Lok Sabha constituency comprises the following Legislative Assembly segments:

No	Name	District	Member	Party	Leading (in 2024)
33	Siddipet	Siddipet	T. Harish Rao	BRS	BRS
34	Medak	Medak	Mynampally Rohit	INC	BJP
37	Narsapur	Medak	Vakiti Sunitha Laxma Reddy	BRS	INC
39	Sangareddy	Sangareddy	Chinta Prabhakar	BRS	INC
40	Patancheru	Sangareddy	Gudem Mahipal Reddy	BRS	BJP
41	Dubbak	Siddipet	Kotha Prabhakar Reddy	BRS	BRS
42	Gajwel	Siddipet	K. Chandrashekar Rao	BRS	BRS

== Members of Parliament ==
Year	Member	Party
1952	N. M. Jaisoorya	People's Democratic Front (Hyderabad)
1957	P. Hanmanth Rao	Indian National Congress
1962	P. Hanmanth Rao	Indian National Congress
1967	Sangam Laxmi Bai	Indian National Congress
1971	Mallikarjun Goud	Telangana Praja Samithi
1977	Mallikarjun Goud	Indian National Congress
1980	Indira Gandhi †	Indian National Congress
1984	P. Manik Reddy	Telugu Desam Party
1989	M. Baga Reddy	Indian National Congress
1991	M. Baga Reddy	Indian National Congress
1996	M. Baga Reddy	Indian National Congress
1998	M. Baga Reddy	Indian National Congress
1999	A. Narendra	Bharatiya Janata Party
2004	A. Narendra	Telangana Rashtra Samithi
2009	Vijaya Shanthi	Telangana Rashtra Samithi
2014	K. Chandrashekar Rao	Telangana Rashtra Samithi
2014^	Kotha Prabhakar Reddy	Telangana Rashtra Samithi
2019	Kotha Prabhakar Reddy	Telangana Rashtra Samithi
2024	Raghunandan Rao	Bharatiya Janata Party

^By-Poll

== Election results ==
Vote share of Winning candidates
2024	33.99%
2019	51.82%
2014 (By-Poll)	55.24%
2014	55.20%
2009	36.67%
2004	50.36%
1999	48.20%
1998	34.12%
1996	37.42%
1991	50.67%
1989	54.42%
1984	48.21%
1980	67.93%
1977	67.00%
1971	58.62%
1967	45.12%
1962	45.21%
1957	56.32%
1952	45.72%

=== 2024 ===
2024 Indian general election: Medak
Party	Candidate	Votes	%	±%
BJP	Raghunandan Rao	471,217	33.99	▲16.47
INC	Neelam Madhu	432,078	31.17	▲6.86
BRS	P. Venkatrama Reddy	396,790	28.62	▼23.20
BSP	Bodakunti Eshwar	7,214	0.54	
NOTA	None of the Above	4,617	0.33	▼1.01
Majority		39,139	2.82	▼24.69
Turnout		1,386,239	75.09	▲3.34
BJP gain from TRS		Swing		

=== 2019 ===
2019 Indian general election: Medak
Party	Candidate	Votes	%	±%
TRS	Kotha Prabhakar Reddy	596,048	51.82	▼3.42
INC	Anil Kumar Gali	279,621	24.31	▲3.97
BJP	Raghunandan Rao	201,567	17.52	▼0.48
NOTA	None of the Above	15,390	1.34	
Majority		316,427	27.51	▼7.03
Turnout		1,150,331	71.75	▲3.96
TRS hold		Swing		

=== 2014 by-election ===
By-Election, 2014: Medak
Party	Candidate	Votes	%	±%
TRS	Kotha Prabhakar Reddy	571,810	55.24	▲0.04
INC	Vakiti Sunitha Laxma Reddy	2,10,524	20.34	▼1.53
BJP	Jagga Reddy	1,86,343	18.00	▲2.74
Majority		3,61,286	34.54	▲1.21
Turnout		10,46,114	67.79	
TRS hold		Swing		

=== 2014 ===
2014 Indian general election: Medak
Party	Candidate	Votes	%	±%
TRS	K. Chandrashekar Rao	657,492	55.20	▲18.53
INC	P. Shravan Kumar Reddy	260,463	21.87	▼14.23
BJP	Chaganla Narendra Nath	181,804	15.26	▲8.75
IND	Kundeti Ravi	33,507	2.81	
YSRCP	Prabhugoud Pullaiahgari	11,752	0.99	
NOTA	None of the Above	10,696	0.90	
Majority		397,029	33.33	▲32.76
Turnout		1,293,548	77.70	▲1.41
TRS hold		Swing		

=== 2009 ===
2009 Indian general election: Medak
Party	Candidate	Votes	%	±%
TRS	Vijaya Shanthi	388,839	36.67	▼13.69
INC	C. Narendranath	382,762	36.10	
PRP	Khaja Quayum Anwar	120,812	11.39	
BJP	P. Niroop Reddy	69,027	6.51	▼30.11
IND	Kundeti Ravi	38,714	3.65	
OTH	3 Other Party Candidates	38,021	3.59	
Majority		6,077	0.57	▼13.17
Turnout		1,060,272	76.29	
TRS hold		Swing		

=== 2004 ===
2004 Indian general election: Medak
Party	Candidate	Votes	%	±%
TRS	Ale Narendra	453,738	50.36	
BJP	P. Ramachandra Reddy	329,972	36.62	▼11.58
BSP	Nalla Suryaprakash	52,273	5.80	
IND	Md. Ulfathali	34,476	3.83	
IND	K. Laxmaiah Yadav	18,457	2.05	
IND	P. Jeevula Naik	12,099	1.34	
Majority		123,766	13.74	▲11.08
Turnout		901,015		
TRS gain from BJP		Swing		

=== 1999 ===
1999 Indian general election: Medak
Party	Candidate	Votes	%	±%
BJP	Ale Narendra	400,244	48.20	▲16.17
INC	M. Baga Reddy	378,161	45.54	▲11.42
IND	Syed Muneeroddin	14,505	1.75	
IND	Golla Vittal	11,525	1.39	
MCPI(S)	Allaram Ratnaiah	10,483	1.26	
AJBP	Tirunagari Muralidhar	8,248	0.99	
IND	Ganta Babu	7,214	0.87	
Majority		22,083	2.66	▲0.57
Turnout		868,547	71.19	▲5.41
BJP gain from INC		Swing		

=== 1998 ===
1998 Indian general election: Medak
Party	Candidate	Votes	%	±%
INC	M. Baga Reddy	269,122	34.12	▼3.30
BJP	Ale Narendra	252,642	32.03	▲12.15
TDP	Patlolla Manik Reddy	240,166	30.44	▼3.39
SP	Gurujada Beeraiah Yadav	12,465	1.58	
BSP	Mohd. Waheed Ahmed	8,634	1.09	
IND	Ganta Babu	2,066	0.26	
JTP	C. Manik Rao	1,907	0.24	
IND	C. Bhagya Rekha	1,536	0.19	
IND	L. Muralidhar	324	0.04	
Majority		16,480	2.09	▼1.50
Turnout		803,484	65.78	▲1.66
INC hold		Swing		

=== 1996 ===
1996 Indian general election: Medak
Party	Candidate	Votes	%	±%
INC	M. Baaga Reddy	286,278	37.42	▼13.25
TDP	Patlolla Manik Reddy	258,789	33.83	▲5.79
BJP	Ale Narendra	152,070	19.88	▲4.09
NTDP	G. Laxmi Narsinga Rao	30,374	3.97	
AIIC(T)	Mohammaid Ibrahim	1,261	0.16	
IND	14 Independent Candidates	36,221	4.74	
Majority		27,489	3.59	▼19.04
Turnout		787,529	64.12	▲3.87
INC hold		Swing		

=== 1991 ===
1991 Indian general election: Medak
Party	Candidate	Votes	%	±%
INC	N. Baga Reddy	313,740	50.67	▼3.75
TDP	D. Rama Krishna	173,590	28.04	▼12.75
BJP	Allani Kishan Rao	97,791	15.79	
BSP	Nalla Suryaprakash	17,743	2.87	
IND	Ganta Babu	4,417	0.71	
IND	N. Vittalaiah	3,651	0.59	
JP	M. N. Rahman	2,644	0.43	▼0.26
IND	S. Sri Nivasa Reddy	2,317	0.37	
IND	Soma Devaiah	1,298	0.21	
IND	Gabbula Nagender	1,157	0.19	
IND	Suthari Radha Krishna	808	0.13	
Majority		140,150	22.63	▲9.00
Turnout		637,896	60.25	▼9.44
INC hold		Swing		

=== 1989 ===
1989 Indian general election: Medak
Party	Candidate	Votes	%	±%
INC	M. Bagareddy	383,586	54.42	▲6.55
TDP	P. Manik Reddy	287,490	40.79	▼7.42
IND	Naikwadi Vittalaiah	12,904	1.83	
IND	Errolla Rathnaiah	7,797	1.11	
IND	B. Venketeshwara Rao	4,976	0.71	
JP	K. Rama Goud	4,838	0.69	
IND	P. Laxmaiah	1,845	0.26	
IND	B. N. Sharma	1,439	0.20	
Majority		96,096	13.63	▲13.29
Turnout		736,786	69.69	▲2.08
INC gain from TDP		Swing		

=== 1984 ===
1984 Indian general election: Medak
Party	Candidate	Votes	%	±%
TDP	P. Manik Reddy	263,524	48.21	
INC	P. Shiv Shanker	261,708	47.87	▼20.06
IND	Ganta Babu	6,407	1.17	
IND	B. Venkateshwara Rao	6,093	1.11	
IND	Patloolla Venkatram Reddy	5,058	0.93	
IND	M. G. Gopal Reddy	3,864	0.71	
Majority		1,816	0.34	▼49.02
Turnout		561,154	67.61	▲4.40
TDP gain from INC(I)		Swing		

=== 1980 ===
1980 Indian general election: Medak
Party	Candidate	Votes	%	±%
INC(I)	Indira Gandhi	301,577	67.93	▲0.93
JP	S. Jaipal Reddy	82,453	18.57	▼8.34
JP(S)	Kesava Rao Jadav	26,149	5.89	
IND	Ganta Babu	15,456	3.48	
IND	Sakuntala Devi	6,514	1.47	
IND	K. Venkatsam	4,970	1.12	
IND	P. V. Rajeswar Rao	2,441	0.55	
IND	M. Lakshmi Narayana Rao	1,704	0.38	
IND	Sardar Jagat Singh	1,430	0.32	
IND	Baswant Reddy Bagali	1,240	0.28	
Majority		219,124	49.36	▲9.27
Turnout		458,263	63.21	▲4.80
INC(I) gain from INC		Swing		

=== 1977 ===
1977 Indian general election: Medak
Party	Candidate	Votes	%	±%
INC	Mallikarjun	239,813	67.00	▲28.86
JP	Narasimba Reddy	96,303	26.91	
IND	Shankeraiah	11,630	3.25	
IND	Radhey Shyam	5,532	1.55	
IND	Mirza Jamil Ahmed Baig	4,006	1.12	
IND	Siripuram Lakshmikantha Rao	637	0.18	
Majority		143,510	40.09	▲19.61
Turnout		371,104	58.41	▲8.22
INC gain from TPS		Swing		

=== 1971 ===
1971 Indian general election: Medak
Party	Candidate	Votes	%	±%
TPS	Mallikarjun	152,975	58.62	
INC	Narsimha Reddy	99,544	38.14	▼6.98
IND	Lingaiah Katipally	8,455	3.24	
Majority		53,431	20.48	▼9.38
Turnout		269,393	50.19	▼9.24
TPS gain from INC		Swing		

=== 1967 ===
1967 Indian general election: Medak
Party	Candidate	Votes	%	±%
INC	S. L. Bai	127,917	45.12	▼0.09
IND	K. Ramiah	43,252	15.26	
IND	J. Shankeriah	42,985	15.16	
SWA	C. P. Lingam	31,124	10.98	▼8.42
IND	R. R. Vaidya	19,016	6.71	
SSP	M. J. Reddy	14,843	5.24	
IND	M. V. Choudary	4,368	1.54	
Majority		84,665	29.86	▲20.04
Turnout		296,187	59.43	▲10.63
INC hold		Swing		

=== 1962 ===
1962 Indian general election: Medak
Party	Candidate	Votes	%	±%
INC	P. Hanumantha Rao	88,098	45.21	▼11.11
IND	Molgu Jagannath Reddy	68,966	35.39	
SWA	L. Narahari Goud	37,806	19.40	
Majority		19,132	9.82	▼2.82
Turnout		202,286	48.80	▼1.14
INC hold		Swing		

=== 1957 ===
1957 Indian general election: Medak
Party	Candidate	Votes	%	±%
INC	P. Hanmanth Rao	106,511	56.32	▲20.55
PDF	Maqdum Mohiuddin	82,610	43.68	▼2.04
Majority		23,901	12.64	▲2.69
Turnout		189,121	49.94	▼4.91
INC gain from PDF		Swing		

=== 1952 ===
1952 Indian general election: Medak
Party	Candidate	Votes	%	±%
PDF	Jaisoorya	90,366	45.72	
INC	Srinivas Rao	70,686	35.77	
IND	Bal Reddy	36,585	18.51	
Majority		19,680	9.95	
Turnout		197,637	54.85	
PDF win (new seat)				

== Trivia ==
- Former Prime Minister Indira Gandhi was holding the seat when she was assassinated in 1984.
- Telangana first Chief Minister, Kalvakuntla Chandrashekar Rao won the seat by a margin of 3.7 lakh votes in 2014 General Election, but he later vacated it.

== See also ==
- Medak district
- List of constituencies of the Lok Sabha

Lok Sabha
Preceded by Baghpat	Constituency represented by the prime minister 1980-1984	Succeeded by Amethi
