= List of villages in Nalgonda district =

This is a list of villages in Nalgonda district, Telangana state, India, organized alphabetically.

== A–B ==
- Ailapuram
- Aitipamula
- Akaram
- Anajipuram
- Anantharam
- Annareddy Guda
- Anneparthy
- Appajipeta
- Arjalabai
- B.Thurka Palle
- Bandasomaram
- Battugudem
- Bollepally
- Bottuguda
- Brahmanapally
- Buddaram

== C–E ==
- Chada
- Chakirala
- Chamapur
- Chandampally
- Chandupatla, Bhongir mandal
- Chandupatla, Nakrekal Mandal
- Chappidolla Gudem
- Cheemalakondur
- Chinna Kaparthy
- Chinnaravula Pally
- Chintapally
- Chityal
- Dandampally
- Devalamma Naagaram
- Donakal
- Duppelli
- Eklaskhanpet
- Ellagiri
- Ellambhavi

== G–I ==
- Gangasanipally
- Ganugabanda
- Garakunta palem
- Gollagudem
- Gorenkalapally
- Gudur
- Gundrampally
- Gurraladandi
- Gurrampode
- Haliya
- Hanumapur
- Inupamula
- Itukulapahad

== J–L ==
- Jaikesaram
- Jainepally
- Jameela Pet
- Jamepally
- Jangaon
- K. R. Puram
- Kadaparthy
- Kadirenigudem
- Kaisaram
- Kaithapuram
- Kapugallu
- Katepally
- Kattangur
- Keethavarigudem
- Kepal
- Kerchipally
- Keshavapuram
- Kethepally
- Khapuraipally
- Kokkireni
- Kondamadugu
- Kondapur
- Kondoor
- Kondrapole
- Kotamarthy
- Koyalagudem
- Lingojigudem

== M ==
- M.Turkapally
- Madgulapally
- Mall
- Mamidala
- Mandalapuram
- Mandholla Gudem
- Mangalpally
- Mannevaripampu
- Marriguda
- Marrigudem
- Marror
- Masidugudem
- Midhatana Palli
- Moripirala
- Mugdumpally
- Muthyalapally
- Mylaram
- Mushampally

== N–O ==
- Nagireddypally
- Nampally
- Nancharipet
- Nandanam
- Nandapuram
- Narketpally
- Neernemula
- Nellibanda
- Nemergomula
- Nomula
- Ogode
- Ogulapur

== P–R ==
- Pacharlabodu Thanda
- Pagidipalli
- Palem
- Pallegudem
- Panagal
- Panthangi
- Pedda Adiserla Pally
- Peddagummadam
- Peddavoora
- Peepalpahad
- Penchikalpahad
- Perur
- Pittampally
- Pothireddypally
- Pulicherla
- Pulipalupula
- Pullaigudem
- Raghunathapuram
- Rahimkhanpet
- Raipally
- Ramapuram
- Rangapur
- Rathipally
- Ratnavaram
- Ravipadu
- Reddibavi
- Reddinaikthanda
- Rudravelly

== S–T ==
- Saidabad
- Samalonibavi
- Sarvepally
- Shaligowraram
- Siripuram
- Solipur
- Sreerangapuram
- Sri Rangapuram
- Suraram
- Surepally
- Swamulavaari Lingotam
- T Repaka
- Tangadapalli
- Tatikal
- Tellabally
- Thallavellamla
- Theratpally
- Thimmapur
- Thipparthy
- Thukkapur
- Thumbavi
- Thungapahad
- Toopranpet
- Tripuraram

== U–Y ==
- Uppalaphad
- Uthatoor
- Vailasingaram
- Valigonda
- Vallabhapuram
- Veeravelly
- Veliminedu
- Velmakanne
- Venkepally
- Venkiryal
- Venugopalpuram
- Vookondi
- Yadavally
