= Kondapur (disambiguation) =

Kondapur is a suburb of Hyderabad, Telangana, India

Kondapur or Kondapoor (Telugu: konda = hill, pur = settlement) may also refer to:

- Kondapur, Ghatkesar, a village in Ghatkesar mandal, Ranga Reddy district, Telangana, India
- Kondapur, Medak, a mandal in Medak district, Telangana, India
- Kondapur, Nalgonda, a village in Nalgonda district, Telangana, India
- Kondapur, Mancherial, a village in Mancherial district, Telangana, India
