= Reddibavi =

- Village
- Location in Telangana, India Reddibavi (India)
- Coordinates: 17°14′7.3818″N 78°58′24.4776″E
- Country: India
- State: Telangana

Population (2013)
  - Total: 450

Languages
  - Official: Telugu
- Time zone: UTC+5:30 (IST)

Reddibavi is a village in Nalgonda district in Telangana, India. It falls under Choutuppal mandal. Reddibavi is part of the Gundlabavi Gram panchayat. This is one of the four major villages which are part of this Gram panchayat. The other three villages are Thumbavi, Saidabad and Gundlabavi. Majority of the population in this village follows hinduism. Gowds are the dominant community of this village. This village played an historic role in Telangana Rebellion and many of the socialist movements in the region.

== Administration ==
Reddibavi was part of princely state of Hyderabad until 17 September 1948. Hyderabad state was formed after the intervention of Indian government and the relentless fight by the people of Telangana during Telangana Rebellion. Later Hyderabad State was merged with Andhra State on 1 November 1956 to form the state of Andhra Pradesh.

Reddibavi village is part of Gundlabavi Gram panchayat. It has a local self-governing body which contains 10 ward members and Sarpanch. This village is part of Aaregudem MPTC (Mandal Parishad Territorial Constituency). Reddibavi is part of Munugode (Assembly constituency)

== Political ==
Reddibavi has been the epicenter of politics and socialist movement in the region. A famous Communist Party of India (Marxist) leader Kandala Ranga Reddy hails from this village. Since the inception of this gram panchayat CPI(M) is playing an remarkable role in the development in the region.
