= Mangalpally =

Mangalpally may refer to:

- Mangalpally, Nalgonda, in Andhra Pradesh, India
- Mangalpally, Ranga Reddy, in Andhra Pradesh, India
