= Kurella =

- Village
- Location in Telangana
- Coordinates: 17°25′40″N 79°11′19″E
- Country: India
- State: Telangana
- District: Yadadri
- Time zone: UTC+5:30 (Indian Standard Time)
- ISO 3166 code: IN-AP

Kurella is a village in Yadadri district in Telangana, India. It is within the mandal of Atmakur.
