= Nomula =

Nomula may refer to places in India:

- Nomula, Nalgonda, in Andhra Pradesh state
- Nomula, Ranga Reddy, in Andhra Pradesh state
