= Neernemula =

Village in Telangana, India

Coordinates: 17°19′02″N 79°05′36″E

Neernemula is a medium size village located in Ramannapeta Mandal, Nalgonda district, Telangana, India. It has an average elevation of 322 meters above sea level. It is 36 km from the district headquarters in(Nalgonda) and 80 km from Hyderabad, the Telangana State capital. It is connected by tar road from Ramannapeta. The village is surrounded by Dubbaka to the east, Nidhanpally to the west, Bogaram to the southwest, Ramannapeta to the south, and Shobhanadripuram and Lakshmapuram to the north. The nearest town to Neernemula village is Ramannapeta, about 3 km to the south.

According to Census-2011 information the location code or village code of Neernemula village is 576849. The Neernemula village has population of 1810, of which 910 are males while 900 are females as per the population census of 2011. There are a total of 420 families residing in Neernemula village. The population of children age 0-6 is 170 which makes up 9.39% of total population of village. The average sex ratio of Neernemula village is 989. Child Sex Ratio for the Neernemula as per census is 828. In 2011, the literacy rate of Neernemula village was 67%. In Neernemula, the male literacy stands at 77% while the female literacy rate was 58%. The village people speak Telugu and Urdu.

Neernemula has temple dedicated to Shiva and Hanuman, located at the centre of the village. The idol of "shivalingam" was found in the digging of the village pond. The pond is mostly filled with water throughout the year and it is famous for fish, which is one of the sources of income to the village Panchayat.

The village is administrated by a Sarpanch (head of village), who is an elected representative.

Major cultivation is paddy. Most of the people depend on agriculture for their livelihood. For children to have education up to seventh class there is a School.
