= Raghavapur, Nalgonda district =

Coordinates: 11°54′N 76°40′E

Raghavapur
- Village
- Location in Telangana, India
- Country: India
- State: Telangana

Languages
  - Official: Telugu
- Time zone: UTC+5:30 (IST)
- Vehicle registration: AP

Raghavapur is a village in Nalgonda district in Telangana, India. It falls under Bibinagar mandal.
