= Pulicherla =

Pulicherla may refer to:

- Pulicherla mandal, Chittoor district, Andhra Pradesh, India
- Pulicherla, Nalgonda district, Telangana, India
