= Mylaram =

Village in Telangana, India

Mylaram is a village in Bommala Ramaram Mandal in Nalgonda District of Telangana State, India. It is located 93 km towards north from district headquarters in Nalgonda.

== Demographics ==
Telugu is the local language. The total population of Mylaram is 1609: males are 814 and females are 795 living in 355 houses. Total area of Mylaram is 848 hectares. Banda Venkatesam was Sarpanch of Mylaram(2013)

Vadlakonda Aruna anandchary is newly elected sarpanch 2019

== Transportation ==
=== By road ===
Bhongir is the nearest town to Mylaram. Bhongir is 15 km from Mylaram. The road connects Bhongir and Mylaram. It is 8 km from Anantharam (on Hyderabad to the Warangal highway). The best road connection to Mylaram is from Kondamadugu junction. It is 14 km from Konda Madugu Junction.

=== By rail ===
Bibinagar is the main railway station near to Mylaram.

== Post Office ==
Mylaram Pin code is 508126 and postal head office is Bibinagar.

== Commerce ==
There are many poultry farms and mango plantations.
