= Pallerla =

- Village
- Location in Telangana, India
- Coordinates: 17°25′00″N 79°08′50″E
- Country: India
- State: Telangana

Government
  - Type: Local self government(Panchayati Raj)
  - Sarpanch: Sri.N.Narasimha Reddy

Population (2001)
  - Total: 3,500
  - Density: 25/km^{2} (65/sq mi)

Languages
  - Official: Telugu
- Time zone: UTC+5:30 (IST)
- PIN: 508111
- Telephone code: 1500
- Vehicle registration: 50
- Sex ratio: 1000:980 ♂/♀

Pallerla is a village in Yadadri district in Telangana, India. It falls under Atmakur mandal.
