= Chada =

Chada may refer to:

- Chada, Nalgonda, a village in Telangana, India
- Chada and mongkut, crown-like traditional Thai headdresses
- Chada, a character in the anime series NieA 7

== See also ==
- Chadha
- Chad (name)
- Chad (disambiguation)
