= Perur (disambiguation) =

Perur is a neighbourhood located on western side of Coimbatore in the Indian state of Tamil Nadu.

Perur may also refer to:

- Perur Pateeswarar Temple
- Perur Santhalinga Swamigal
- Perur Chettipalayam
- Perur (state assembly constituency)
- Perur, Nalgonda district
