= Samalonibavi =

Samalonibavi chamalonibavi
- village
- Country: India
- State: Telangana
- District: Nalgonda

Languages
  - Official: Telugu
- Time zone: UTC+5:30 (IST)
- PIN: 508255

Samalonibavi is a village in Gurrampode mandal in Nalgonda district, in the state of Telangana, India. Prior to the Telangana split, it was in the state of Andhra Pradesh. It is 30 km far from Nalgonda. The population is approximately 200 families living within an overall population of 2500, mostly working in the farming sector.
