= Nampally =

Nampalli or Nampally (Telugu: నాంపల్లి) may refer to:

- Nampally, Hyderabad
- Nampally, Nalgonda
- Hyderabad Deccan (Railway station), popularly known as Nampally Railway Station.
