= Lingarajpally =

- Village
- Country: India
- State: Telangana

Languages
  - Official: Telugu
- Time zone: UTC+5:30 (IST)
- Postal code: 508112
- Vehicle registration: TG-30 (previously TS-30(2017-2024), TS-05(2014-2017) and AP-24(Before 2014)

Lingarajpally is a village in Atmakur Mandal of Yadadri Bhuvanagiri district in the Indian state of Telangana. It is located approximately 35km from Bhuvanagiri district headquarters.
