= Thalla Vellamla =

- Village
- Location in Telangana, India
- Coordinates: 18.427761°N 79.605873°E
- Country: India
- State: Telangana
- District: Nalgonda
- Talukas: Chityal (Nalgonda)

Population (2001)
  - Total: 1,082

Languages
  - Official: Telugu
- Time zone: UTC+5:30 (IST)
- PIN: 508244
- Telephone code: 91 08682

Thalla Vellamla is a village Panchayat in Chityal mandal in Nalgonda district in the state of Telangana in India.
