= Surepally =

- village
- Location in Telangana, India Surepally (India)
- Coordinates: 17.3827458°N 78.9084569°E
- Country: India
- State: Telangana
- District: Nalgonda
- Elevation: 455 m (1,493 ft)

Languages
  - Official: Telugu
- Time zone: UTC+5:30 (IST)
- PIN: 508116
- Telephone code: 08720
- Vehicle registration: TS
- Nearest city: Hyderabad
- Vidhan Sabha constituency: Bhongiri
- Lok Sabha constituency: Bhongiri
- Website: telangana.gov.in

Surepally is a village in Nalgonda district of Telangana, India. It falls under Bhongir mandal. It has an elevation of about 455 metres
