= Bandasomaram =

- village
- Location in Telangana, India Bandasomaram (India)
- Coordinates: 17.4902444°N 78.9839692°E
- Country: India
- State: Telangana
- District: Nalgonda

Languages
  - Official: Telugu
- Time zone: UTC+5:30 (IST)
- PIN: 508116
- Telephone code: 08685
- Vehicle registration: TS
- Nearest city: Hyderabad
- Lok Sabha constituency: Bhongiri
- Vidhan Sabha constituency: Bhongiri
- Website: telangana.gov.in

Bandasomaram is a village in Nalgonda district of Telangana, India. It falls under Bhongir mandal.
