= Ravipadu, Bibinagar mandal =

Ravipadu
- Village
- Country: India
- State: Andhra Pradesh

Languages
  - Official: Telugu
- Time zone: UTC+5:30 (IST)
- Vehicle registration: AP

Ravipadu is a village in Nalgonda district formerly in Andhra Pradesh but since 2014 in Telangana, India. It falls under Bibinagar mandal.
