= Brahmanapally, Nalgonda district =

Brahmanapally
- Village
- Country: India
- State: Telangana

Languages
  - Official: Telugu
- Time zone: UTC+5:30 (IST)

Brahmanapally is a village in Yadadri district in Telangana, India. It falls under Bibinagar mandal. This village is located on the road connecting Bibinagar and Nagireddy Pally. Hindustan Sanitary ware Ltd industry is located in this village.
