= Garakunta palem =

Garakunta palem is a village in Madugula pally of Nalgonda district in Telangana state, India. It is one of the seven villages under the Kannekal Gramapanchayat, with the other six being Kannekal, Narayana Puram, Peddapadu(Keshava Puram), Dharma Puram, Gopala Puram and Devuni Gopala Puram.

As part of the Telangana government's plan of creating new districts and reorganising the mandals by their geographical location, the kannekal gramapanchayat is proposed to be included in the newly created Madugulapalli Mandal.
