= Thukkapur =

- Village
- Country: India
- State: Telangana

Languages
  - Official: Telugu
- Time zone: UTC+5:30 (IST)

Thukkapur is a village in Nalgonda district in Telangana, India. It falls under Atmakur mandal. It is located 5 km from the sub-district headquarters, Bhongir (tehsildar office), and 70 km from the district headquarters, Nalgonda.

== Demographics ==
The total geographical area of the village is 879 hectares. According to 2009 statistics, Thukkapur serves as the gram panchayat for the village of Tukkapur. The population of Thukkapur village is recorded as 1413, comprising 734 males and 679 females, according to the Population Census of 2011.
