= Peepalpahad =

Peepalpahad is a village of Choutuppal mandal in the Nalgonda district in Telangana, India. This village is known for its agriculture products and famous Ranganayakulu Swamy temple. It is 50 km away from Hyderabad, the capital of Telangana, 5 km inside National Highway 65 (Old NH 9) from Koyyalagudem. Transportation facilities available from Hyderabad to Peepalpahad are only through road ways. The nearest town to this village is its Mandal, Choutuppal, which is just 9 km far. This village falls under Munugodu assembly constituency and Bhongir parliament constituency. The ancient place of Rachakonda hills are very near to this village which is about 10 km.
