= Gundrampally =

- Village
- Country: India
- State: Telangana

Languages
  - Official: Telugu
- Time zone: UTC+5:30 (IST)
- Vehicle registration: TS
- Website: telangana.gov.in

Gundrampally or Gundrampalli is a village in Nalgonda district in Telangana, India. It falls under Chityala mandal.

In 1948, Gundrampally was the site of a major revolt by the villagers against the Nizam of Hyderabad's rule and the widespread massacres of villagers by Razakars of Hyderabad who killed more than 350 villagers. There was a large Razakar camp at Gundrampally from where they had killed a large number of villagers. In retaliation, the camp was attacked and destroyed. In 1993, the villagers built a memorial Stupa to commemorate the martyrs.
