= Pullaigudem, Nalgonda district =

Coordinates: 17°26′N 79°12′E

Pullaigudem
- Village
- Location in Telangana, India
- Country: India
- State: Telangana

Languages
  - Official: Telugu
- Time zone: UTC+5:30 (IST)

Pullaigudem is a village in Nalgonda district in Telangana, India. It falls under Atmakur mandal.
