= Muthyalapally =

- village
- Location in Telangana, India Muthyalapally (India)
- Coordinates: 17.5097006°N 79.0317294°E
- Country: India
- State: Telangana
- District: Nalgonda

Government
  - Type: Panchayati raj (India)
  - Body: Gram panchayat

Languages
  - Official: Telugu
- Time zone: UTC+5:30 (IST)
- Telephone code: 08720
- Vehicle registration: TS
- Nearest city: Hyderabad
- Lok Sabha constituency: Bhongiri
- Vidhan Sabha constituency: Bhongiri
- Website: telangana.gov.in

Muthyalapally is a village in Nalgonda district of Telangana, India. It falls under Bhongir mandal.
