= Sarvepally, Nalgonda district =

Sarvepally
- Village
- Location within Telangana Location within India
- Coordinates: 17°27′38″N 79°06′08″E
- Country: India
- State: Telangana

Languages
  - Official: Telugu
- Time zone: UTC+5:30 (IST)

Sarvepally is a village in Nalgonda district in Telangana, India. It falls under Atmakur mandal.
