= Kepal =

- Village
- Country: India
- State: Telangana

Languages
  - Official: Telugu
- Time zone: UTC+5:30 (IST)

Kepal is hamlet under Kondamadugu village in Nalgonda district in Telangana, India. It is located on National Highway 202. It is popular for its traditional medicine for bone fractures.
