= Marrigudem =

Marriguda Marriguda
- Mandal
- Location in Telangana, India Marriguda (India)
- Coordinates: 17.090167°N 79.246662°E
- Country: India
- State: Telangana
- Region: Telangana
- District: Nalgonda
- Elevation: 421 m (1,381 ft)

Population (2011)
  - Total: 4,000

Languages
  - Official: Telugu, Urdu
- Time zone: UTC+5:30 (IST)
- PIN: 508001
- Telephone code: 91 8682
- Vehicle registration: TS 05

Marrigudem is a Village and Grampanchayat in Nalgonda mandal (Nalgonda district) in the Indian state of Telangana. The main source of income for the villagers is from Agriculture. The village is about 3 kilometers from Nalgonda (District Headquarters). As the village is very close to Nalgonda town, Villagers mostly depend on Dairy for livelihood. A Neighboring Village Girkabavigudem comes under Marrigudem Panchayithi election. Marrigudem Village has Government High School (Class 1 to 10).

The first citizen of Marrigudem village is its Sarpanch (President) who is elected every 5 years. The village is divided into 13 wards and each ward has its ward member elected every 5 years.

== Notes ==
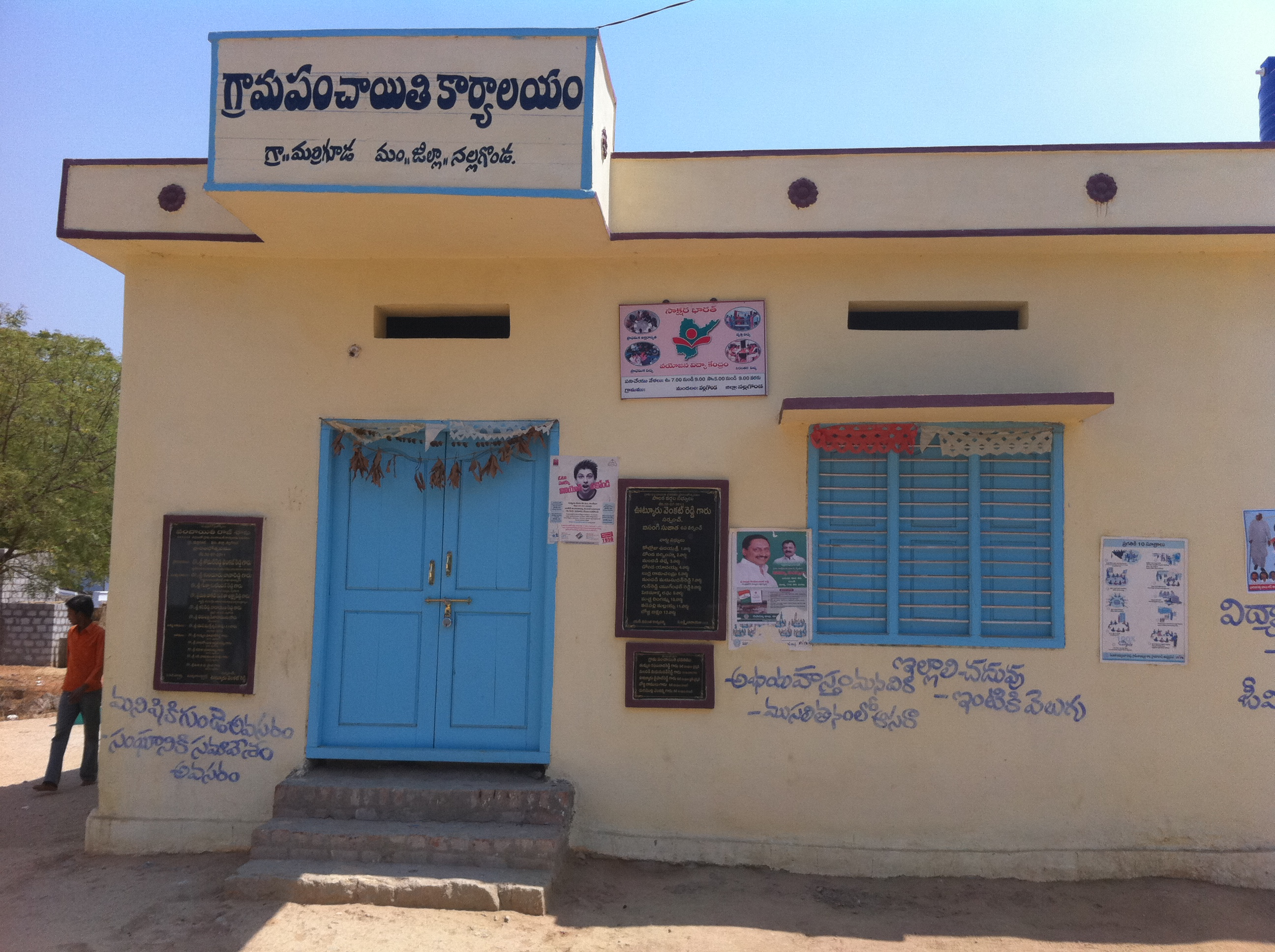
Marrigudem Village Panchayath Office
