= Kondoor, Nalgonda district =

Kondoor is a village in Marrigudam mandal in Nalgonda district, Telangana, India. The village is about 60 km from Hyderabad.
