= Chandupatla, Bhongir mandal =

Chandupatla
- village
- Location in Telangana, India Chandupatla (India)
- Coordinates: 17.5072403°N 78.9847147°E
- Country: India
- State: Telangana
- District: Nalgonda

Languages
  - Official: Telugu
- Time zone: UTC+5:30 (IST)
- PIN: 508116
- Telephone code: 08685
- Vehicle registration: TG
- Nearest city: Hyderabad
- Lok Sabha constituency: Bhongiri
- Vidhan Sabha constituency: Bhongiri
- Website: telangana.gov.in

Chandupatla is a village in Yadadri district of the Indian state of Telangana. It is administered under Bhongir mandal of Bhongir revenue division.
