= Yadavally =

Village in an Indian state

Yadavally (also spelled Madha Yadavally, M Yadavally, Yadavally or Yadavalli) is a village located in Narketpally mandal, Nalgonda district of Telangana, India. It is connected to Hyderabad, the state capital, by National Highway 9 and to Nalgonda by the SH 2 State Highway.

Yadavally is a Gram panchayat and 3 small villages come under it:

- Naibai (Reddys colony)
- Pothineni Pally
- Surya Nagar

It has 1 sarpanch and 10 ward members.

Yadavally village comes under Assembly constituency nakerkal and Parliament constituency Bhuvanagiri.

== Temples ==
- Hanuman temple in the middle of the village
- Muthyala temple in Naibai
- Ganga Devamma temple
- Hanuman temple in Naibai
