= Nagireddipally =

- village
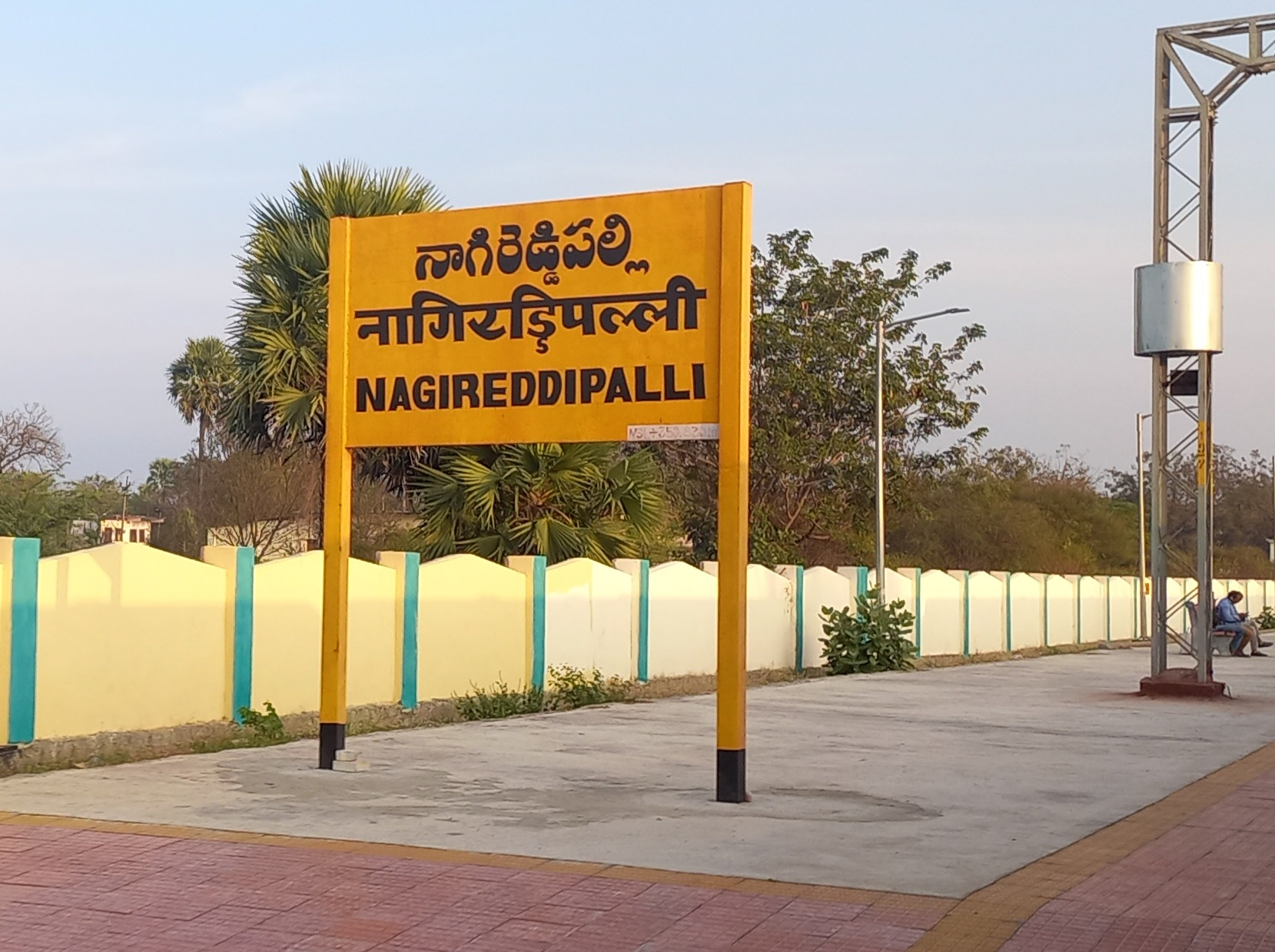

- Location in Telangana, India Nagireddipally (India)
- Coordinates: 17.4228288°N 78.9403185°E
- Country: India
- State: Telangana
- District: Nalgonda

Area
  - Total: 2,000 km^{2} (770 sq mi)
  - Rank: 5

Population
  - Total: 17,000
  - Rank: 9
  - Density: 8.5/km^{2} (22/sq mi)

Languages
  - Official: Telugu
- Time zone: UTC+5:30 (IST)
- PIN: 508285
- Telephone code: 08720
- Vehicle registration: TS
- Nearest city: Hyderabad
- Lok Sabha constituency: Bhongiri
- Vidhan Sabha constituency: Bhongiri
- Website: www.allmarriagehalls.com

Nagireddipally is a village in Nalgonda district of Telangana, India. It falls under Bhongir mandal.

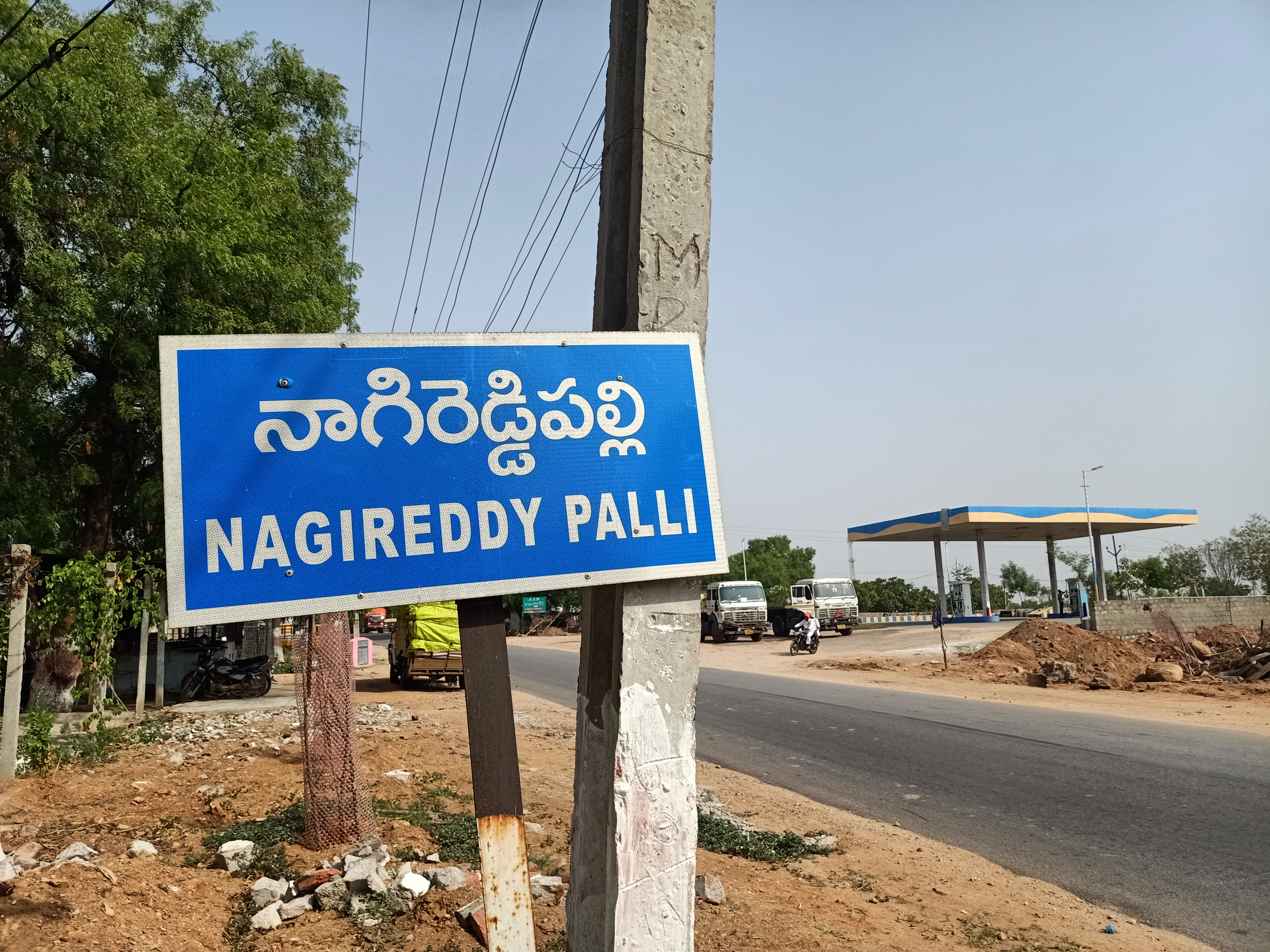
Nagireddypally is a village in Nalgonda district of Telangana
