= Venkiryal =

Coordinates: 17°02′N 78°03′E

- Village
- Interactive map of Venkiryal
- Country: India
- State: Andhra Pradesh

Languages
  - Official: Telugu
- Time zone: UTC+5:30 (IST)
- Vehicle registration: AP

Venkiryal is a village in Nalgonda district in Andhra Pradesh, India. It falls under Bibinagar mandal.
