= Chinnaravula Pally =

- Village
- Country: India
- State: Telangana

Languages
  - Official: Telugu
- Time zone: UTC+5:30 (IST)
- Vehicle registration: TS

Chinnaravula Pally is a village in Nalgonda district in Telangana, India. It falls under Bibinagar mandal.
