= Uppalaphad =

Uppalapahad
- Village
- Country: India
- State: Telangana

Population
  - Total: 800

Languages
  - Official: Telugu
- Time zone: UTC+5:30 (IST)
- Postal code: 508111
- Vehicle registration: TS
- Sex ratio: 1:1 ♂/♀
- Website: telangana.gov.in

Uppalaphad is a village in the Indian state of Telangana's Nalgonda district. It falls under Atmakur mandal. Uppalapahad received a model village award by president of India from Nalgonda. Repaka, Parupally, Modugubaigudem and Pothireddy pally are the neighbor villages for Uppalapahad.
