= Raipally, Nalgonda district =

Raipally
- Village
- Location in Telangana, India
- Coordinates: 17°28′20″N 79°06′57″E
- Country: India
- State: Telangana

Languages
  - Official: Telugu
- Time zone: UTC+5:30 (IST)

Raipally is a village in Nalgonda district in Telangana, India. It falls under Atmakur mandal.
