= Pittampally =

- village
- Location in Telangana, India Pittampally (India)
- Coordinates: 17.22111°N 79.064012°E
- Country: India
- State: Andhra Pradesh
- District: Nalgonda

Population
  - Total: 1,500

Languages
  - Official: Telugu
- Time zone: UTC+5:30 (IST)

Pittampally is a village in Chityal mandal in Nalgonda district, Andhra Pradesh, India. It is located to the west of the village of Chityal along National Highway 9. The population of the village is about 1,500. The soil is red and black, and the main source of living is agriculture. Paddy, sunflower, tobacco, vegetables, dairy and horticulture are grown.
