= Chamapur =

Coordinates: 17°32′N 79°08′E

- Village
- Interactive map of Chamapur
- Country: India
- State: Telangana

Languages
  - Official: Telugu
- Time zone: UTC+5:30 (IST)
- Vehicle registration: TS

Chamapur is a village in Nalgonda district in Telangana, India. It falls under Atmakur mandal.
