= Swamulavaari Lingotam =

Swamulavaari Lingotam S.W Lingotam
- Village
- Nickname: Lingotam
- Country: India
- State: Telangana

Government
  - Body: Government of Telangana
  - Sarpanch: Angirekula Pandu
  - MLA: Komatireddy Rajagopal Reddy
  - MP: Komatireddy Venkat Reddy

Population (2011)
  - Total: 2,629

Languages
  - Official: Telugu
- Time zone: UTC+5:30 (IST)
- Postal code: 508373
- Vehicle registration: TG
- Website: telangana.gov.in

Swamulavaari Lingotam is a village in Nalgonda district in Telangana, India. It falls under Nampally Mandal, Telangana, India 508373.
