= Mahatma Gandhi University, Telangana =

Public university in India

Mahatma Gandhi University
- Former name: Nalgonda University
- Type: Public University
- Established: 2007; 19 years ago
- Chancellor: Governor of Telangana
- Vice-Chancellor: Khaja Althaf Hussain
- Location: Anneparthy, Nalgonda, Telangana, India; 17°03′N 79°16′E
- Website: Official website,

Mahatma Gandhi University, Nalgonda is a public university located at Nalgonda district, Telangana, India.

== History ==
The university is a state university, established in 2007 by the Government of Andhra Pradesh. It was formerly called as Nalgonda University. It is a self-funded public university. It has an engineering college established in 2013 located in panagal, Nalgonda. The Government of Andhra Pradesh established Nalgonda University in the year 2007 vide Government Orders in G.O.19/HE (UE-II) Department, dt: 13 March 2007 by suitably amending the Andhra Pradesh Universities Act 1991 under Section-3(1) in L.A.Bill No.4 of 2007. The establishment of this university is part of the vision of the Government of Andhra Pradesh to promote access, equity and inclusiveness in Higher Education and foundation stone laid by former Chief Minister YS Rajsekar Reddy.

This university has been renamed by the Government of Andhra Pradesh as Mahatma Gandhi University by amending the Schedule of Act 4 of 1991, which was published in the A.P. Gazette on 28 April 2008. The University Headquarters were located in Nalgonda town during the reporting year 2010-11 and its permanent campus is being developed in 240 acres of land allotted to the university on the state highway (Nalgonda – Narketpally) at Anneparthy, 7 km from Nalgonda town.

== Infrastructure ==
It is located on a 300-acre area at Nalgonda town. And it has a 16-acre engineering college located in panagal, Nalgonda.

== See also ==
- List of universities in India
- Universities and colleges in India
- Education in India
