= Ogulapur =

- Village
- Country: India
- State: Telangana

Languages
  - Official: Telugu
- Time zone: UTC+5:30 (IST)

Ogulapur is a village in Nalgonda district in Telangana, India. It falls under Atmakur mandal.

In June 2022, it was proposed by the Telangana government to set up Telangana Special Food Processing Zone at Ogulapur and land was acquired.

== Schools ==
There is M.P.U.P School in the village.
