= Veliminedu =

Veliminedu is a village of around 10,000 people in Chityal mandal within the Nalgonda district of Telangana, India. National Highway 65 runs through the village.

This village is not to be confused with another village by the same name near Ibrahim Patnam in Ranga Reddy, another district of Telangana.

The village is mainly agricultural. In 2020, farmers within the village protested attempts by the local government in Telangana to acquire land for development purposes. Dera Sacha Sauda owns 56 acres of land in the village, and has a compound there.
