= Uthatoor =

Uthatoor is a small village located in Ramannapeta mandal, Yadadri Bhuvanagiri district, Telangana state, India. It has nearly 1000 voters.
