= Thimmapur, Nalgonda district =

Thimmapur
- Village
- Country: India
- State: Telangana

Languages
  - Official: Telugu
- Time zone: UTC+5:30 (IST)
- Website: telangana.gov.in

Thimmapur is a village in Nalgonda district in Telangana, India. It falls under Atmakur mandal.
