= Pothireddypally =

- Village
- Country: India
- State: Telangana

Languages
  - Official: Telugu
- Time zone: UTC+5:30 (IST)

Pothireddypally is a village in Nalgonda district in Telangana, India. It belongs to Atmakur mandal.

The Village is located between two minor rivers, Bikkeru and Suddala vaagu. Pothireddypally received the Nirmal Puraskar Award From President of India, For 100 per cent Drainage and Sanitation connections for households.

There is an ancient Rama temple and a Durga matha in the village.

Pothireddypally has approximately one thousand inhabitants.
