= Rudravelly, Nalgonda district =

Rudravelly
- Village
- Country: India
- State: Telangana

Languages
  - Official: Telugu
- Time zone: UTC+5:30 (IST)

Rudravelly is a village in Nalgonda district in Telangana, India. It falls under Bibinagar mandal. Bhongir is 18 km from Rudravelly. Road connectivity is there from Bhongir to Rudravelly.
