= Kerchipally =

- Village
- Kerchipally location in Telangana Kerchipally (India)
- Coordinates: 17.428425°N 79.045439°E
- Country: India
- State: Telangana
- Region: Telangana
- District: Yadadri Bhuvanagiri
- Mandal: Valigonda
- Elevation: 290 m (950 ft)

Languages
  - Official: Telugu
- Time zone: UTC+5:30 (IST)
- PIN: 508112
- Climate: hot (Köppen)

Kerchipally is a small village located in Valigonda mandal, Nalgonda district, in the Indian state of Telangana.
