= Jangaon, Nalgonda district =

Jangaon
- Village
- Location in Telangana, India Jangaon (India)
- Coordinates: 17.052396°N 79.2671739°E
- Country: India
- State: Telangana

Languages
  - Official: Telugu
- Time zone: UTC+5:30 (IST)
- PIN: 508 xxx
- Vehicle registration: TS
- Website: telangana.gov.in

Jangaon is a village in Nalgonda district in Telangana, India.
