= B.Thurka Palle, Nalgonda district =

B. Thurka Palle
- Village
- Location in Andhra Pradesh, India B. Thurka Palle (India)
- Coordinates: 17.35°N 79.21°E
- Country: India
- State: Telangana
- District: Nalgonda

Languages
  - Official: Telugu
- Time zone: UTC+5:30 (IST)

B.Thurka Palle is a village in the Nalgonda district of the Indian state of Telangana. It is located in Ramannapet mandal of Bhongir revenue division.
