= Akaram =

- Village
- Location in Telangana, India
- Coordinates: 17°49′N 78°44′E
- Country: India
- State: Telangana
- District: Medak

Languages
  - Official: Telugu
- Time zone: UTC+5:30 (IST)

Akaram is a village in Nalgonda district in the Indian state of Telangana. It is located in shaligouraram mandal.
