= Koyalagudem, Yadadri Bhuvanagiri district =

Koyalagudem Koyalagudem
- Village
- Location in Telangana, India
- Coordinates: 17.2541102°N 78.8457269°E
- Country: India
- State: Telangana
- District: Yadadri Bhuvanagiri district

Government
  - Type: Gram panchayat

Population (2001)
  - Total: 3,350

Languages
  - Official: Telugu
- Time zone: UTC+5:30 (IST)
- PIN: 508252
- Telephone code: 08694
- Vehicle registration: TG 30
- Nearest city: Hyderabad
- Lok Sabha constituency: Bhongir (Lok Sabha constituency)
- Vidhan Sabha constituency: Munugode Assembly constituency
- Website: epanchayat.telangana.gov.in

Koyalgudem is a village in Choutuppal mandal, Yadadri Bhuvanagiri district in Telangana, India. This village popular for its 100% cotton and silk handloom (Ikat) manufacturing and exports. This village is separated from Ellambavi, a new gram panchayath was formed in 2018.

== Politics ==
Bhuvanagiri as a Lok Sabha constituency came into existence in 2008 as per Delimitation Act of 2002.

- Komatireddy Venkat Reddy is the present MP
- Kusukuntla Prabhakar Reddy is the present MLA
- Jella Venkatesham is the present MPTC
- Macharla Krishna is the Ex Sarpanch

== Nearest cities ==
- Hyderabad - 45 km
- Pedda Amberpet ORR - 24 km
- Nalgonda - 58 km
- Suryapet - 94 km

== Transport ==
- Nearest Local Bus stop: Koyalagudem - 0 Km
- Nearest Bus station: Choutuppal - 5 Km
- Nearest Railway Division(All Trains): Secunderabad Code:SC - 51Km
- Nearest Airport: RGIA Hyderabad(Shamshabad) - 59Km
