= Duppelli =

- Village
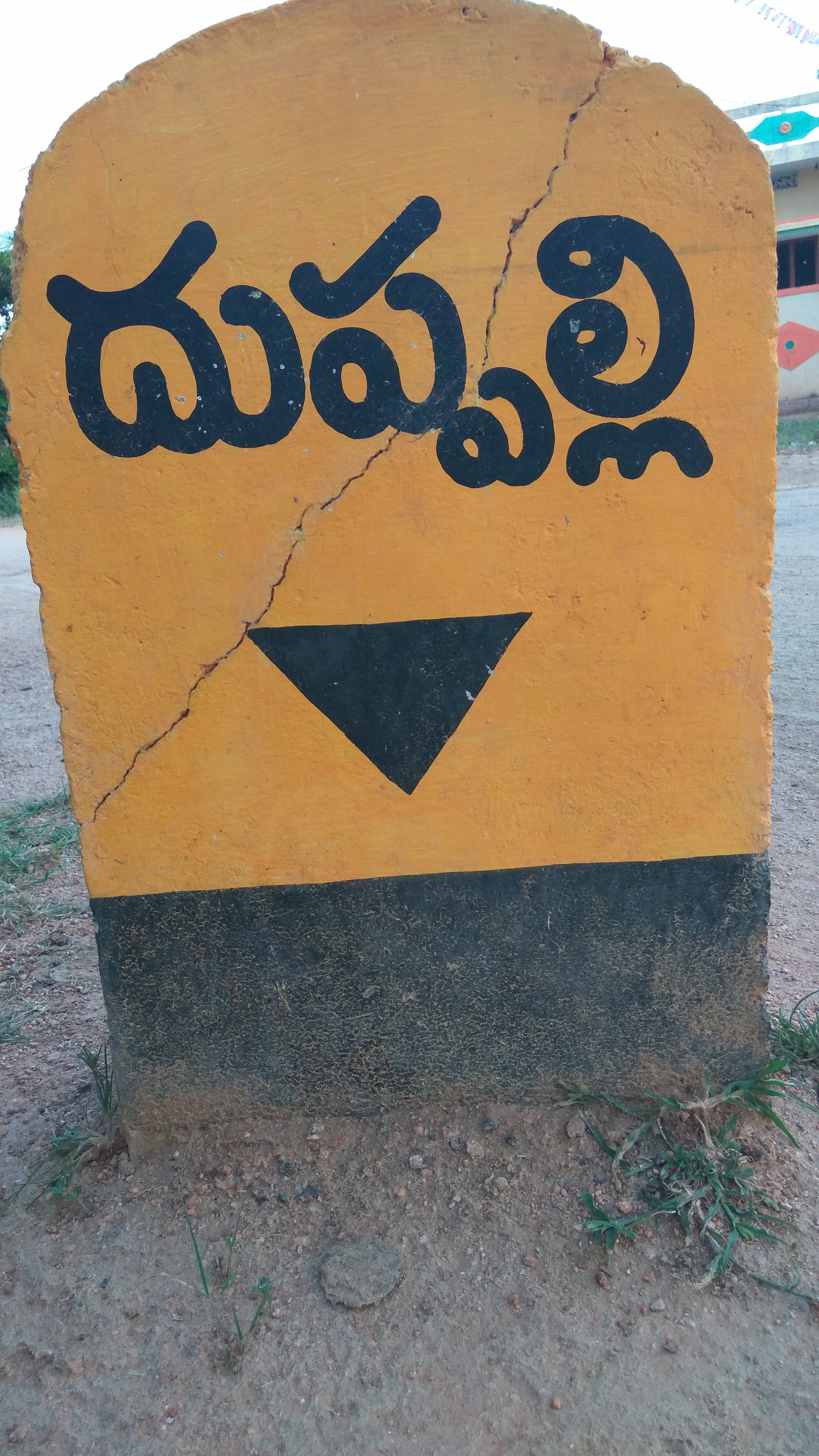
- Country: India
- State: Telangana

Area
  - Total: 5 km^{2} (1.9 sq mi)

Languages
  - Official: Telugu
- Time zone: UTC+5:30 (IST)
- Vehicle registration: TS

Duppelly is a village in Yadadri Bhongir district, in Telangana, India. It falls under Valigonda Mandal, Pincode 508112,
