= Ramannapeta =

Ramannapeta రామన్నపేట
- Location in Telangana, India Ramannapeta (India)
- Coordinates: 17.2833°N 79.0859°E
- Country: India
- State: Telangana
- District: Bhuvanagiri

Area
  - Total: 9.02 km^{2} (3.48 sq mi)
- Elevation: 304 m (997 ft)

Population (2011)
  - Total: 10,202
  - Density: 1,130/km^{2} (2,930/sq mi)

Languages
  - Official: Telugu
- Time zone: UTC+5:30 (IST)
- Vehicle registration: TG 30
- Website: telangana.gov.in

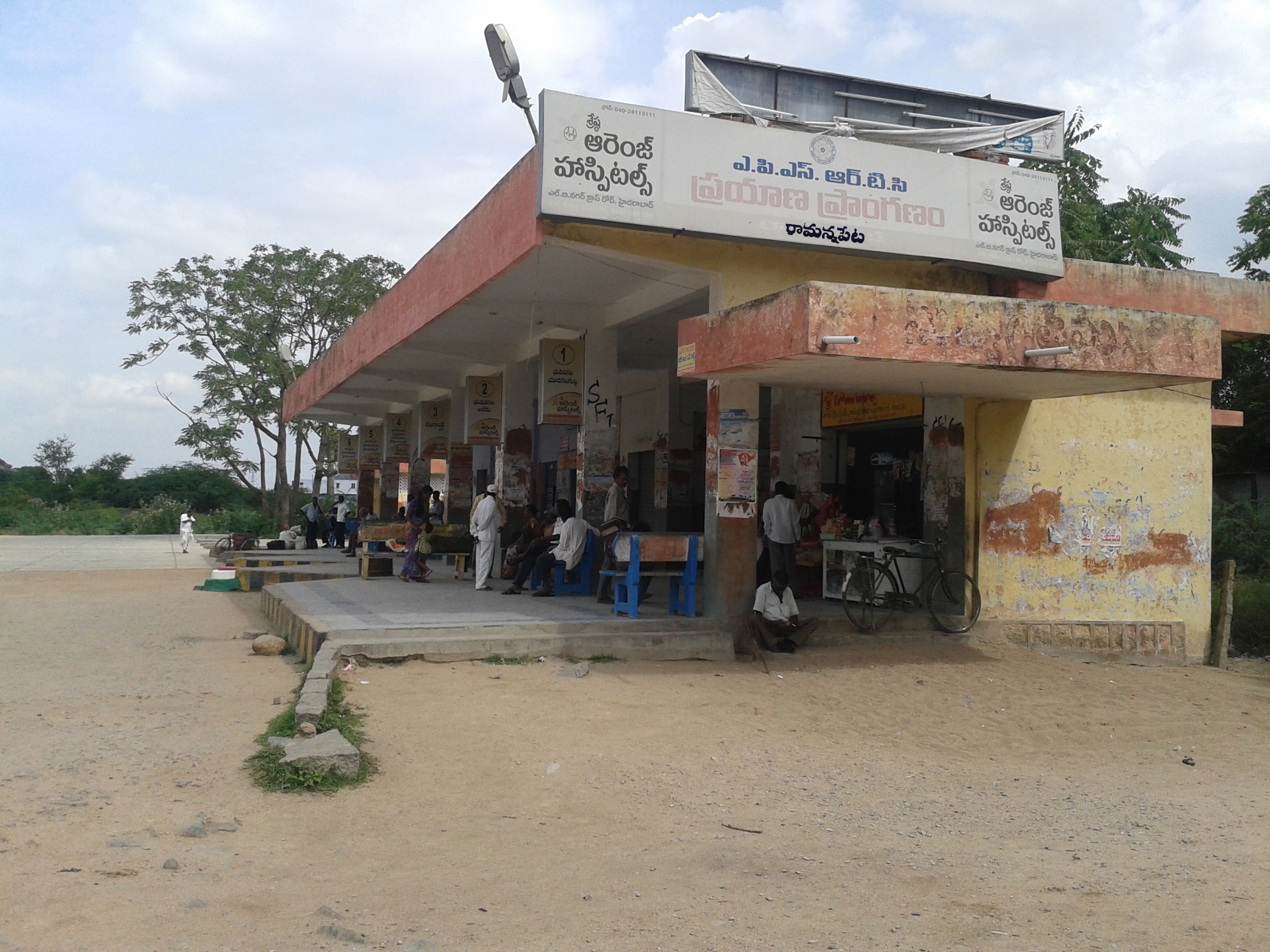
Ramannapet bustand

Ramannapeta is a village in Yadadri Bhuvanagiri district of the Indian state of Telangana. It is located in Ramannapeta mandal of Bhongir division.

== Geography ==
Ramanapeta is located at 17.2833°N 79.2859°E. It has an average elevation of 322 meters (1073 ft).

== Nearest cities ==
Nalgonda-35 km, Suryapet-68 km, Hyderabad-83 km.
