= Devalamma Naagaram =

Devalamma Naagaram D.Nagaram
- Village
- Location in Telangana, India Devalamma Naagaram (India)
- Coordinates: 17.2410851°N 78.847465699999°E
- Country: India
- State: Telangana

Languages
  - Official: Telugu
- Time zone: UTC+5:30 (IST)
- Pincode: 508252
- Telephone Code: 08694
- Vehicle registration: TS

Devalamma Naagaram is a village in Yadadri in Telangana, India. It falls under Choutuppal mandal. This village falls under Munugodu assembly and Bhongir parliament constitution.

Newly constructed Kalyana Mandapam at Ramalayam
