= Rahimkhanpet =

- Village
- Location in Telangana, India
- Coordinates: 17°28′35″N 79°11′44″E
- Country: India
- State: Telangana

Languages
  - Official: Telugu
- Time zone: UTC+5:30 (IST)
- Postal code: 508 111

Rahimkhanpet is a village in Yadadri Bhuvanagiri district in Telangana, India. It falls under Atmakur mandal Rahim Khanpet is a vibrant village located in Atmakur (M) Mandal, Yadadri Bhuvanagiri District, Telangana State. The village is recognized as a progressive settlement with a strong communist ideology and is known for playing a significant role in the struggle against the Razakars.

The village has an ancient and magnificent Shiva temple dating back to the Nizam’s rule, situated atop a hill. The main temples of the village — the Durgaamma Temple, Sri Kantla Maheshwara Temple and Bheerappa Temple — are regarded as the presiding deities and serve as the spiritual foundation of the villagers’ faith.

There are two Anganwadi centers and one Public Distribution System (ration) shop in the village. Agriculture is the primary occupation, with paddy being the chief crop, while cotton is cultivated as a secondary (dryland) crop.

To the south of the village flows the Bikkeru stream, which is a vital source of both drinking water and irrigation, serving as the lifeline of the community..
