= Arjalabai =

- village
- Location in Telangana, India Arjalabai (India)
- Coordinates: 17.0600°N 79.3°E
- Country: India
- State: Telangana
- District: Nalgonda
- Elevation: 17.0700 m (56.004 ft)

Languages
  - Official: Telugu
- Time zone: UTC+5:30 (IST)
- PIN: 508001
- Telephone code: 08682
- Website: telangana.gov.in

Arjalabai is a village and Gram panchayat of Nalgonda mandal, Nalgonda district, in Telangana state, in India.
