= Katepally =

- Village
- Country: India
- State: Telangana

Languages
  - Official: Telugu
- Time zone: UTC+5:30 (IST)
- PIN: 508111

Katepally is a village in yadadri district in Telangana, India. It falls under motakondur mandal.
