= Inupamula =

Inupamula is a village of Kethepally mandal in the Nalgonda district of Telangana, India.
