= Kondapur, Ghatkesar mandal =

Kondapur
- Village
- Interactive map of Kondapur
- Country: India
- State: Telangana
- Metro: Hyderabad
- Pincode: 501301

Languages
  - Official: Telugu
- Time zone: UTC+5:30 (IST)
- Telephone code: 040
- Vehicle registration: TS 07
- Website: telangana.gov.in

Kondapur is a village in Medchal-Malkajigiri in Telangana. It comes under The Ghatkesar Mandal. The town shares its boundaries with Ghatkesar. Kondapur is a part of The Hyderabad Metropolitan Development Authority.

== Economy ==
Kondapur has many shops that include vegetable shops, clothing and textile shops, hardware and electrical shops, general stores etc. The nearest Bus and Railway Stations are available in Ghatkesar which are about 3 kilometers from Kondapur. Kondapur features plenty of schools and colleges including Government education facilities. Sports Facilities are also available here. There are also a couple of factories located here. It also has a couple of Restaurants and Cafeterias.
