= Annareddy Guda =

Annareddy Guda Annareddygudem
- village
- Location in Telangana, India Annareddy Guda (India)
- Coordinates: 16.991524°N 79.292804°E
- Country: India
- State: Telangana
- District: Nalgonda

Languages
  - Official: Telugu
- Time zone: UTC+5:30 (IST)
- PIN: 508001
- Telephone code: 08682
- Vehicle registration: TS
- Website: telangana.gov.in

Annareddy Guda (also spelled Annareddygudem) is a village of the Nalgonda district in the state of Telangana, India. As of the 2011 Census of India, the village had a population of 675 people across 164 households.
