= Jaikesaram =

- Village
- Location in Andhra Pradesh, India Jaikesaram (India)
- Coordinates: 17.2410851°N 78.847465699999°E
- Country: India
- State: Telangana

Languages
  - Official: Telugu
- Time zone: UTC+5:30 (IST)

Jaikesaram is a village in Nalgonda district in Telangana, India. It falls under Choutuppal mandal.

As of the 2010 India census this village has a population of 5051. In this village have been 11 wards.
