= Perur, Nalgonda district =

Ancient village in Telangana, India

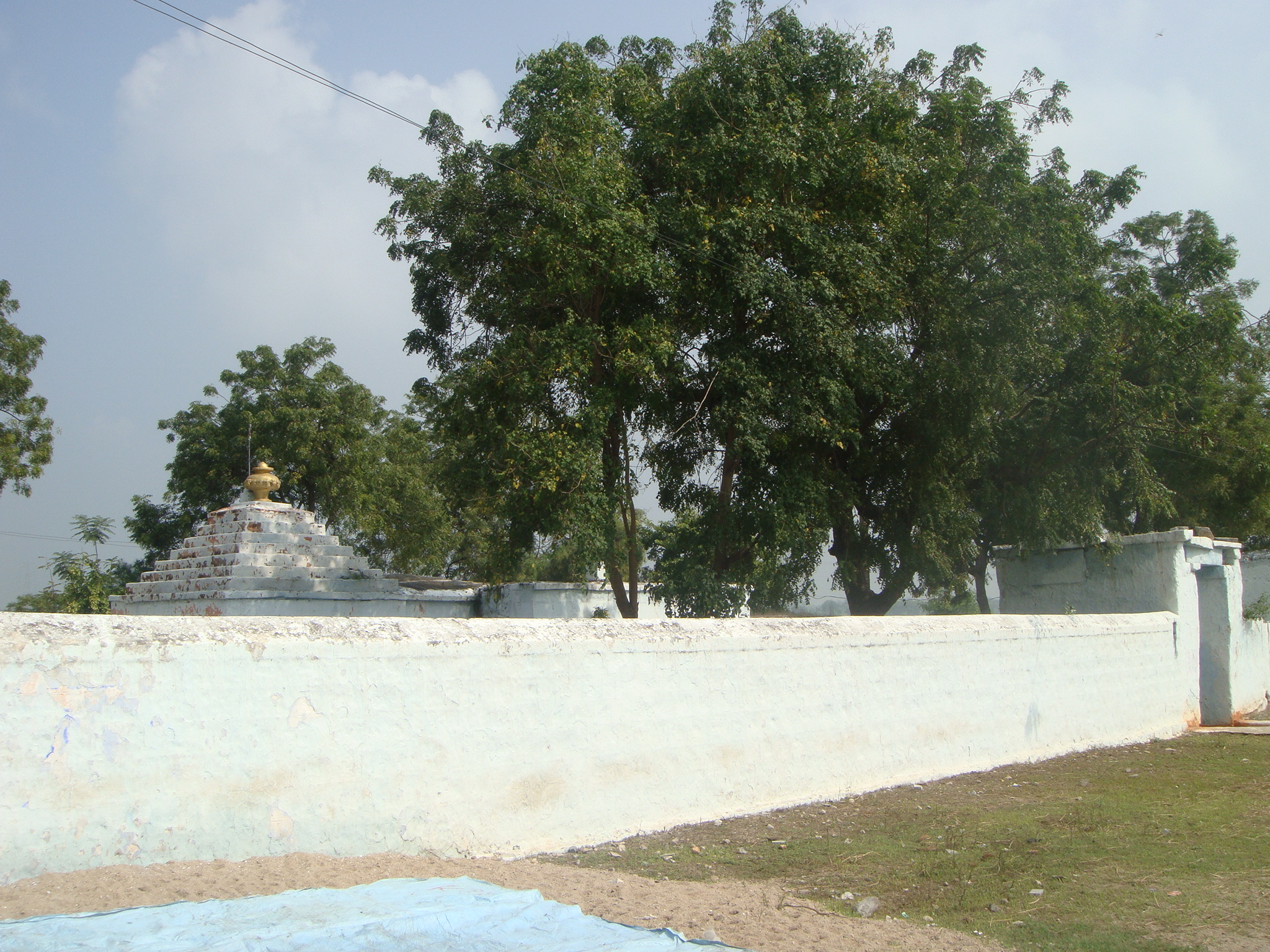

Perur is an ancient village in the State of Telangana, India. It is in the Nalgonda district. Perur is the home of Lord "Swayambhu Someswara swami"; this temple of Lord Shiva is a place of traditional worship and is treated as very auspicious and powerful.

It is about 25 kilometres (16 mi) from Nagarjuna Sagar and 168 kilometres (104 mi) from Hyderabad. The nearest town to Perur is Haliya, 5 kilometres (3.1 mi) away. One can reach Haliya from the towns Nalgonda, Miryalaguda or Nagarjuna Sagar.

The village is surrounded by paddy firms and small lakes. It has a pond called SOMASAMUDHRAM which provides water for irrigation purpose for more than 300 acer's to the villages of Perur, pullareddy gudem & chelamareddy gudem.

== The Temple ==
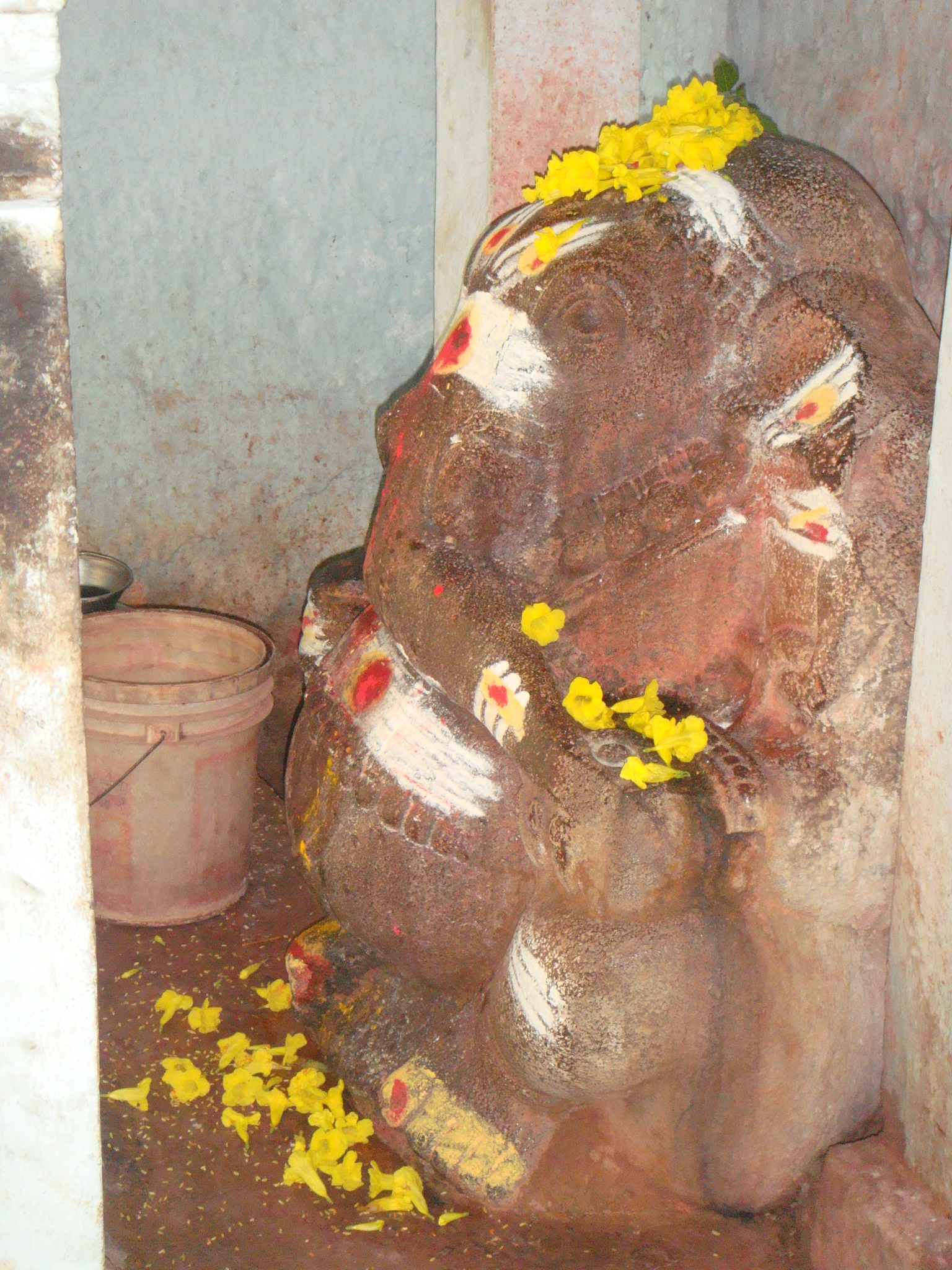

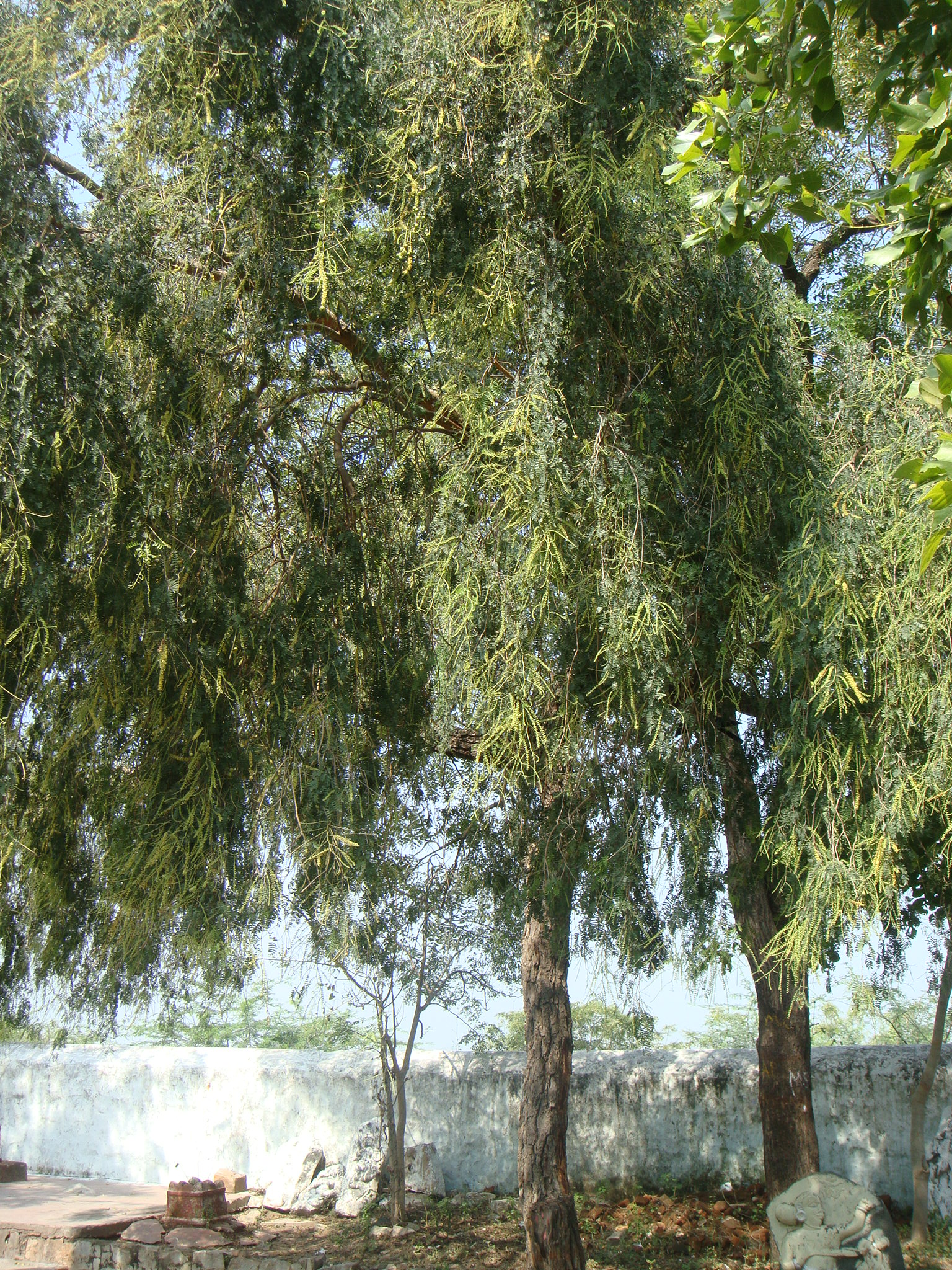

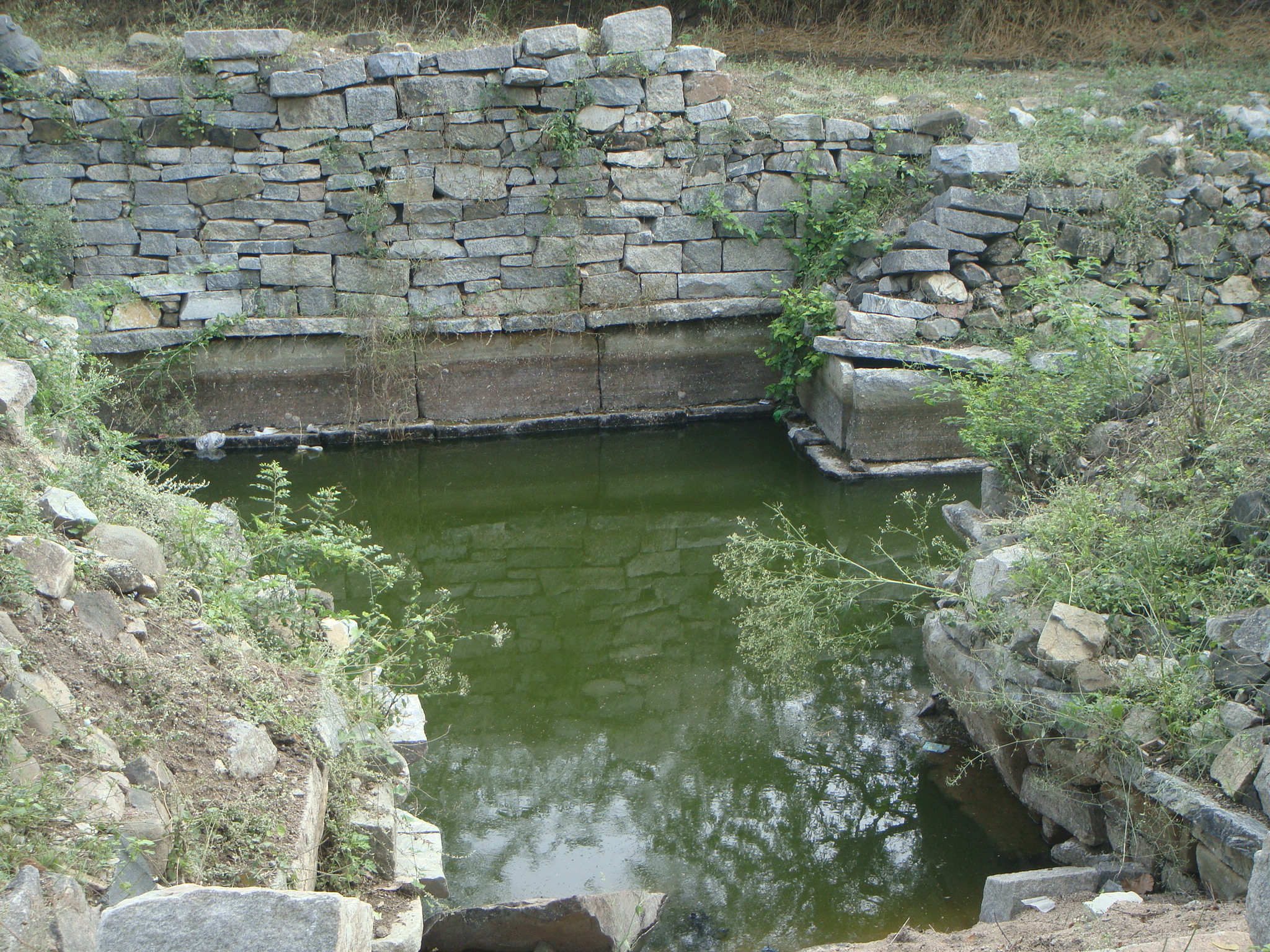

The Swayambhu Someswara temple is very ancient, and the Shiva Lingam is the "self incarnation" of Lord Shiva. Thus the name "Swayam Bhu Someswara". Late Sri. Katakam Shankara Sharma of this village installed the temple and its Dhwaja Stambham in 1950s. The erection of Dhwaja Stambham was an all-village event and everyone participated with devotion.

On Shiva Ratri, the temple has special poojas including Abhishekam. Its treated similar to Srisailam Temple. There will be a Jaatara for about 3 days and also special attractions like "Edla pandem" ("bullock cart competitions") "Gundu pandem" and "kabaddi".

The temple construction is a work of art, especially the Nandi, which is situated at the door of the Garbha Gudi. The artwork on the pillars of the temple depicts important chapters of Ramayana.

The temple has a unique statue of Ganesha, whose head closely resembles that of an elephant. The temple has a Jammi plant on the left side which is treated auspicious due to its age and placement. Opposite the dhwaja stambham is a kolanu (pond), traditionally used by devotees for bathing before making offerings. More recently, a large statue of Nandi was constructed in front of the temple. Janapati families have organized religious observances at the temple during Shivaratri, Dussehra, and Kartik Purnima for many years.

== Other information ==
There is a Ramalayam in the village. It is also very famous. Every year Sriramanavami is celebrated here very grandly. Another temple Lord Hanuman also there in the village..

Perur's sister towns are "Madhar Gudem" and "Anjaneya Tanda", " Pulla Reddy Gudem", "Veerlagadda Thanda".

Perur is also pronounced as Peroor.
