= Mall, Ranga Reddy district =

Mall
- Village
- Location in Telangana, India Mall (India)
- Coordinates: 16.97°N 78.73°E
- Country: India
- State: Telangana

Languages
  - Official: Telugu
- Time zone: UTC+5:30 (IST)
- Telephone code: 08414
- Vehicle registration: TS 14 X XXXX

Mall is a village on the border of Nalgonda and Ranga Reddy districts in Telangana, India. It falls under Chinthapally and Yacharam mandals, respectively.
