= Nancharipet =

- Village
- Country: India
- State: Telangana

Languages
  - Official: Telugu
- Time zone: UTC+5:30 (IST)
- Vehicle registration: TG 30

Nancharipet is a village in Yadadri Bhuvanagiri district in Telangana, India. It falls under Motakondur mandal. It is located 25 KM towards South from district headquarters Bhuvanagiri. Regional Language of Nancharipet is Telugu. Hyderabad, Aler &, Jangaon are some important Towns nearby.
