= Mannevaripampu =

- village
- Location in Telangana, India Mannevaripampu (India)
- Coordinates: 17.5362585°N 78.8349109°E
- Country: India
- State: Telangana
- District: Yadadri Bhongiri

Government
  - Type: Panchayati raj (India)
  - Body: Gram panchayat

Languages
  - Official: Telugu
- Time zone: UTC+5:30 (IST)
- PIN: 508116
- Telephone code: 08685
- Vehicle registration: TS
- Nearest city: Hyderabad
- Lok Sabha constituency: [[Bhuvanagiri, Telangana]|Bhongiri]]
- Vidhan Sabha constituency: [[Bhuvanagiri, Telangana]|Bhongiri]]
- Website: telangana.gov.in

Mannevaripampu is a village in Yadadri Bhongiri district of Telangana, India. It falls under Bhongir mandal.
