= Itukulapahad =

Itukulapahad is a small village of the Shaligowraram mandal Nalgonda district in Telangana. The nearest town is Nakrekal, which is 21 kilometres.
