= Vallabhapuram, Nalgonda district =

Vallabhapuram
- village
- Location in Telangana, India Vallabhapuram (India)
- Coordinates: 17.0600°N 79.3°E
- Country: India
- State: Telangana
- District: Nalgonda
- Founder: Nagaraju Chimata (Raju)
- Elevation: 17.0700 m (56.004 ft)

Telugu, Hindi, English, Urdu
  - Official: Telugu
- Time zone: UTC+5:30 (IST)
- PIN: 508278
- Telephone code: 08689
- Vehicle registration: TS
- Website: telangana.gov.in

Vallabhapuram is a village and Gram panchayat of Nidamanoor, mandal, Nalgonda district, in Telangana state.

Agriculture is the primary occupation of the village's residents. Local amenities in the village include a school, a temple, and a market.
