= Gundlabavi =

- Village
- Country: India
- State: Telangana

Languages TELUGU,
  - Official: Telugu
- Time zone: UTC+5:30 (IST)
- Postal code: 508252
- Vehicle registration: TS

Gundlabavi is a village in Yadadri Bhuvanagiri district in Telangana, India. It falls under Choutuppal mandal.
