= Kaisaram =

Kesaram
- village
- Location in Telangana, India Kesaram (India)
- Coordinates: 17.5227587°N 78.9616713°E
- Country: India
- State: Telangana
- District: Yadadri Bhuvanagiri district

Languages
  - Official: Telugu
- Time zone: UTC+5:30 (IST)
- Telephone code: 08720
- Vehicle registration: TS
- Nearest city: Hyderabad
- Lok Sabha constituency: Bhongiri
- Vidhan Sabha constituency: Bhongiri
- Website: telangana.gov.in

Kesaram is a village in Yadadri Bhuvanagiri district of Telangana, India. It is administered under Bhongir mandal.
