= T Repaka =

- Village
- Country: India
- State: Telangana

Languages
  - Official: Telugu
- Time zone: UTC+5:30 (IST)

T Repaka is a village in Yadadri Bhuvanagiri district, in the Indian state of Telangana. It is associated with Atmakur (M) mandal.

== Geography and location ==
T Repaka is located in Yadadri Bhuvanagiri district in the Indian state of Telangana. The district administration identifies Yadadri Bhuvanagiri as a district in Telangana, with its headquarters at Bhuvanagiri.

== Administrative divisions ==
T Repaka is associated with Atmakur (M) mandal in Yadadri Bhuvanagiri district. The district is administered through revenue divisions and mandals, as described by the district administration.

== Language ==
Telugu is the official language of Telangana.

== Time zone ==
The village observes Indian Standard Time (IST), which is UTC+05:30.
