= Nandanam, Bhongir mandal =

Nandanam
- village
- Location in Telangana, India Nandanam (India)
- Coordinates: 17.4519461°N 78.9251949°E
- Country: India
- State: Telangana
- District: Yadadri Bhuvanagiri district

Government
  - Type: Panchayati raj (India)
  - Body: Gram panchayat

Population (2011)
  - Total: 2,449

Languages
  - Official: Telugu
- Time zone: UTC+5:30 (IST)
- PIN: 508285
- Telephone code: 08720
- Vehicle registration: TG-30
- Nearest city: Hyderabad
- Lok Sabha constituency: Bhongiri
- Vidhan Sabha constituency: Bhongiri
- Website: telangana.gov.in

Nandanam is a village in Yadadri Bhuvanagiri district of Telangana, India. It falls under Bhongir mandal. It is located on Bhongir-Nalgonda road, 8 km (5.0 mi) southeast of the district headquarters Bhongir. It is situated 55 km (34 mi) from Hyderabad. Its population is 2449 as per 2011 census. Hyderabad is the nearest city. The village is 20 km (12 mi) from AIIMS Institute and Yadadri Temple city and 3 km (1.9 mi) from Raavi Narayan Reddy railway station.
