= Ellambhavi =

YELLAMBAVI KANKALA SHANKAR
- Village
- Location in Telangana, India YELLAMBAVI (India)
- Coordinates: 17°16′04″N 78°50′58″E
- Country: India
- State: Telangana

Population (2024)
  - Total: 1,300

Languages
  - Official: Telugu
- Time zone: UTC+5:30 (IST)
- Vehicle registration: TS
- Website: telangana.gov.in

YELLAMBAVI is a village in YADADRIBHUVANAGIRI district in Telangana, India. It falls under Choutuppal mandal.
