= Keethavarigudem =

- Village
- Country: India
- State: Telangana
- District: Suryapet

Population
  - Total: 1,000 families

Languages
  - Official: Telugu
- Time zone: UTC+5:30 (IST)
- PIN: 508201
- Telephone code: yes
- Lok Sabha constituency: Suryapet

Keethavari gudem is one of the villages located in Garidepally mandal in Suryapet district of Telangana in India. It is well developed village with having all the facilities like supermarket (Mana Raithanna mart), Petrol pump, Bank, temples etc.
