= Kondapur, Nalgonda district =

Kondapur
- Village
- Location in Telangana, India
- Coordinates: 17°28′34″N 79°05′51″E
- Country: India
- State: Telangana

Languages
  - Official: Telugu
- Time zone: UTC+5:30 (IST)

Kondapur is a village in Nalgonda district in Telangana, India. It falls under Atmakur mandal.
