= Kadaparthy =

- village
- Location in Telangana, India Kadaparthy (India)
- Coordinates: 17.0600°N 79.3°E
- Country: India
- State: Telangana
- District: Nalgonda
- Elevation: 17.0700 m (56.004 ft)

Languages
  - Official: Telugu
- Time zone: UTC+5:30 (IST)
- PIN: 508001
- Telephone code: 08682
- Vehicle registration: TG
- Website: telangana.gov.in

Kadaparthy is a large village and Gram panchayat of Nakrekal mandal, Nalgonda district, in Telangana state of India. with total 729 families residing. The Kadaparthy village has population of 2680 of which 1300 are males, while 1380 are females, as per Population Census 2011. The village is five kilometers away from the national highway 9 (Nakrekal).

In Kadaparthy village, the population of children from ages 0–6 is 272, which makes up 10.15% of the total population of the village. The Average Sex Ratio of Kadaparthy village is 1062, which is higher than the Andhra Pradesh state average of 993. The Child Sex Ratio for the Kadaparthy as per census is 889, lower than Andhra Pradesh's average of 939.

Kadaparthy village has a lower literacy rate compared to Andhra Pradesh. In 2011, the literacy rate of Kadaparthy village was 61.38%, compared to 67.02% of Andhra Pradesh. In Kadaparthy, the Male literacy stands at 71.97% while the female literacy rate was 51.60%.

As per constitution of India and Panchyati Raaj Act, Kadaparthy village is administrated by Sarpanch (Head of Village), who is elected representative of the village.

Kadaparthy Data

Particulars	Total	Male	Female
Total No. of Houses	729	-	-
Population	2,680	1,300	1,380
Child (0-6)	272	144	128
Schedule Caste	567	262	305
Schedule Tribe	3	0	3
Literacy	61.38 %	71.97 %	51.60 %
Total Workers	1,452	732	720
Main Worker	1,427	0	0
Marginal Worker	25	7	18

== Caste Factor ==
Schedule Caste (SC) constitutes 21.16 % while Schedule Tribe (ST) were 0.11 % of total population in Kadaparthy village.
