= Toopranpet =

- Village
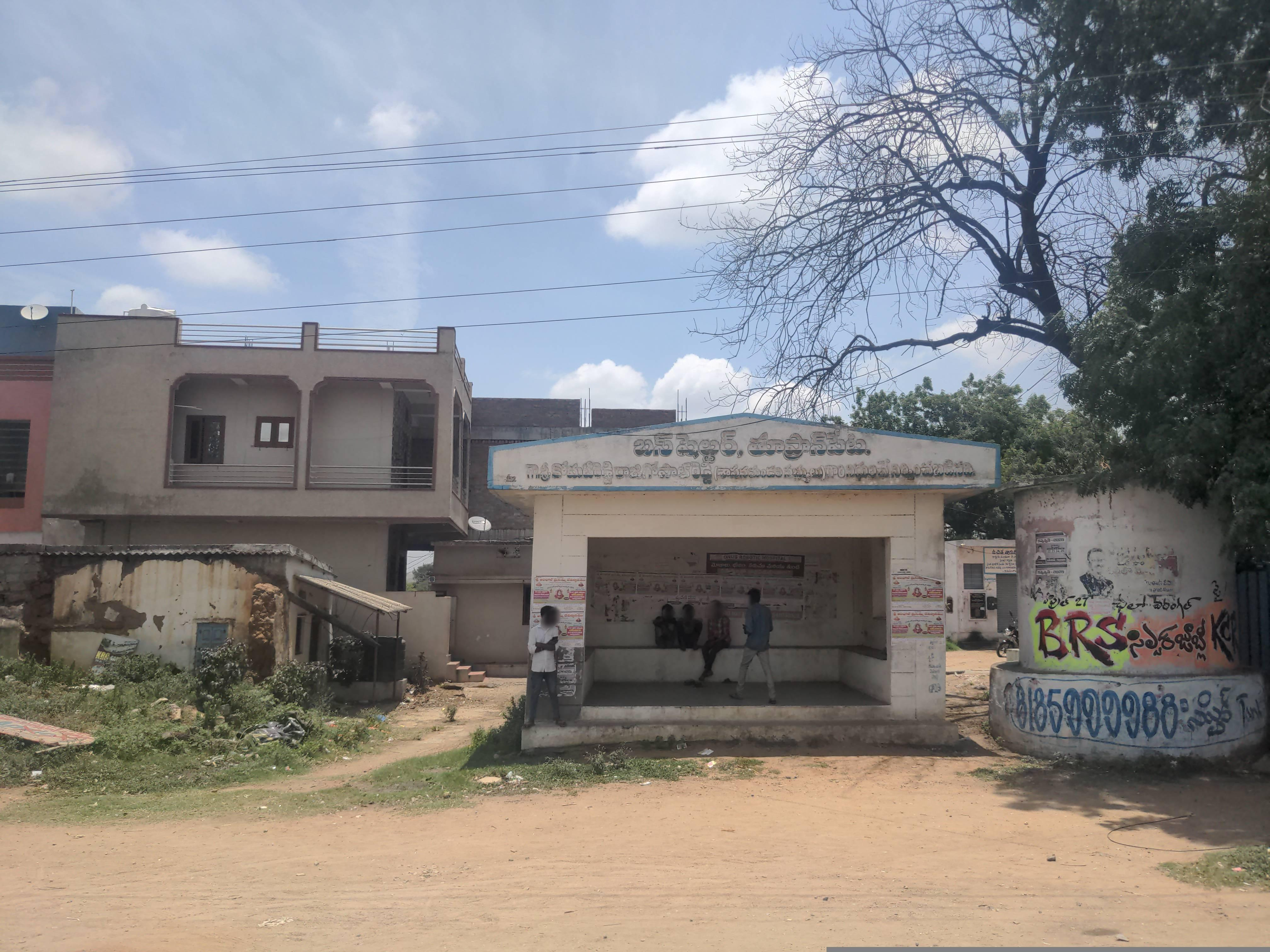
- Toopranpet bus shelter
- Country: India
- State: Telangana

Languages
  - Official: Telugu
- Time zone: UTC+5:30 (IST)

Toopranpet is a village in Nalgonda district in Telangana, India. It falls under the Choutuppal mandal.

== Background ==
There are many engineering colleges in the villages, including Netaji Engineering College and Dhruva Institute of Engineering & Technology. It is about 9.4 Km from the famous Ramoji film city. It takes 11 minutes to reach Toopranpet from Ramoji film city. It is very near to Mount Opera, Theme park located on Hyderabad - Vijayawada Highway, at Batasingaram. Mount Opera is an amusement park and Resort. The distance between Mount Opera and Toopranpet is about 7.3 kilometres.

Choutuppal and Bhoodan Pochampalli are nearby crowded and developed areas to Toopranpet. The distance between Toopranpet and Choutuppal is about 15.8 kilometres. The distance between Toopranpet and Bhoodan Pochampalli is about 15.1 kilometres.

It is located very near to Nehru Outer Ring Road, and surrounded by many Engineering Colleges. The distance between Outer Ring Road and Toopranpet is about 12 kilometres. Rajiv Gandhi International Airport can be reached via Nehru Outer Ring Road located about 12 kilometres from Toopranpet. The airport is 49.8 kilometres from Toopranpet.
