= Ratnavaram =

- village
- Location in Telangana, India Ratnavaram (India)
- Coordinates: 17.0600°N 79.3°E
- Country: India
- State: Telangana
- District: suryapet
- Elevation: 17.0700 m (56.004 ft)

Population
  - Total: 2,249

Languages
  - Official: Telugu
- Time zone: UTC+5:30 (IST)
- PIN: 508234
- Telephone code: 08682
- Vehicle registration: TS 29
- Website: telangana.gov.in

Ratnavaram is a village and Gram panchayat of Nadigudem mandal, Nalgonda district, in Telangana state. The closest town to Ratnavaram is Kodad.
