= Panthangi, Nalgonda district =

Panthangi
- Village
- Country: India
- State: Telangana

Languages
  - Official: Telugu
- Time zone: UTC+5:30 (IST)
- PIN: 508252

Pantangi or Panthangi is a village in Nalgonda district in Telangana, India. It falls under Choutuppal mandal. It is on the National Highway 9 and is 55 kilometers from Hyderabad.

== Population ==
According to the 2011 Census of India, the village of Panthangi, located in Yadadri Bhuvanagiri district of Telangana, had a total population of 6,307. The population consisted of 3,229 males and 3,078 females. The number of children in the 0–6 age group was approximately 670

== Schools ==
There is a Zilla Parishad High School here. Surendhar Lingaiah Rodda did his primary education from here. currently working as a Chief Manager, Bank of Baroda

== Commercial area ==
Nile Limited has its plant here.

NH 9 first toll gate is located here.

== Temples ==
Panthangi chanigala gutta shri laxmi narasimha swamy temple is located here.

There are 2 temples dedicated to God Shiva. One Temple on main Highway and another is near ZP School.

== Banks ==
State bank of India has opened a branch here.
