= Chada, Nalgonda district =

Chada
- Village
- Location in Telangana, India Chada (India)
- Coordinates: 17°29′57″N 79°04′32″E
- Country: India
- State: Telangana

Languages
  - Official: Telugu
- Time zone: UTC+5:30 (IST)
- Telephone code: 040
- Vehicle registration: TS XX X XXXX
- Website: telangana.gov.in

Chada is a village in Yadadri district in Telangana State, India. It falls under Atmakur mandal. The lake here called as Chada Cheruvu.
