= Ellagiri =

Yellagiri
- Village
- Location in Telangana, India Yellagiri (India)
- Coordinates: 17°16′03″N 78°50′22″E
- Country: India
- State: Telangana

Languages
  - Official: Telugu
- Time zone: UTC+5:30 (IST)
- Vehicle registration: TS
- Website: telangana.gov.in
