= Mangalpally, Ranga Reddy district =

Mangalpally
- Village
- Country: India
- State: Telangana

Languages
  - Official: Telugu
- Time zone: UTC+5:30 (IST)
- Telephone code: 040
- Vehicle registration: AP 26 X XXXX

Mangalpalle or Magalpally is a village in Ranga Reddy district in Telangana, India. It falls under Ibrahimpatnam mandal.

== Mangalpally Logistic Park ==
The Mangalapally Logistic Park, an inter-city truck terminal, which is coming up on 22 acres near the Outer Ring Road, Hyderabad towards Nagarjunasagar road at a cost of Rs.20 crore.
