= Hanumapur =

- Location in Telangana, India Hanumapur (India)
- Coordinates: 17.5633581°N 78.893381°E
- Country: India
- State: Telangana
- District: Yadadri Bhuvanagiri district

Languages
  - Official: Telugu
- Time zone: UTC+5:30 (IST)
- PIN: 508116
- Telephone code: 08685
- Vehicle registration: TS
- Nearest city: Hyderabad
- Lok Sabha constituency: Bhongiri
- Vidhan Sabha constituency: Bhongiri
- Website: telangana.gov.in

Hanumapur is a village in Bhongir mandal, Yadadri Bhuvanagiri district of Telangana, India.
