= Kotamarthy =

Coordinates: 17.409226°N 79.408514°E

Kotamarthy is a village in Mothkur Mandal, Nalgonda district, Telangana State, India. The postal code is 508277. According to the 2011 census, it had a population of 2,460 people.
