= Bottuguda =

- Village
- Location in Telangana, India Bottuguda (India)
- Coordinates: 17.053379°N 79.271783°E
- Country: India
- State: Telangana
- Region: Nalgonda District
- District: Nalgonda district

Languages
  - Official: Telugu
- Time zone: UTC+5:30 (IST)
- PIN: 508001
- Vehicle registration: TS 05

Bottuguda is one of the commercial and residential suburbs in Nalgonda district, in Telangana State.
