= Theratpally =

- city
- Location in Telangana, India
- Coordinates: 17.0530818°N 78.9402866°E
- Country: India
- State: Telangana
- District: Nalgonda

Languages
  - Official: Telugu
- Time zone: UTC+5:30 (IST)

Theratpally is a village in Nalgonda district in the state of Telangana, India.

== Geography ==
Theratpally is located at 17.0530818°N 78.9402866°E.

== Demographics ==
As of 2001 India census, Theratpally had a population of -,---. Males constitute 50% of the population and females 50%. Theratpally has an average literacy rate of 62%, higher than the national average of 59.5%; with male literacy of 73% and female literacy of 51%. 14% of the population is under 6 years of age.

== Industries ==
Agriculture is the major source of income to people living in and around Theratpally.

== Temples ==
Theratpally has got culture rich temples. PEDDAMMA GUTTA (there are nine temples in one place only)

peddamma temple
Chennakeshava Temple
Vishnu Temple (old temple)
Birappa Temple
Hanuman Temple
saai bba Temple
Mallikarjuna swamy Temple
Godadevi temple
Ganesh temple

VILLAGE TEMPLES:

- Chakali Rajaka Madivala Manchideva Temple in west Rajaka youth
- Markondaiah Temple,
- Shivalayam
- Kaatamaya Temple

== Schools & Colleges in Theratpally ==
Government Primary School

== Cinema Theaters ==
There are no theaters
