= Madgulapally =

Madgulapally is a mandal in Nalgonda district, Telangana, India. Madgulapally is located 24 kilometres (15 mi) from the district capital of Nalgonda, and serves as the hub of a series of smaller surrounding village that look to Madgulapally for its superior transportation access.
