= Masidugudem, Nalgonda district =

Masidugudem
- Village
- Country: India
- State: Telangana

Population (2001)
  - Total: 2,000
  - Density: 200/km^{2} (520/sq mi)

Languages
  - Official: Telugu
- Time zone: UTC+5:30 (IST)
- PIN: 508252
- Vehicle registration: AP

Maseed Gudem is a village in Nalgonda district in Telangana, India. It falls under Choutuppal mandal.
