= Vookondi =

- village
- Location in Telangana, India Vookondi (India)
- Coordinates: 17.0600°N 79.3°E
- Country: India
- State: Telangana
- District: Nalgonda

Population (2001)
  - Total: 2,274

Languages
  - Official: Telugu
- Time zone: UTC+5:30 (IST)
- PIN: 508244
- Telephone code: 08682
- Vehicle registration: TS
- Website: telangana.gov.in

Vookondi is a village and Gram panchayat of Nalgonda mandal, Nalgonda district, in Telangana state, India.

Veteran communist leader Dharma Biksham was born in this village.

== Demographics ==
According to Indian census, 2001, the demographic details of this village is as follows:

- Total Population: 2,274 in 481 Households.
- Male Population: 1,178 and Female Population: 1,096
- Children Under 6-years: 357 (Boys - 184 and Girls - 173)
- Total Literates: 1,111
