= Gurrampode =

- Village
- Location in Telangana, India Gurrampode (India)
- Coordinates: 16.8667°N 79.1167°E
- Country: India
- State: Telangana
- District: Nalgonda

Area
  - Total: 11.54 km^{2} (4.46 sq mi)
- Elevation: 209 m (686 ft)

Population (2011)
  - Total: 3,061
  - Density: 265.3/km^{2} (687.0/sq mi)

Languages
  - Official: Telugu
- Time zone: UTC+5:30 (IST)
- Vehicle registration: TG
- Website: telangana.gov.in

Gurrampode is a village in the Nalgonda district of the Indian state of Telangana. It is located in Gurrampode mandal of Devarakonda division.

== Geography ==
Gurrampod is located at 16.8667°N 79.1167°E. It has an average elevation of 209 metres (688 ft).
