= Kondamadugu =

Kondamadugu Kondamadugumettu
- Village
- Nickname: KMG
- Country: India
- State: Telangana

Languages
  - Official: Telugu
- Time zone: UTC+5:30 (IST)
- Postal code: 508126
- Vehicle registration: TS
- Website: telangana.gov.in

Kondamadugu is a village is also known as Kodamadugumettu in Yadadri Bhuvanagiri district in Telangana, India. It falls under Bibinagar mandal. High revenue generated village in the Yadadri District through Industries and Real Estate Sector. So many Visiting Places like Kondamadugu Hills, 125 Ft Saibaba statue so many Hindu temples also church and Masjid. Best Animal Market
