= Pulicherla, Nalgonda district =

Pulicherla
- village
- Country: India
- State: Telangana
- District: Nalgonda
- Talukas: Nagarajun Sagar

Languages
  - Official: Telugu
- Time zone: UTC+5:30 (IST)
- PIN: 508266
- Telephone code: 91-8585
- controversial uranium mines are located near to pulicherla at peddagattu (which comes under pulicherla village)

Pulicherla is a village and a Mandal in Nalgonda district in the state of Telangana in India. Pulicherla is a large village located in Peddavoora mandal of Nalgonda district, Telangana with total 1037 families residing. The Pulicherla village has population of 4148 of which 2075 are males while 2073 are females as per Population Census 2011.

== Schools ==
- ZP Primary School
- ZPHS (High School)- ZPHS School has a Library with almost 700+ plus books. FACTSET SYSTEMS INDIA PVT LTD supported to set up Library
- Montessori school
- Sri Saraswathi Vidya Nilayam Estd:1991

Founder: Dr.MASNA VENUGOPAL M.A(History/Sociology/Political Science) M.Ed, LL.M, PhD
