= Marriguda =

- Location in Telangana, India Marriguda (India)
- Coordinates: 16°59′47″N 78°51′30″E
- Country: India
- State: Telangana
- District: Nalgonda

Area
  - Total: 6.51 km^{2} (2.51 sq mi)

Population (2011)
  - Total: 3,603
  - Density: 553/km^{2} (1,430/sq mi)

Languages
  - Official: Telugu
- Time zone: UTC+5:30 (IST)
- PIN: 508245
- Vehicle registration: TS
- Website: telangana.gov.in

Marriguda is a village in Nalgonda district of the Indian state of Telangana. It is located in Marriguda mandal of Devarakonda division.
