= Saidabad, Nalgonda district =

Saidabad
- Village
- Country: India
- State: Telangana

Languages
  - Official: Telugu
- Time zone: UTC+5:30 (IST)

Saidabad is a village in Nalgonda district in Telangana, India. It falls under Choutuppal mandal.
