= Nomula, Nalgonda district =

Nomula
- village
- Location in Telangana, India
- Coordinates: 17.0600°N 79.3°E
- Country: India
- State: Telangana
- District: Nalgonda
- Elevation: 17.0700 m (56.004 ft)

Population (December 2010)
  - Total: 6,000

Languages
  - Official: Telugu
- Time zone: UTC+5:30 (IST)
- PIN: 508211
- Telephone code: 08682

Nomula is a village and a Gram panchayat of Nalgonda mandal, Nalgonda district, in Telangana state.
