= Nampally, Nalgonda district =

Nampally
- Location in Telangana, India Nampally (India)
- Coordinates: 16°53′12″N 78°57′48″E
- Country: India
- State: Telangana
- District: Nalgonda

Area
  - Total: 14.53 km^{2} (5.61 sq mi)

Population (2011)
  - Total: 3,784
  - Density: 260.4/km^{2} (674.5/sq mi)

Languages
  - Official: Telugu
- Time zone: UTC+5:30 (IST)
- Postal code: 508373
- Vehicle registration: TS
- Website: telangana.gov.in

Nampally is a village in Nalgonda district of the Indian state of Telangana. It is the headquarters of Nampally Mandal of Devarakonda division. Nampally mandal had 30 villages under it. The famous hindu temple Chalidona LaxmiNarasimha Swami temple is just 8.5 km far away from the mandal headquarters.

Here is the link for temple

https://www.youtube.com/watch?v=8aoIwm3CkY8
