= Chityal, Nalgonda district =

Chityal
- Municipality
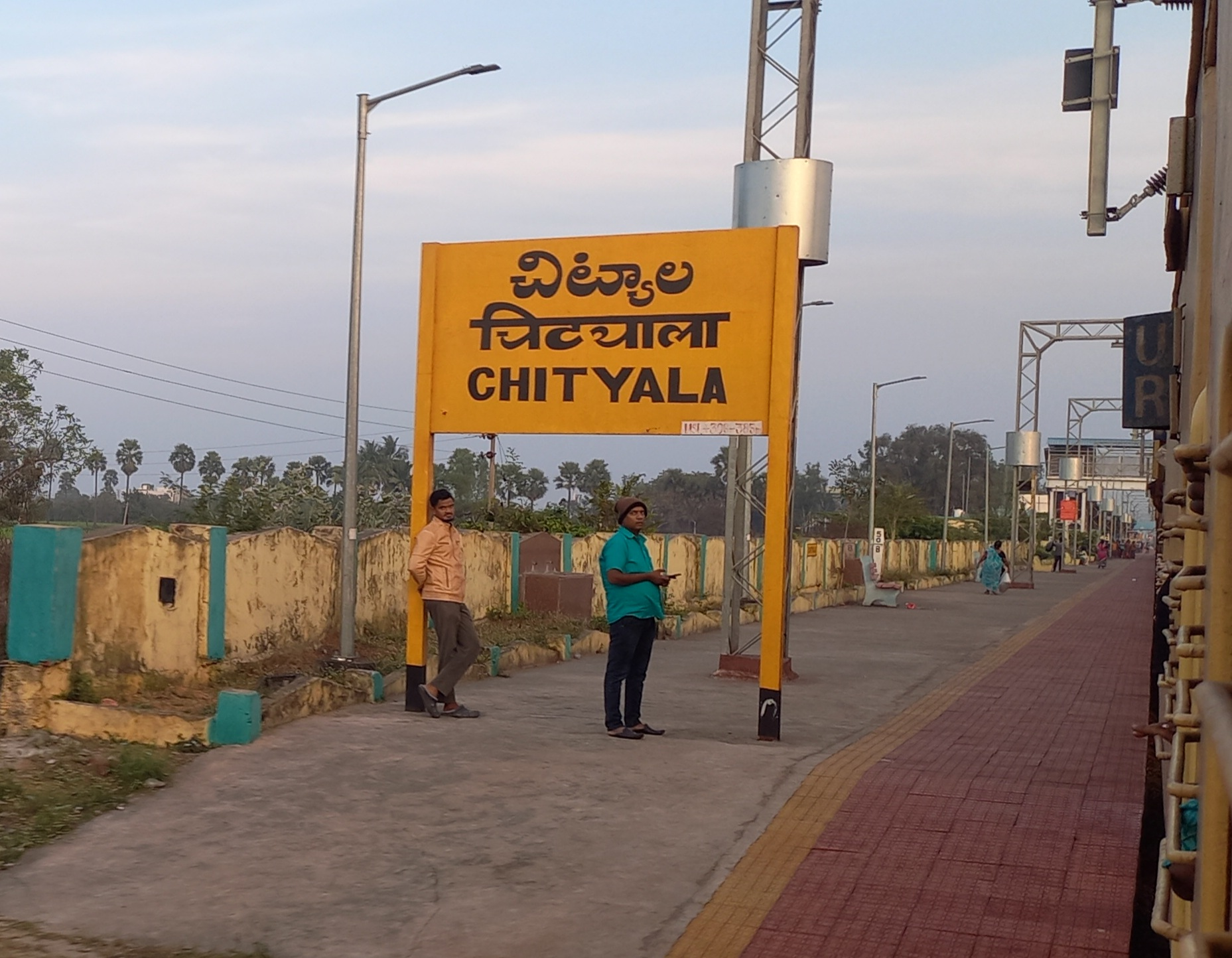
- Chityala railway station

- Location in Telangana, India Chityal (India)
- Coordinates: 17.2333°N 79.1333°E
- Country: India
- State: Telangana
- District: Nalgonda
- Talukas: Nakrekal

Government
  - MP: KV Reddy Bhuvanagiri

Area
  - Total: 17.43 km^{2} (6.73 sq mi)

Population (2011)
  - Total: 13,752
  - Density: 789.0/km^{2} (2,043/sq mi)

Languages
  - Official: Telugu
- Time zone: UTC+5:30 (IST)
- Postal code: 508114
- Vehicle registration: TG
- Lok Sabha constituency: Bhuvanagiri
- Vidhan Sabha constituency: Nakrekal
- Website: telangana.gov.in

Chityal is a municipality in Nalgonda district of the Indian state of Telangana. It is located in Chityal mandal of Nalgonda division. 74 km from Hyderabad.

== Geography ==
Chityal is located at 17.2333°N 79.1333°E. It has an average elevation of 304 metres (1000 ft). It is around 72 km from Hyderabad, 28 km from Nalgonda.

== History ==
In Kakatiya Dynasty, Chityala named Chittala Sangyapuram. The details of this are available in Gram Panchayat Office. In 1984, for laying railway track the inscription pillar found along with 800-year-old Anjaneya Swami Temple.

== Nearest Cities ==
Nalgonda-27 km

Suryapet-61 km

Hyderabad-74 km
