= Atmakur (M), Yadadri Bhuvanagiri district =

Atmakur (M)
- Mandal
- Location in Telangana, India
- Coordinates: 17°28′08″N 79°08′20″E
- Country: India
- State: Telangana
- District: Yadadri Bhuvanagiri
- Mandal: Atmakur (M) ZPTC -- K.Narendhar Gupta (INC)

Government
  - Type: Panchayati raj
  - Body: Atmakur gram panchayat

Area
  - Total: 2,486 ha (6,140 acres)

Population (2011)
  - Total: 5,960
  - Density: 240/km^{2} (621/sq mi)

Languages
  - Established: Telugu
- Time zone: UTC+5:30 (IST)
- PIN: 508111
- Area code: +91–8685
- Vehicle registration: TG 30

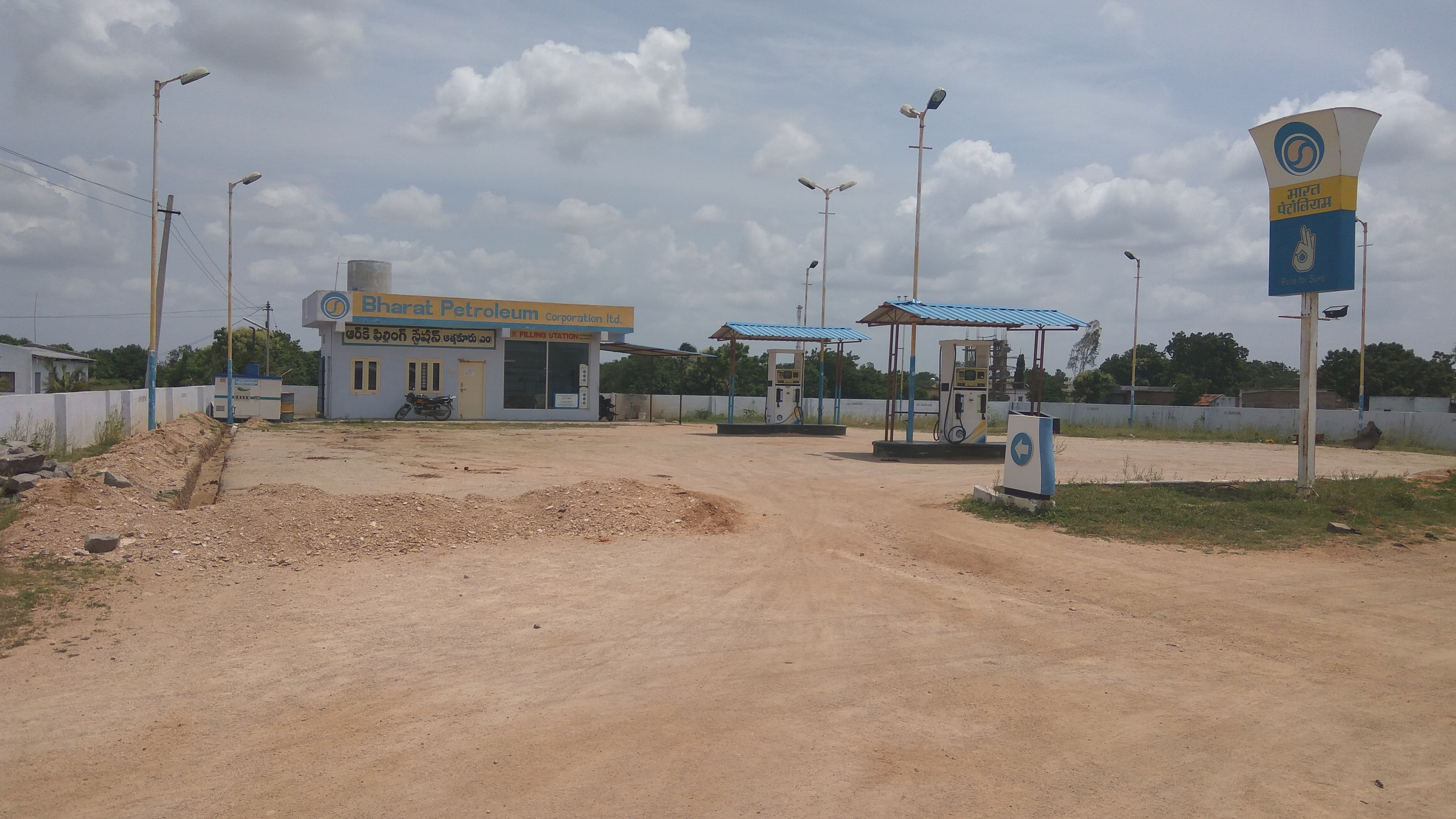
Petrol Bank in Atmakur (M)

Atmakur(M) is a Mandal in Yadadri Bhuvanagiri district of the Indian state of Telangana. It is located in Bhongir revenue division.

== Governance ==
Atmakur gram panchayat is the local self-government of the village.
