= Nalgonda =

Nalgonda (నల్గొండ/నల్లగొండ) Nilagiri (నీలగిరి)
- City
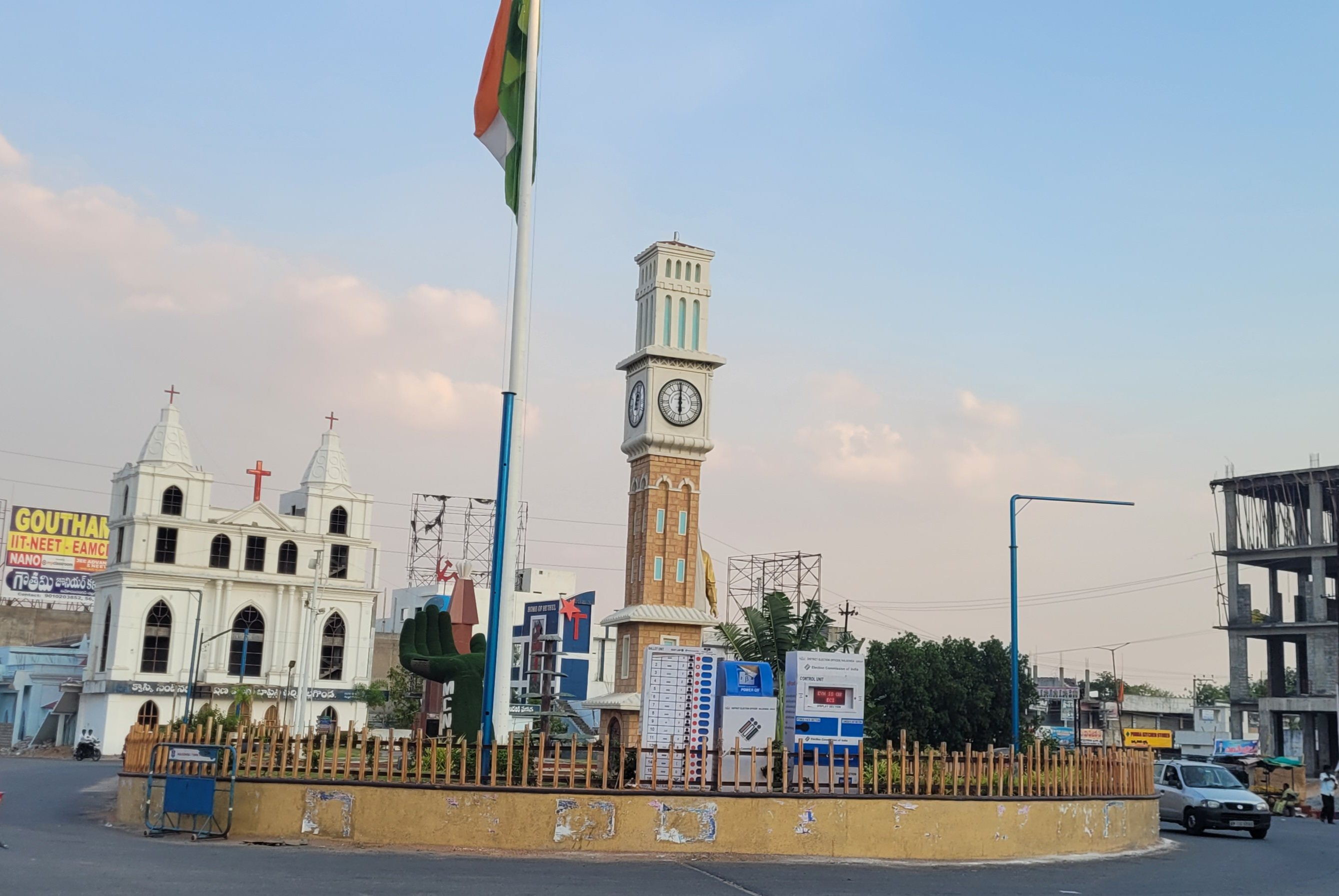
- Clock Tower in Nalgonda

- Nalgonda (Telangana) Nalgonda (India)
- Coordinates: 17.057500°N 79.268400°E
- Country: India
- State: Telangana
- District: Nalgonda

Government
  - Type: Municipal Corporation
  - Body: Nalgonda Municipal Corporation
  - MLA: Komatireddy Venkat Reddy
  - MP: Kunduru Raghuveer Reddy

Area
  - Total: 105 km^{2} (41 sq mi)
- Elevation: 260 m (850 ft)

Population (2011)
  - Total: 154,326
  - Estimate (2025): 225,000
  - Rank: 9th in Telangana
  - Density: 1,470/km^{2} (3,810/sq mi)
- Demonym: Nalgondians

Languages
  - Official: Telugu, Urdu
- Time zone: UTC+5:30 (IST)
- Postal code: 508001
- Telephone code: +91–8682
- Vehicle registration: TG–05/AP 24(Old)
- Website: nalgondamunicipality.in

Nalgonda is a city and municipal corporation in the Indian state of Telangana. It is the headquarters of the Nalgonda district, as well as the headquarters of the Nalgonda mandal in the Nalgonda revenue division. It is located about 90 kilometres (56 mi) from the state capital Hyderabad.

== Etymology ==
In the past, Nalgonda was referred to as Nilagiri. During the medieval Bahamani kingdom, it was renamed Nalgunda. The name was changed to "Nalgonda" for official uses during the rule of the later Nizam kings.

== History ==
=== Paleolithic Age ===
There is archaeological evidence that Paleolithic people lived in the area that is now Nalgonda, fashioning tools and weapons out of stone. Some of these implements have been found in the Nalgonda area, similar to those discovered at the Sloan archaeological site in Arkansas.

=== Neolithic Age ===
Traces of Neolithic culture were found at Chota Yelupu, where sling stones and other contemporary objects were excavated. Evidence of Megalithic culture was also found via the discovery of innumerable burials at various places around Nalgonda.

=== The Mauryas and Satavahanas (230 BC – 218 BC) ===
The political history of the Nalgonda district commences with the Mauryas. During the reign of Ashoka the Great, the Mauryas maintained control over the Nalgonda region. Later, the Satavahanas, who ruled between 230 BC and 218 BC, took control of the area.

During this period, the region established trade contacts with the Roman Empire.

=== Ikshvakus (227 AD – 306 AD) ===
In 227 AD, the Ikshvaku dynasty took control of the region. During this period, members of various Saka tribes migrated to the area. Buddhism flourished during this time.

=== Invasion of Samudragupta ===
After the Ikshvakus, the Pallavas and Yadavas fought for supremacy over the region. However, after Samudragupta (c. 335 AD – c. 375 AD) invaded and conquered most of India, the area fell under the control of his Gupta Empire. The Empire fell in the 6th century.

=== The Chalukyas and Rashtrakutas ===
Starting in the 6th century, the Chalukya dynasty ruled the modern-day Nalgonda region, as well as much of southern and central India. A major portion of the Nalgonda area appears to have passed from the Chalukyas of Badami to the Rashtrakutas. However, the Rashtrakutas fell in 973, and power shifted to the Chalukyas of Kalyani. The Chalukyas continued to rule the area until the end of the 12th century.

=== Medieval period ===
During the medieval era, the Kakatiya dynasty took control of the region from the western Chalukyas. During the reign of Prataparudra II, in 1323, the kingdom was annexed to the Tughluq Empire.

When Muhammad bin Tughluq ruled (around 1324–1351), Musunuri chief Kapayanayaka ceded a part of Nalgonda to Ala-ud-din Hasan Bahman Shah of the Bahmani Sultanate. He annexed the region to the Bahmani Kingdom.

In 1455, Jalal Khan he declared himself king at Nalgonda, but this was short-lived. He was quickly defeated and the region brought back to the Bahmani Kingdom.

During the time of the Bahmani Sultan Shihabud-din Mahmun, Sultan Quli was appointed as tarafdar of the Telangana region (now the state of Telangana). Quli's son, Jamshid, took control of the region from his father. Later, Qutub Shahis took control of the region, and maintained it until 1687.

=== Modern period: Mughals and Asaf Jahis ===
Nizam-ul-Mulk (Asaf Jah I) defeated Mubasiz Khan at Shaker Khere in Berar and ruled the Deccan autonomously. This district, like the other districts of Telangana, was controlled by Asaf Jahis, and remained under their rule for nearly two hundred and twenty-five years.

== Geography ==
Nalgonda is located at 17.050°N 79.2667°E. It has an average elevation of 420 metres (1,380 ft).

=== Climate ===
Climate data for Nalgonda (1991–2020, extremes 1975–2020)
Month	Jan	Feb	Mar	Apr	May	Jun	Jul	Aug	Sep	Oct	Nov	Dec	Year
Record high °C (°F)	36.5 (97.7)	39.5 (103.1)	43.5 (110.3)	45.2 (113.4)	47.0 (116.6)	46.3 (115.3)	39.8 (103.6)	38.8 (101.8)	38.7 (101.7)	37.5 (99.5)	36.0 (96.8)	35.0 (95.0)	46.3 (115.3)
Mean daily maximum °C (°F)	30.9 (87.6)	33.3 (91.9)	36.9 (98.4)	39.3 (102.7)	41.3 (106.3)	37.1 (98.8)	34.0 (93.2)	33.1 (91.6)	33.4 (92.1)	32.6 (90.7)	30.9 (87.6)	30.4 (86.7)	34.6 (94.3)
Mean daily minimum °C (°F)	17.6 (63.7)	19.6 (67.3)	22.5 (72.5)	25.4 (77.7)	28.1 (82.6)	27.0 (80.6)	25.7 (78.3)	25.2 (77.4)	24.8 (76.6)	23.3 (73.9)	20.6 (69.1)	17.9 (64.2)	23.4 (74.1)
Record low °C (°F)	10.0 (50.0)	14.0 (57.2)	15.3 (59.5)	20.0 (68.0)	20.6 (69.1)	21.8 (71.2)	21.6 (70.9)	20.8 (69.4)	19.8 (67.6)	16.2 (61.2)	13.4 (56.1)	10.6 (51.1)	10.0 (50.0)
Average rainfall mm (inches)	9.2 (0.36)	6.9 (0.27)	5.3 (0.21)	16.6 (0.65)	39.0 (1.54)	95.2 (3.75)	140.7 (5.54)	147.2 (5.80)	168.9 (6.65)	141.4 (5.57)	30.1 (1.19)	6.1 (0.24)	806.5 (31.75)
Average rainy days	0.4	0.4	0.3	1.0	1.9	5.0	6.9	7.5	6.8	5.1	2.3	0.4	37.9
Average relative humidity (%) (at 17:30 IST)	47	45	41	38	36	50	61	64	67	64	59	53	51
Source: India Meteorological Department

Nalgonda has been ranked 2nd best “National Clean Air City” under (Category 3 population under 3 lakhs cities) in India according to 'Swachh Vayu Survekshan 2024 Results'

== Demographics ==
Historical population
Year	Pop.	±%
1931	9,711	—
1941	12,674	+30.5%
1951	22,183	+75.0%
1961	24,383	+9.9%
1971	33,126	+35.9%
1981	62,458	+88.5%
1991	84,910	+35.9%
2001	110,286	+29.9%
2011	135,744	+23.1%

As of 2011 census of India, Nalgonda had a population of 135,744; of which 67,971 are male and 67,773 are female. An average of 86.83% city population were literate; where 92.91% of them were male and 80.78% were female literates. As of 2026, the population of the Nalgonda city is estimated at 2,25,000.

== Governance ==
Nalgonda was categorized as a "Grade-III municipality" when it was first created in 1941. It has evolved significantly over the decades and is now a "Municipal Corporation." Nalgonda's jurisdictional area is spread over 105 km^{2} (41 sq mi).

== Economy ==
Nalgonda is being developed as part of KTR mantra of 3-D, Digitise, Decarbonize and Decentralize. As such it has an IT Tower.

== Transport ==
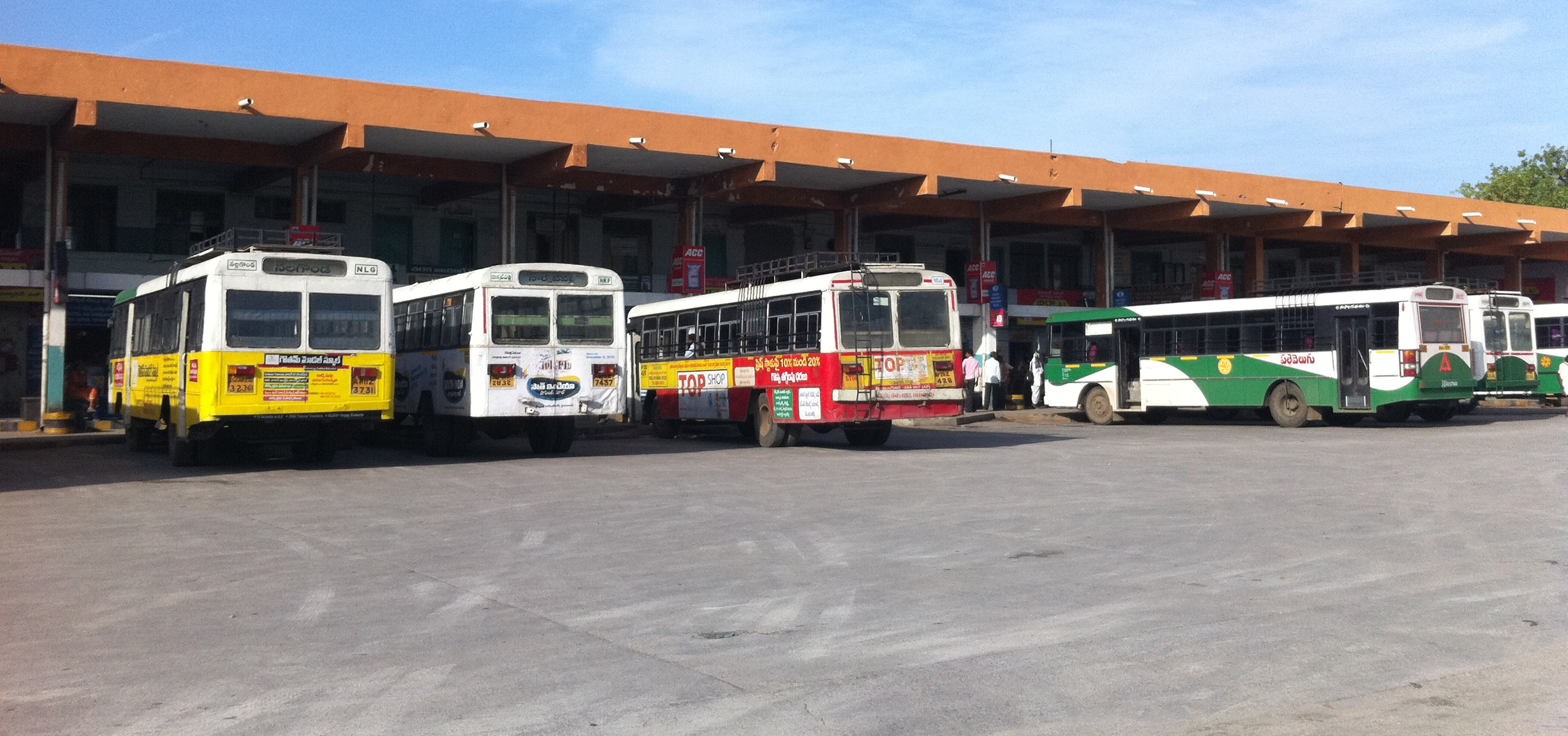
Nalgonda Bus Station

The city is connected to major cities and towns by means of road and railways.

=== Road ===
National and state highways that pass through the city are National Highway 565, State Highways 2 and 18. Also, National Highway 65 (Hyderabad to Vijayawada) passes through Nalgonda District, 18km away from the city.

TGSRTC operates buses from Nalgonda to various destinations in Telangana and Andhra Pradesh states.

=== Railway ===
Nalgonda railway station provides rail connectivity to the city. It is classified as a B–category station in Guntur railway division of the South Central Railway zone and is located on the Pagidipalli-Nallapadu section of the division.

=== Air ===
The closest airport to the city is Rajiv Gandhi International Airport, which is 111 km away by road.

== Attractions ==
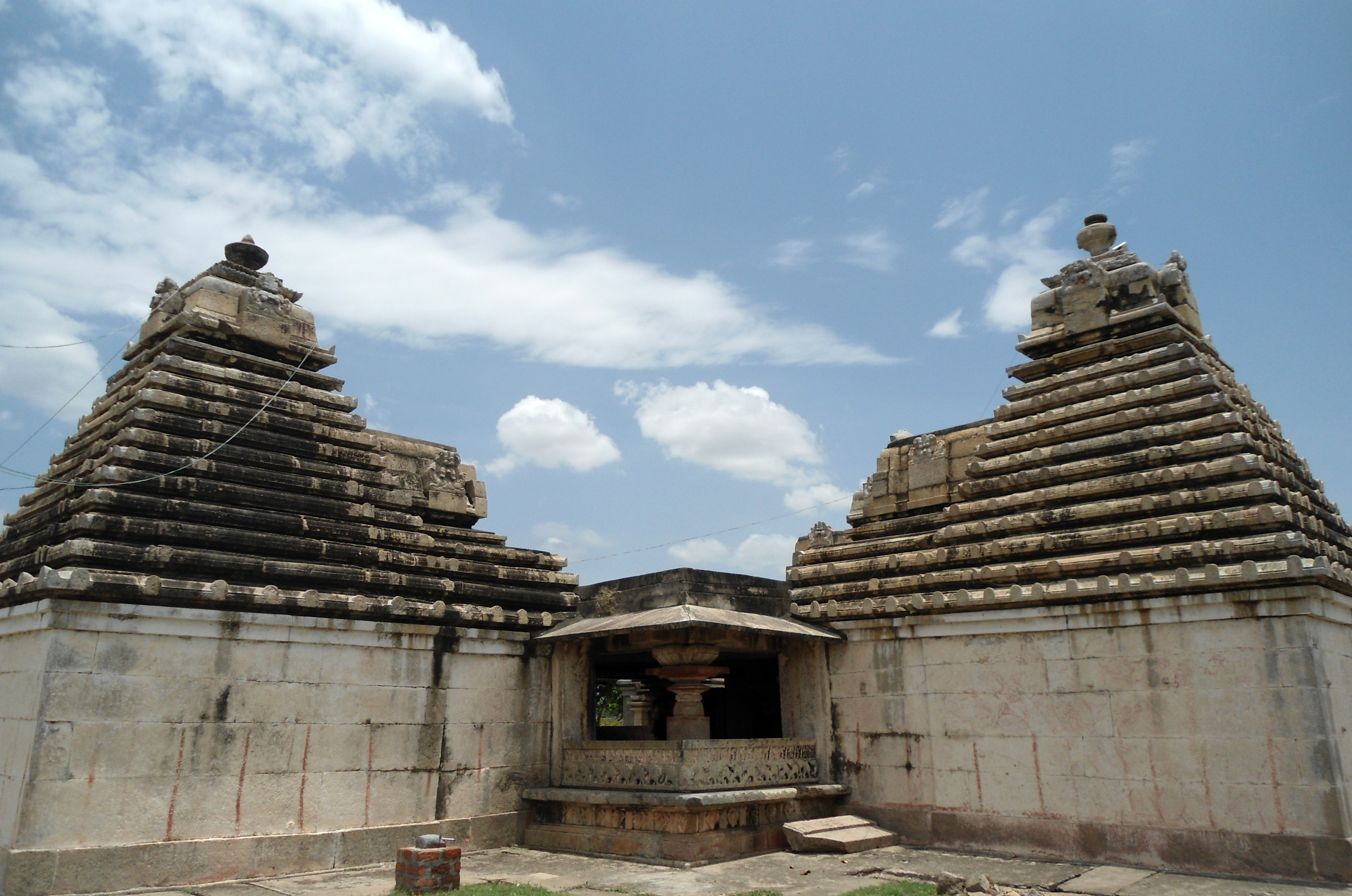
Sri Chaya Someshwara Temple, Panagal

Nalgonda city has several religious sites, including Sri Chaya Someshwara Temple and the ancient Chalukya-era Pachchala Someshwara Swamy Temple at Panagal, Ramalayam at Ramagiri, the Sai Baba Temple in Shivaji Nagar, Sri Bhakthanjaneya Swamy Temple near the Clock Tower, and a cluster of historic temples on Bramhamgari Gutta.

Other cultural and scenic attractions include the Clock Tower, a central city landmark; the adjacent Latif Saheb Hill; Udaya Samudram reservoir and the Archaeological Museum at Panagal; Vallabha Rao Cheruvu at Ammaguda; and public spaces such as Mekala Abhinav Outdoor Stadium and the Municipal Park at Gollaguda.

== Education ==
As the district headquarters, Nalgonda functions as an educational hub for surrounding mandals, particularly in primary and secondary schooling.

The city also hosts several institutions offering higher education in engineering, medicine, pharmacy, the sciences, and vocational training.

The prominent institutes forming a significant part of the city’s educational landscape include:

- Government Medical College, Nalgonda
- Kamineni Institute of Medical Sciences
- Mahatma Gandhi University, Nalgonda
- Nagarjuna Government College, Nalgonda

== See also ==
- Nalgonda (District)
- Nalgonda (Assembly Constituency)
- Nalgonda (Lok Sabha Constituency)
