= Bibinagar =

- Census Town
- Location in Telangana, India
- Coordinates: 17°28′14.82″N 78°47′40.68″E
- Country: India
- State: Telangana
- District: Y.Bhuvanagiri
- Mandal: Bibinagar

Government
  - Type: Grama Panchayat
  - Body: Bibinagar Grama Panchayat

Area
  - Total: 11.12 km^{2} (4.29 sq mi)

Population (2011)
  - Total: 8,320
  - Density: 748/km^{2} (1,940/sq mi)

Languages
  - Official: Telugu
- Time zone: UTC+5:30 (IST)
- PIN: 508126
- Area code: +91–8685
- Vehicle registration: TG 30

Bibinagar is a mandal of Bhongir revenue division in Yadadri Bhuvanagiri district of the Indian state of Telangana. It is the site of the All India Institute of Medical Sciences, Bibinagar.

== Governance ==
Bibinagar Grama panchayat is the local self-government.
