= Nalgonda revenue division =

Coordinates: 17.1415°N 79.6236°E

- Country: India
- State: Telangana
- District: Nalgonda

Nalgonda revenue division (or Nalgonda division) is an administrative division in the Nalgonda district of the Indian state of Telangana. It is one of the 4 revenue divisions in the district which consists of 9mandals under its administration. Nalgonda is the divisional headquarters of the division. The revenue division got modified on 11 October 2011, based on the re-organisation of the districts in the state.

== Administration ==
The mandals in the division are:

Mandals	Chityal, Kanagal, Kattangoor, Kethepally, Nakrekal, Nalgonda, Narketpally, Shaligouraram, Thipparthy

== See also ==
- List of revenue divisions in Telangana
- List of mandals in Telangana
