= Devarakonda Assembly constituency =

Constituency of the Telangana legislative assembly in India

Coordinates: 16.69°N 78.92°E

Devarakonda
- Constituency No. 86 for the Telangana Legislative Assembly
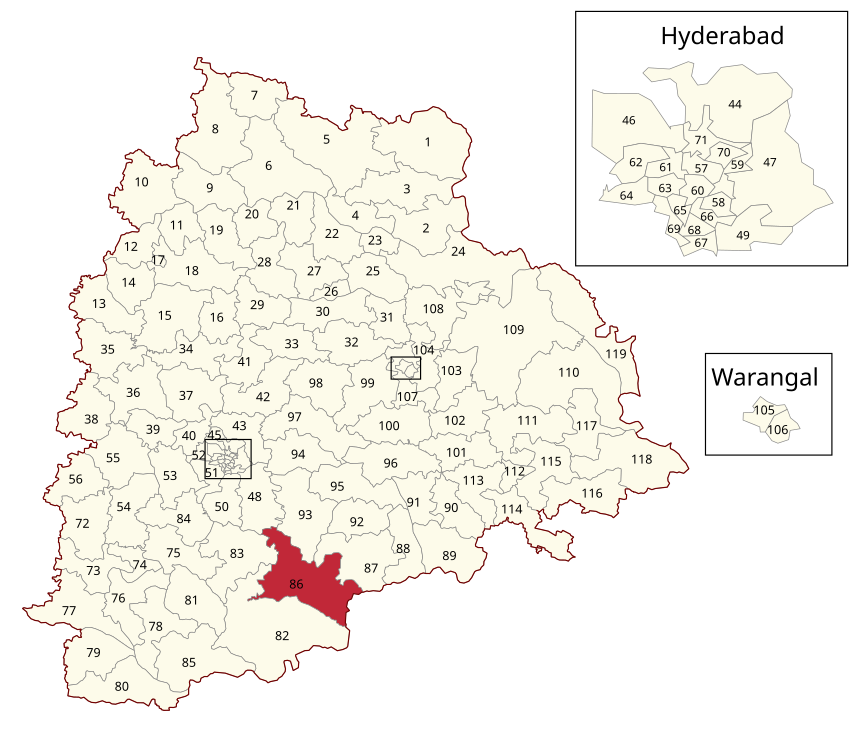
- Location of Devarakonda Assembly constituency within Telangana

Constituency details
- Country: India
- Region: South India
- State: Telangana
- District: Nalgonda
- Lok Sabha constituency: Nalgonda
- Established: 1951
- Total electors: 2,11,773
- Reservation: ST

Member of Legislative Assembly
- 3rd Telangana Legislative Assembly
- Incumbent Nenavath Balu Naik
- Party: INC
- Elected year: 2023

Devarakonda Assembly constituency is a ST reserved constituency of the Telangana Legislative Assembly, India. It is one of 12 constituencies in the erstwhile Nalgonda district. It is part of Nalgonda Lok Sabha constituency.

Ravindra Kumar, the MLA of TRS in Telangana Legislative Assembly is representing the constituency.

== Mandals ==
The Assembly Constituency presently comprises the following Mandals:

Mandal
Devarakonda
Chintapally
Chandampet
Gundlapally
Pedda Adiserlapally
Neredugommu
Kondamallepally

Gudipally

== Members of the Legislative Assembly ==
Duration	Member	Political party
Hyderabad State
1952-57	K. Anantha Rama Rao	People's Democratic Front
Andhra Pradesh
1957-62	M. Laxma rao	Indian National Congress
1962-67	Pedda Rao	Communist Party of India
1967-72	G. P. N. Reddy	Indian National Congress
1972-78	Boddupally Rama Sharma	Communist Party of India
1978-83	Dharavath Ravinder Naik	Indian National Congress
1983-85	Dharavath Ravinder Naik	Indian National Congress
1985-89	Mood Baddhu Chowhan	Communist Party of India
1989-94	Mood Baddhu Chowhan	Communist Party of India
1994-99	Mood Baddhu Chowhan	Communist Party of India
1999-02	Dheeravath Raghya Naik	Indian National Congress
2002-04	Deeravath Bharathi	Indian National Congress
2004-09	Ravindra Kumar Ramavath	Communist Party of India
2009-14	Nenavath Balu Naik	Indian National Congress
Telangana
2014-18	Ravindra Kumar Ramavath	Communist Party of India
2018-2023	Ravindra Kumar Ramavath	Telangana Rashtra Samithi
2023-Present	Nenavath Balu Naik	Indian National Congress

== Election results ==
=== Telangana Legislative Assembly election, 2023 ===
Telangana Assembly Elections, 2023: Devarakonda (Assembly constituency)
Party	Candidate	Votes	%	±%
INC	Nenavath Balu Naik	111,344	52.06	
BRS	Ravindra Kumar Ramavath	81,232	38.02	
BJP	Kethavath Lalu Naik	9,815	4.59	
BSP	Dr. Mudavath Venkatesh Chowhan	4,017	1.88	
NOTA	None of the Above	1,613	0.75	
Majority		30,021	14.04	
Turnout		2,13,881		
INC gain from BRS		Swing		

=== Telangana Legislative Assembly election, 2018 ===
2018 Telangana Legislative Assembly election: Devarakonda (Assembly constituency)
Party	Candidate	Votes	%	±%
TRS	Ravindra Kumar Ramavath	96,454	51.97%	
INC	Nenavath Balu Naik	57,606	31.04%	
BSP	Bheelya Naik Kethavath	19,350	10.43%	
BJP	GOPI @ KALYAN NAIK	3,152	1.70	
NOTA	None of the Above	1,695	0.91	
Majority		38,848	21.1%	
Turnout		1,85,584	86.24	
TRS gain from CPI		Swing		

=== Telangana Legislative Assembly election, 2014 ===
Telangana Assembly Elections, 2014: Devarakonda (Assembly constituency)
Party	Candidate	Votes	%	±%
CPI	Ravindra Kumar Ramavath	57,717	35.9%	
TDP	Bheelya Naik Kethavath	53,501	33.3%	
TRS	Kethavath Lalu	38,618	24.0%	
CPI(M)	Dheeravath Ravi	5,791	3.6%	
Majority		4,216		
Turnout		1,61,940	76.5%	
CPI gain from INC		Swing		

=== Andhra Pradesh Legislative Assembly election, 2009 ===
AP Assembly Elections, 2009: Devarakonda (Assembly constituency)
Party	Candidate	Votes	%	±%
INC	Balu Naik Nenavath	64,887	44.1%	
CPI	Ravindra Kumar Ramavath	57,419	39.0%	
PRP	Vadtya Ramesh	16,428	11.2%	
BJP	Mangya Pathlavath	3,478	2.4%	
Majority		7,468	5.1%	
Turnout		1,47,283	72.7%	
INC gain from		Swing		

=== Andhra Pradesh Legislative Assembly election, 2004 ===
Andhra pradesh Assembly Elections, 2004: Devarakonda (Assembly constituency)
Party	Candidate	Votes	%	±%
CPI	Ravindra Kumar Ramavath	61,748		
TDP	Vadthya Shakru Naik	44,561		
Majority		17,187		
Turnout				
Communist Party Of India gain from INC		Swing		

=== Andhra Pradesh Legislative Assembly election, 1999 ===
Andhra pradesh Assembly Elections, 1999: Devarakonda (Assembly constituency)
Party	Candidate	Votes	%	±%
INC	RAGHYA NAIK DHEERAVATH	46,294	40.32%	
TDP	NENAVATH VASHYA NAIK	45,907	39.98%	
Communist Party Of India	MOOD BADDU CHOWHAN	22,436	19.54%	
Majority		1,733		
Turnout		1,14,816	72.18%	
INC gain from		Swing		

=== Andhra Pradesh Legislative Assembly election, 1994 ===
Andhra pradesh Assembly Elections, 1994: Devarakonda (Assembly constituency)
Party	Candidate	Votes	%	±%
Communist Party Of India	MOOD BADDU CHOWHAN	56,630	53.75%	
Independent	RAGHYA NAIK DHEERAVATH	33,557	31.85%	
INC	RAMAVATH SHANKAR NAIK	9,397	8.92%	
BJP	BADYA NAIK NENAVATH	2,235	2.12%	
Independent	BHOOKYA VIJAYA LAXMI	1,998	1.90%	
BSP	VADTHYA RAMESH	990		
Majority		23,073		
Turnout		1,05,366	66.59%	
Communist Party Of India gain from		Swing		

== See also ==
- List of constituencies of Telangana Legislative Assembly
- Devarakonda
