= Nakrekal Assembly constituency =

Constituency of the Telangana legislative assembly in India

Coordinates: 17.17°N 79.43°E

Nakrekal
- Constituency No. 95 for the Telangana Legislative Assembly
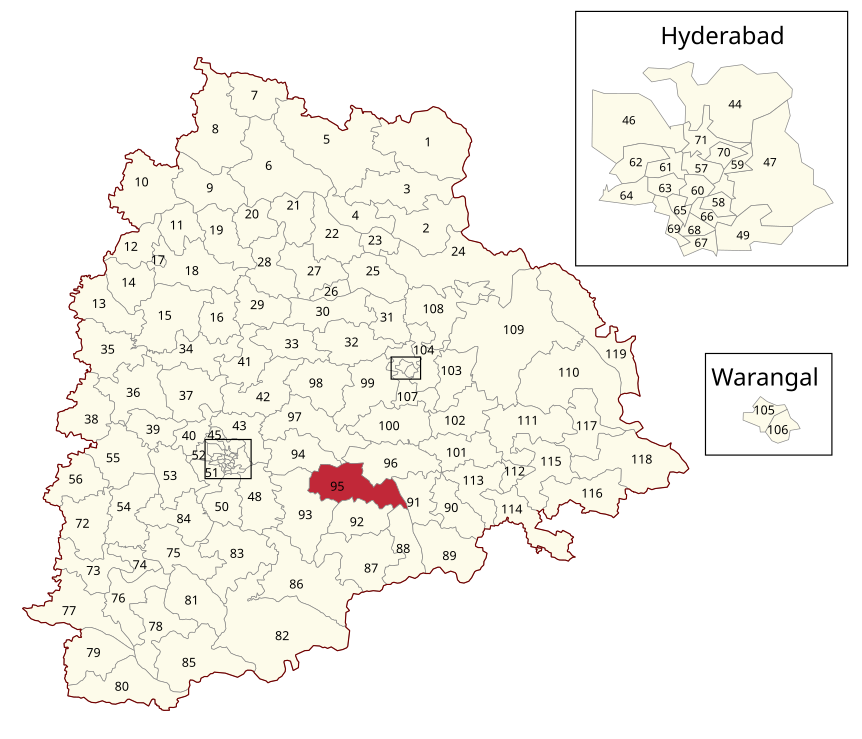
- Location of Nakrekal Assembly constituency within Telangana

Constituency details
- Country: India
- Region: South India
- State: Telangana
- District: Nalgonda
- Lok Sabha constituency: Bhongir
- Established: 1957
- Total electors: 2,33,620
- Reservation: SC

Member of Legislative Assembly
- 3rd Telangana Legislative Assembly
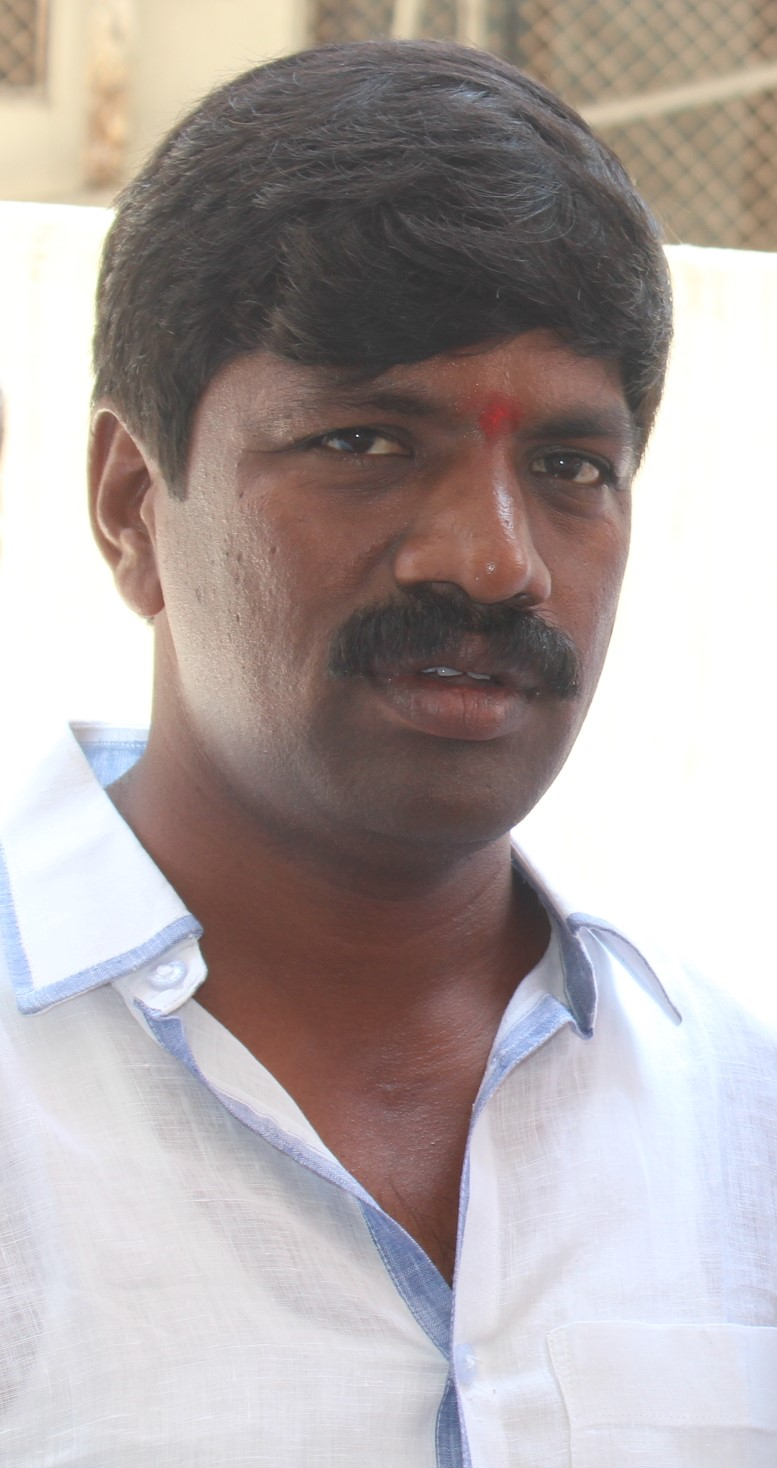
- Incumbent Vemula Veeresham
- Party: Indian National Congress
- Elected year: 2023

Nakrekal Assembly constituency is a SC (Scheduled Caste) reserved constituency of the Telangana Legislative Assembly, India. It is one of 12 constituencies in Nalgonda district. It is part of Bhongir Lok Sabha constituency.

Vemula Veeresham of Indian National Congress is currently representing the constituency.

== Mandals ==
The Assembly Constituency presently comprises the following Mandals:

| Mandal | District |
|---|---|
| Nakrekal | Nalgonda |
| Kethepally | Nalgonda |
| Kattangoor | Nalgonda |
| Chityal | Nalgonda |
| Ramannapeta | Yadadri Bhuvanagiri |
| Narketpally | Nalgonda |

== Members of Legislative Assembly ==
| Year | MLA | Party |
Andhra Pradesh
| 1957 | B. Dharma Biksham | People's Democratic Front |
| 1962 | Nandyala Srinivasa Reddy | Communist Party of India |
| 1967 | Narra Raghava Reddy | Communist Party of India (Marxist) |
| 1972 | Musapota Kamalamm | Indian National Congress |
| 1978 | Narra Raghava Reddy | Communist Party of India (Marxist) |
| 1983 | Narra Raghava Reddy | Communist Party of India (Marxist) |
| 1985 | Narra Raghava Reddy | Communist Party of India (Marxist) |
| 1989 | Narra Raghava Reddy | Communist Party of India (Marxist) |
| 1994 | Narra Raghava Reddy | Communist Party of India (Marxist) |
| 1999 | Nomula Narsimhaiah | Communist Party of India (Marxist) |
| 2004 | Nomula Narsimhaiah | Communist Party of India (Marxist) |
| 2009 | Chirumarthi Lingaiah | Indian National Congress |
Telangana
| 2014 | Vemula Veeresham | Telangana Rashtra Samithi |
| 2018 | Chirumarthi Lingaiah | Indian National Congress |
| 2023 | Vemula Veeresham | Indian National Congress |

== Election results ==
=== Telangana Legislative Assembly election, 2023 ===
Telangana Assembly Elections, 2023: Nakrekal (Assembly constituency)
| Party | Candidate | Votes | % | ±% |
|---|---|---|---|---|
| INC | Vemula Veeresham | 133,540 | 60.97 | |
| BRS | Chirumarthi Lingaiah | 64,701 | 29.54 | |
| BJP | Nakirekanti Mogulaiah | 5,668 | 2.59 | |
| CPI(M) | Chinnavenkulu Bojja | 3,238 | 1.48 | |
| BSP | Medi Priyadarshini | 2,603 | 1.19 | |
| NOTA | None of the Above | 969 | 0.44 | |
| Majority | | 68,839 | 31.43 | |
| Turnout | | 2,19,033 | | |
| INC hold | | Swing | | |

=== Telangana Legislative Assembly election, 2018 ===
2018 Telangana Legislative Assembly election: Nakrekal
| Party | Candidate | Votes | % | ±% |
|---|---|---|---|---|
| INC | Chirumarthi Lingaiah | 93,699 | 46.33% | |
| TRS | Vemula Veeresham | 85,440 | 42.25% | |
| SFB | Dubba Ravi Kumar | 10,383 | 5.13% | |
| CPI(M) | Jitta Nagesh | 4,543 | 2.25% | |
| BJP | Kasarla Lingaiah | 2,233 | 1.10% | |
| NOTA | None of the Above | 1,331 | 0.66% | |
| Majority | | 8,259 | 4.08% | |
| Turnout | | 2,02,230 | 88.53% | |
| INC gain from TRS | | Swing | | |

=== Telangana Legislative Assembly election, 2014 ===
Telangana Assembly Elections, 2014: Nakrekal (Assembly constituency)
| Party | Candidate | Votes | % | ±% |
|---|---|---|---|---|
| TRS | Vemula Veeresham | 62,445 | 35.0% | |
| INC | Chirumarthi Lingaiah | 60,075 | 33.7% | |
| BJP | Cheruku Laxmi | 38,440 | 21.6% | |
| CPI(M) | Mamidi Sarvaiah | 12,741 | 7.1% | |
| Majority | | 2,370 | 1.3% | |
| Turnout | | 1,78,351 | 79.1% | |
| TRS gain from INC | | Swing | | |

== See also ==
- Nakrekal
- List of constituencies of Telangana Legislative Assembly
