= Kunduru Jana Reddy =

Indian politician (born 1946)

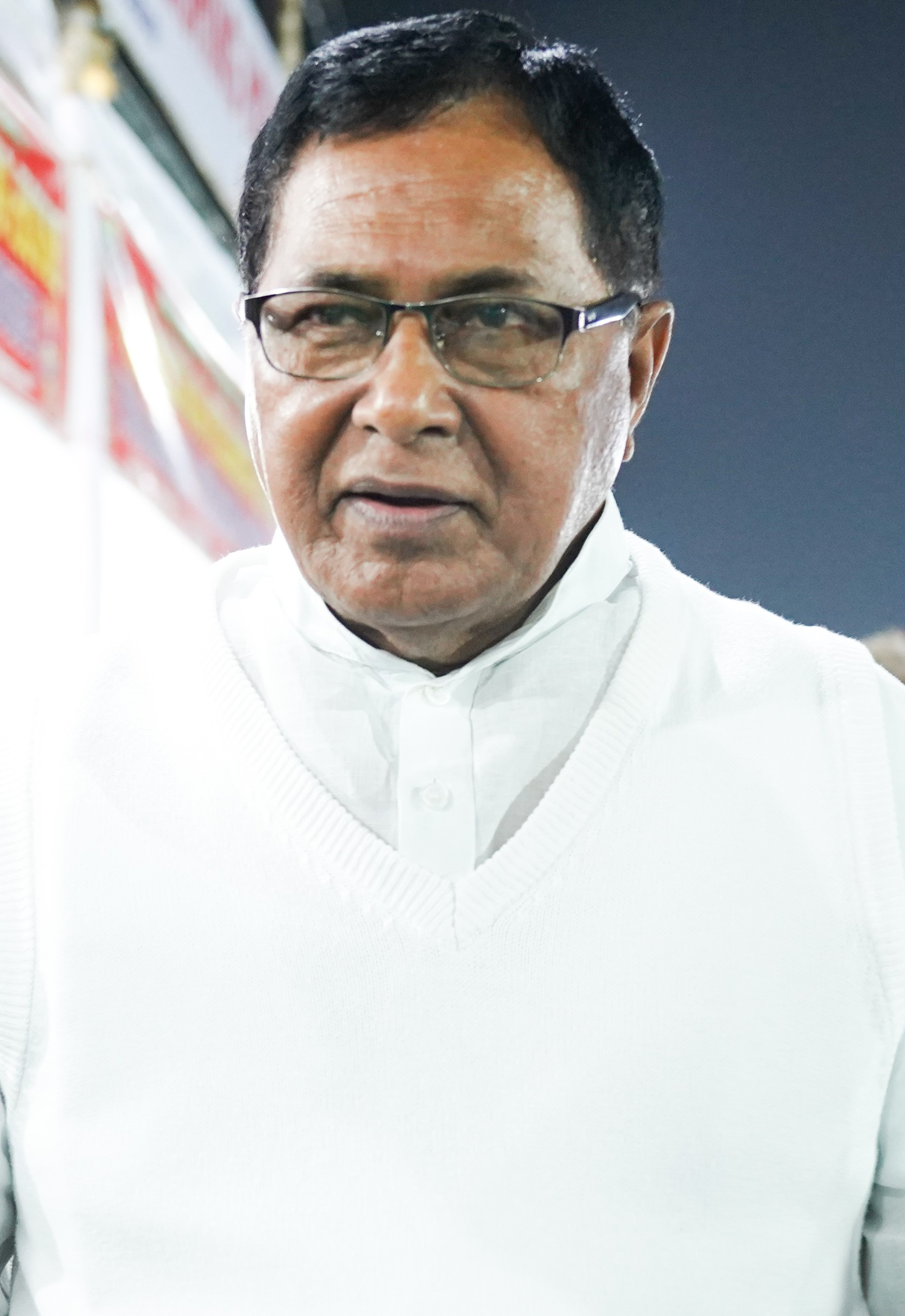
- Jana Reddy

1st Leader of Opposition Telangana Legislative Assembly
- In office 3 June 2014 – 11 December 2018
- Governor: E. S. L. Narasimhan
- Chief Minister: K. Chandrashekar Rao
- Preceded by: Office Established
- Succeeded by: Mallu Bhatti Vikramarka

1st Pro-tem Speaker Telangana Legislative Assembly
- In office 9 June 2014 – 10 June 2014
- Chief Minister: K. Chandrashekar Rao
- Preceded by: Office Established
- Succeeded by: Mumtaz Ahmed Khan

Member of Telangana Legislative Assembly
- In office 2 June 2014 – 11 December 2018
- Preceded by: Telangana Assembly Created
- Succeeded by: Nomula Narsimhaiah
- Constituency: Nagarjuna Sagar

Minister of Panchayati Raj & Rural water Supply Government of Andhra Pradesh
- In office 3 September 2009 – 21 February 2014
- Chief Minister: Konijeti Rosaiah; N. Kiran Kumar Reddy
- Preceded by: Botsa Satyanarayana
- Succeeded by: Himself
- Constituency: Nagarjuna Sagar

Minister of Home, Jails, Fire Service, sainik Welfare, Printing & stationery Government of Andhra Pradesh
- In office 14 May 2004 – 20 May 2009
- Governor: Surjit Singh Barnala; Sushilkumar Shinde; Rameshwar Thakur; N. D. Tiwari
- Chief Minister: Y. S. Rajasekhar Reddy
- Preceded by: Tulla Devender Goud
- Succeeded by: Sabitha Indra Reddy

Minister of Transport and Panchayati Raj Government of Andhra Pradesh
- In office 1985–1988
- Governor: Shankar Dayal Sharma
- Chief Minister: N. T. Rama Rao

Minister of Agriculture Government of Andhra Pradesh
- In office 1983–1988
- Governor: K. C. Abraham; Thakur Ramlal
- Chief Minister: N. T. Rama Rao

Member of Legislative Assembly Andhra Pradesh
- In office 2009–2014
- Preceded by: Constituency Established
- Succeeded by: Telangana Assembly Created
- Constituency: Nagarjuna Sagar
- In office 1999–2009
- Preceded by: G. Rama Murthy
- Succeeded by: Constituency Dissolved
- Constituency: Chalakurthi
- In office 1983–1994
- Preceded by: Ramulu Nimmala
- Succeeded by: G. Rama Murthy
- Constituency: Chalakurthi

Personal details
- Born: 20 June 1946 (age 80) Anumula village, Hyderabad State, British India (present day Anumula village, Nalgonda district, Telangana, India)
- Party: Indian National Congress (1988-present)
- Other party: Telugu Desam Party (1982-1988)
- Spouse: Sumathi
- Children: Kunduru Raghuveer, Jaiveer Reddy
- Education: H.S.C.

Kunduru Jana Reddy (born 20 June 1946) is an Indian politician. He was the leader of opposition in first Telangana Assembly and served as the Minister for Panchayat Raj & Rural Water Supply in the State of Andhra Pradesh during its term from 2009 to 2014. He was among the most prominent cabinet ministers of the ruling Indian National Congress (INC) and served as Minister for Home, Jails, Fire Service, Sainik Welfare, Printing & Stationery in the government led by the late former Chief Minister Dr Y. S. Rajasekhara Reddy from 2004 to 2009. In 2009 elections he won with a margin of 6214 votes against industrialist turned politician of TDP Chinappa Reddy Tera. In 2014 he won with a margin of 16558 votes over Nomula Narsimaiah of BRS in the year where Congress lost the majority vote. He lost the 1994 elections to TDP candidate Gundeboina Rammoorthy Yadav.

== Early life and politics ==
Jana Reddy was born in Anumula, a village near historic Nagarjuna Sagar in the Nalgonda district. His political career started by contesting 1978 state elections as JP candidate from Chalakurthi constituency then joined the Telugu Desam Party founded by Nandamuri Taraka Rama Rao, and was first elected to the State Legislature from the Chalakurthi constituency of the Nalgonda district in 1983. He was re-elected for seven terms to the Assembly from the Chalakurthi constituency, and went on to hold portfolios such as Agriculture, Co-operative, Marketing, Forest, Animal Husbandry, Fisheries, Weights & Measures, C.A.D., Transport, Roads & Buildings, Housing Panchayath Raj, Rural water scheme and Sanitation in the government of Andhra Pradesh. He is the longest serving cabinet minister in government of Telangana breaking the record of Sri Kasu Brahmanandha Reddy former chief minister of A.P.

Jana Reddy resigned from the Telugu Desam Party after differing with N.T. Rama Rao on expelling 30 cabinet ministers in 1988 and founded a political party - Telugu mahanadu which eventually merged with Congress on call given by then AICC president Rajiv Gandhi. He played an active role in reviving the Congress Party specifically in the Telangana Region to fight the then ruling Telugu Desam Party which lost the elections in 2004 to the Congress Party. Jana Reddy was sworn in as the Minister for Home Affairs in the 2004 AP Cabinet for his progressive contribution to the Congress Party.

Known for his vast experience spanning 30 years in AP state politics; Jana Reddy served as the Minister for Panchayati Raj & RWS - Andhra Pradesh, apart from being active in the Telangana movement and has led various delegations to All India Congress Committee (AICC) representing the Telangana Statehood issue.

== Political statistics ==
	Year	Contested for	Party	Constituency	Opponent	Votes	Majority	Result
1	1978	MLA	JNP	Chalakurthi	Ramulu Nimmala (INC(I))	18644 - 32820	-14176	Lost
2	1983	MLA	Independent	Chalakurthi	Ramulu Nimmala (INC)	39676 - 33746	5930	Won
3	1985	MLA	TDP	Chalakurthi	Dheeravath Ragya Naik (INC)	59113 - 30245	28868	Won
4	1989	MLA	INC	Chalakurthi	Peda Narsaiah Gopagani (TDP)	63231 - 48162	15069	Won
5	1994	MLA	INC	Chalakurthi	G. Rama Murthy (TDP)	62230 - 64851	-2621	Lost
6	1999	MLA	INC	Chalakurthi	G. Rama Murthy (TDP)	72649 - 52005	20644	Won
7	2004	MLA	INC	Chalakurthi	G. Rama Murthy (TDP)	80116 - 51344	28772	Won
8	2009	MLA	INC	Nagarjuna Sagar	Tera Chinnapa Reddy (TDP)	67958 - 61744	6214	Won
9	2014	MLA	INC	Nagarjuna Sagar	Nomula Narsimhaiah (TRS)	69684 - 53208	16476	Won
10	2018	MLA	INC	Nagarjuna Sagar	Nomula Narsimhaiah (TRS)	75884 - 83655	-7771	Lost
11	2021 by-election	MLA	INC	Nagarjuna Sagar	Nomula Bhagath (TRS)	70932 - 89804	-18872	Lost

Preceded by Botsa Satyanarayana	Minister for Panchayati Raj & RWS - Andhra Pradesh; 2010–2014	Succeeded by K. T. Rama Rao

Preceded by Tulla Devender Goud	Home Minister of Andhra Pradesh; 2004–2009	Succeeded by Sabitha Indra Reddy
