= Narra Raghava Reddy =

Indian politician

Member of Legislative Assembly Andhra Pradesh
- In office 1978–1999
- Preceded by: Musapota Kamalamm
- Succeeded by: Nomula Narsaiah
- Constituency: Nakrekal
- In office 1967–1972
- Preceded by: Nandyala Srinivasa Reddy
- Succeeded by: Musapota Kamalamm
- Constituency: Nakrekal

Personal details
- Born: 1924 Vattimarthy, Nalgonda, Telangana, India
- Died: 9 April 2015 (aged 90–91)
- Party: Communist Party of India (Marxist)
- Parent(s): Narra Ram Reddy, Kanakamma

Narra Raghava Reddy (1924–2015) was a leader of the Communist Party of India (Marxist), a six time MLA to Andhra Pradesh Assembly who represented Nakrekal constituency of Nalgonda district. He participated in Telangana Rebellion along with Ravi Narayana Reddy, Dharma Bixam and joined the CPI in 1950 and was elected as sarpanch of Shivanenigudem in 1959. After the split in the CPI, he went with the CPM. Raghava Reddy was jailed among the opposition leaders jailed by then Congress government during the emergency. He was elected state committee member of CPM in 1971 at the party meeting held in Warangal. He was elected as MLA of Nakrekal for six terms since 1967 elections. He won the elections as MLA from the constituency in 1972, 1978, 1984, 1989 and 1994. As the floor leader of the party in Assembly, Raghava Reddy raised a range of public issues and fought for the welfare of toddy tappers, gram sevaks and weavers. He died at the age of 92, in private hospital at Narketpally on 9 April 2015.
