= Kunduru Jayaveer Reddy =

Indian politician (born 1982)

Member of Telangana Legislative Assembly
- Incumbent
- Assumed office 3 Dec 2023
- Preceded by: Nomula Bhagath Yadav
- Constituency: Nagarjuna Sagar

Personal details
- Born: 1982 (age 43–44) Nalgonda, Telangana, India
- Party: Indian National Congress
- Relations: Kunduru Raghuveer (Brother)
- Parent: Kunduru Jana Reddy (father)
- Education: Post Graduate Master of Science in Financial Engineering
- Alma mater: Polytechnic Institute of New York University
- Occupation: Politician

Kunduru Jayaveer Reddy (born 1982) is an Indian politician from Telangana state. He is an MLA from Nagarjuna Sagar Assembly constituency in Nalgonda district. He represents Indian National Congress and won the 2023 Telangana Legislative Assembly election.

== Early life and education ==
Reddy is from Nagarjuna Sagar, Nalgonda district. He is born to Kunduru Jana Reddy. He completed his Master of Science in Financial Engineering in 2008 at Polytechnic Institute of New York, University of New York, United States.

== Career ==
Reddy won from Nagarjuna Sagar Assembly constituency representing Indian National Congress in the 2023 Telangana Legislative Assembly election. He polled 119,831 votes and defeated his nearest rival, Nomula Bhagath Kumar of Bharat Rashtra Samithi, by a huge margin of 44,849 votes.
