= Haliya, Telangana =

Municipal Council in Telangana, India

Haliya is a municipality located in Anumula mandal of Nalgonda district, Telangana, India. The population as per the 2011 census is 17371 and its extent is 42.84 km^{2}. It is situated 150 km away from the state capital of Telangana i.e., Hyderabad and is connected to Nagarjuna Sagar road. It is situated 34 km away from Dist. Headquarters Viz., Nalgonda and 31 km away from the division Miryalaguda. The River Krishna is passing by the side of Nagarjuna Sagar which is 25 km away from the town.

The Haliya is famous for the lord Ramalayam Temple. The town is well industrially developed and the largest rice milling centre in Asia having 22 parboiled Rice Industries and various small scale industries. It is an agriculture centre for paddy and is situated under the Command area of Nagarjuna Sagar Left Canal. Employment is generated through agriculture and industries.

The town is the main education centre in Mandal. Having 3 Junior Colleges, 10 High Schools and 21 Primary and upper primary schools in the town. There are (1) PHC & 11 others clinics, Dispensaries and Nursing Homes run by private Medical Practitioners.

Haliya Municipality is predominantly covered by residential areas followed by commercial, public semi-public offices and Cinema Halls, T.S.R.T.C Bus Stand Market yards.

Haliya Pincode is 508377
