= Nomula Narsimhaiah Yadav =

Indian politician (1956–2020)

Nomula Narsimhaiah

Member of legislative assembly
- In office 11 December 2018 – 1 December 2020
- Constituency: Nagarjuna Sagar, Telangana

Member of the Andhra Pradesh Legislative Assembly
- In office 1999–2009
- Preceded by: Narra Raghava Reddy
- Succeeded by: Chirumarthi Lingaiah
- Constituency: Nakrekal Assembly constituency

Personal details
- Born: 9 January 1956 Palem, Nakrekal, Nalgonda, Telangana, India
- Died: 1 December 2020 (aged 64) Hyderabad
- Party: Bharat Rashtra Samithi

Nomula Narsimhaiah Yadav (9 January 1956 – 1 December 2020) was an Indian politician and Member of Telangana Legislative Assembly belonging to Bharat Rashtra Samithi. He was elected as a legislator from Nagarjunasagar constituency in 2018 Telangana general elections by defeating Congress leader Kunduru Jana Reddy by 7771 votes. He was a legislator and a senior leader with CPI-M. He was elected twice as a MLA from Nakrekal assembly constituency and leader of CPI-M in the Legislative Assembly.

He was married and has three children. His son, Nomula Bagath Kumar, is an advocate at the high court of Telangana and also very active in politics and public service. He was helping his father in development of Nagrajuna sagar Constitution.

== Early life ==
He was born in Palem Village Nakrekal Mandal Nalgonda district, Telangana State in Yadav community. In his childhood he was attracted towards communist literature like Telangana Armed Struggle and inspired by legendary personalities. He also loved and was involved in agriculture since his childhood. He has done Master of Arts (MA) and Bachelor of Laws (LLB) at Osmania University.

== Political career ==
In his student life at Osmania University, he has actively led the Students Federation of India. Later, he has joined the Communist Party of India (Marxist). He has been a leading advocate at Nalgonda and Nakrekal judicial courts. He was elected twice as Mandal Parishath President of Nakrekal and elected twice as MLA from Nakrekal constituency in Andhra Pradesh. From 1999 to 2004, he has worked as Floor Leader of CPI(M) in the AP legislative assembly.

=== BRS Party ===
Later, he differed with the CPI(M) party's stand on Telangana and joined the Bharat Rashtra Samithi on 8 April 2014 and contested as BRS party candidate from Nagarjuna Sagar (Assembly constituency) in General Elections 2014 and lost the election.

=== As MLA ===
From Nagarjunasagar constituency In 2018 Assembly elections, he defeated senior leader and sitting MLA of Indian National Congress Party K. Jana Reddy by 7771 votes.

== Death ==
On 1 December 2020, he died of cardiac arrest due to complications from COVID-19 amidst the COVID-19 pandemic in India.
