= Nagarjuna Sagar Assembly constituency =

Constituency of the Telangana legislative assembly in India

Coordinates: 16.58°N 79.31°E

Nagarjuna Sagar
- Constituency No. 87 for the Telangana Legislative Assembly
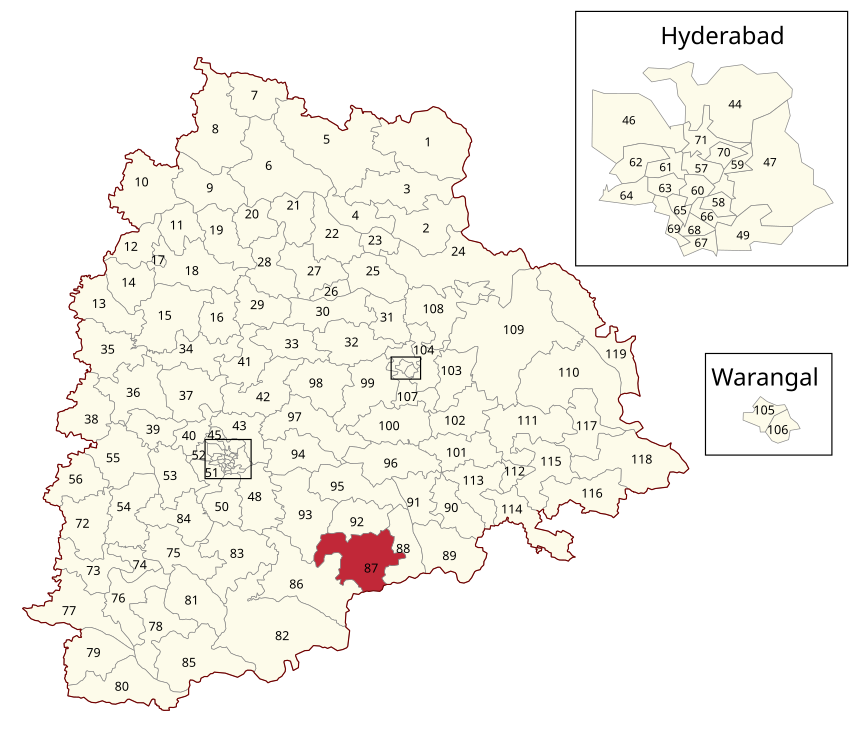
- Location of Nagarjuna Sagar Assembly constituency within Telangana

Constituency details
- Country: India
- Region: South India
- State: Telangana
- District: Nalgonda
- Lok Sabha constituency: Nalgonda
- Established: 2008
- Total electors: 1,91,666
- Reservation: None

Member of Legislative Assembly
- 3rd Telangana Legislative Assembly
- Incumbent Kunduru Jayaveer Reddy
- Party: INC
- Elected year: 2023

Nagarjuna Sagar Assembly constituency is a constituency of the Telangana Legislative Assembly, India. It is one of 12 constituencies in the Nalgonda district. It is part of Nalgonda Lok Sabha constituency.

== Mandals ==
After the recent delimitation, Nagarjuna Sagar Assembly Constituency comprises the following Mandals: Nidamanoor, Gurrampode, Peddavoora, Anumula, Tripuraram and Thirumalagiri Sagar. Kunduru Jayaveer Reddy is the MLA who won the 2023 Assembly election.

== Members of Legislative Assembly ==
Duration	Member	Political party
United Andhra Pradesh
2009	Kunduru Jana Reddy	Indian National Congress
Telangana Legislative Assembly
2014	Kunduru Jana Reddy	Indian National Congress
2018	Nomula Narsimhaiah Yadav	Telangana Rashtra Samithi
2021★	Nomula Bhagath Yadav	Telangana Rashtra Samithi
2023	Kunduru Jayaveer Reddy	Indian National Congress

★by-election

== Election results ==
=== Telangana Legislative Assembly election, 2023 ===
2023 Telangana Legislative Assembly election: Nagarjuna Sagar
Party	Candidate	Votes	%	±%
INC	Kunduru Jayaveer Reddy	1,19,831	59.3	
BRS	Nomula Bhagath	63,982	31.66	
BJP	Kankanala Niveditha Reddy	6,491	3.21	
NOTA	NOTA	1,056	0.52	
Majority		55,849	27.64	
Turnout		2,02,088		
INC hold		Swing		

=== 2021 by-election ===
By-election, 2021: Nagarjuna Sagar
Party	Candidate	Votes	%	±%
TRS	Nomula Bhagath	89,804	47.05	
INC	Kunduru Jana Reddy	70,932	37.16	
BJP	P. Ravi Kumar Naik	7,676	4.02	
NOTA	NOTA	499	0.26	
Majority		18,872	9.88	
Turnout		1,90,861	86.78	
TRS hold		Swing		

=== Telangana Legislative Assembly election, 2018 ===
2018 Telangana Legislative Assembly election: Nagarjuna Sagar
Party	Candidate	Votes	%	±%
TRS	Nomula Narsimhaiah	83,743	46.33	
INC	Kunduru Jana Reddy	76,017	42.05	
SFB	Vadlapally Ramakrishna Reddy	9,832	5.44	
BJP	Kankanala Nivedita Reddy	2,682	1.48	
NOTA	None of the Above	1,333	0.74	
Majority		7,771	4.30	
Turnout		1,80,802	86.62	
TRS gain from INC		Swing		

=== Telangana Legislative Assembly election, 2014 ===
2014 Telangana Legislative Assembly election: Nagarjuna Sagar
Party	Candidate	Votes	%	±%
INC	Kunduru Jana Reddy	69,684	42.72	
TRS	Nomula Narsimhaiah	52,684	40.72	
TDP	Kadari Anjaiah Yadav	27,858	17.2	
Majority		16,780	10.10	
Turnout		1,63,155	80.03	
INC hold		Swing		

== See also ==
- List of constituencies of Telangana Legislative Assembly
- Nagarjuna Sagar
