= Nalgonda mandal =

- Mandal
- Location in Telangana, India Nalgonda mandal (India)
- Country: India
- State: Telangana
- District: Nalgonda
- Headquarters: Nalgonda

Government
  - Body: Mandal Parishad

Population (2011)
  - Total: 200,067

Languages
  - Official: Telugu, Urdu
- Time zone: UTC+5:30 (IST)
- PIN: 508 001

Nalgonda mandal is one of the 59 mandals in Nalgonda district of the Indian state of Telangana. It is under the administration of Nalgonda revenue division and the headquarters are located at Nalgonda.

== Towns and villages ==
As of 2011 census, the mandal has 30 settlements. It includes 1 town, 4 outgrowths and 25 villages.

The settlements in the mandal are listed below:

1. Appaji Peta
2. Anneparthy
3. Cherlapalle
4. Ammaguda
5. Dandampalle
6. Chandan Palle
7. Kanchanpalle
8. Budharam
9. K.Kondaram
10. P.Domalapalle
11. M.Domalapalle
12. Narsing Batla
13. Khudavanpur
14. Donakal
15. Gundlapalle
16. Anantharam
17. Kotha Palle
18. Mamillagudem
19. G.K.Annaram
20. Medla Duppala Palle
21. Munugode
22. Annareddy Guda
23. Velugu Palle
24. Rasoolpur
25. Musham Palle
26. Nalgonda (R) (OG)
27. Panagallu (R) (OG)
28. Gollaguda (R) (OG)
29. Arjalabavi (OG)
30. Gandhamvarigudem

Note: M-Municipality

== See also ==
- List of mandals in Telangana, نلگنڑہ منڑل کی فہرست
