= Balu Naik =

Indian politician

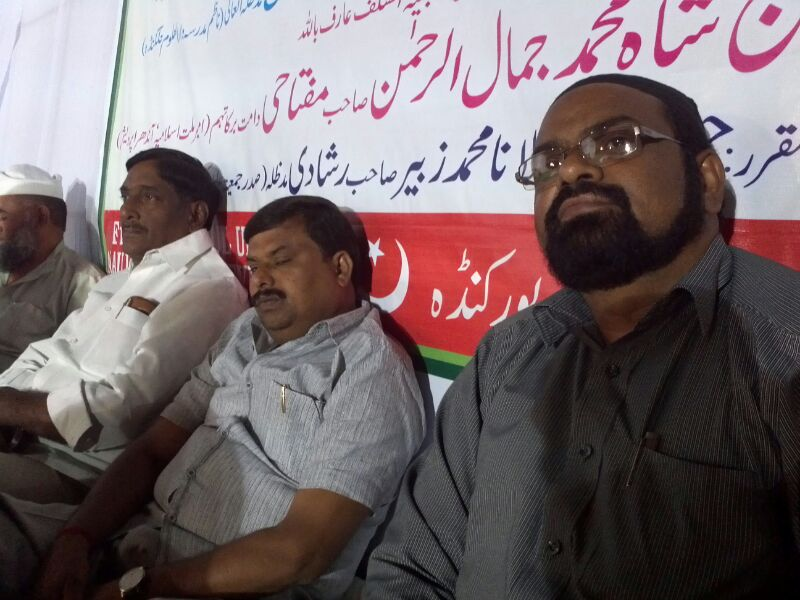
- Balu Naik MLA at a charity event, 2013

Member of the Andhra Pradesh Legislative Assembly
- In office 2009–2014
- Succeeded by: Ravindra Kumar Ramavath
- Constituency: Devarakonda

Personal details
- Born: Nalgonda, India
- Party: Indian National Congress

Nenavath Balu Naik is an Indian politician and former M.L.A from Telangana. He represented the Devarakonda assembly constituency. He belongs to Scheduled Tribe, Lamabadi community.

He was elected to AP Legislative Assembly in 2009.
