= Dibbesvara Temple =

Coordinates: 18°07′54″N 83°28′48″E

Dibbesvara Temple (also known as Dibbalingeswara Swamy Temple or Dibbi Lingeswara Temple) is a medieval Hindu temple dedicated to Lord Shiva, located in the village of Saripalli in Vizianagaram district, Andhra Pradesh, India. The temple is recognised as a centrally protected monument and is maintained by the Archaeological Survey of India under its Amaravati Circle.

The temple is also known locally as Dibbilingeswara Swamy Temple and is listed by the Archaeological Survey of India (ASI) under the name "The old temple (Dibbesvarasvami temple)".

== Location ==
Dibbesvara Temple is located in the village of Saripalli in Vizianagaram district, Andhra Pradesh. The region forms part of northeastern Andhra Pradesh, an area known for several early historic and medieval religious monuments reflecting cultural interaction between the eastern Deccan and the historic Kalinga region.

== Architecture ==
The temple is constructed in the Kalinga (Nagara) architectural style, specifically of the Rekha Deul type. The surviving structure consists of a stone-built sanctum with a square ground plan and a curvilinear shikhara rising vertically in segmented tiers (bhumis), a characteristic feature of Kalinga temples.

Based on architectural features and sculptural elements, the temple is generally dated to the early medieval period, approximately between the 7th and 10th centuries CE. The temple walls display Shaivite iconographic elements typical of regional temple traditions of eastern India.

== Historical and cultural significance ==
The presence of a Kalinga-style Shiva temple in Vizianagaram district indicates historical religious and artistic exchange between present-day Andhra Pradesh and Odisha. Dibbesvara Temple forms part of a broader group of early and medieval monuments in the region that illustrate the spread of Shaivite worship along India's eastern coastal belt.

== Protection and conservation ==
Dibbesvara Temple is officially listed as a Monument of National Importance and is included in the List of Centrally Protected Monuments in Andhra Pradesh published by the Archaeological Survey of India. The monument is under the jurisdiction of the ASI Amaravati Circle, which is responsible for its conservation and protection under national heritage laws.

== See also ==
- List of Monuments of National Importance in Andhra Pradesh
- Kalinga architecture
- Hindu temples in Andhra Pradesh
