= Nellimarla =

- Town
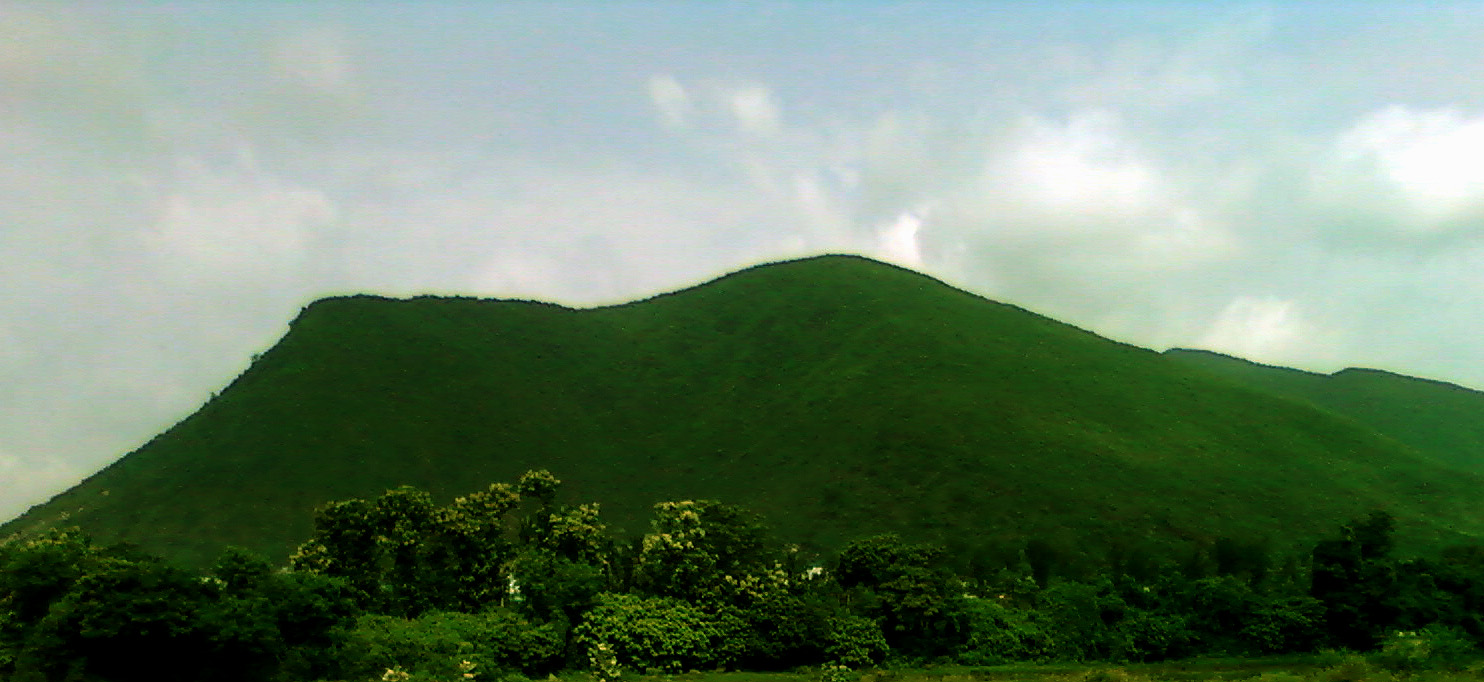
- Eastern Ghats at Nellimarla

- Location in Andhra Pradesh, India
- Coordinates: 18.1667°N 83.4333°E
- Country: India
- State: Andhra Pradesh
- District: Vizianagaram

Government
  - MLA: Lokam Madhavi

Area
  - Total: 15.54 km^{2} (6.00 sq mi)
- Elevation: 190 m (620 ft)

Population (2011)
  - Total: 20,498
  - Density: 1,319/km^{2} (3,416/sq mi)

Languages
  - Official: Telugu
- Time zone: UTC+5:30 (IST)
- PIN: 535217
- Vehicle Registration: AP35 (Former); AP39 (from 30 January 2019)

Nelli-marla is a town in Vizianagaram district of the Indian state of Andhra Pradesh. It is in Nellimarla mandal of Vizianagaram revenue division.

== Etymology ==
The town of Nellimarla derives its name from a Telugu word for the medicinal tree Clerodendrum phlomidis Linn, of the family Verbenaceae, called 'Nelli chettu' or 'Nelli tree'.

The city of Nellore at the extreme south of coastal Andhra Pradesh too derives its name from the same medicinal tree.

The Nelli tree is known by alternate names in Telugu lands, one of which is 'Tekkali' chettu (Telugu: టెక్కలి చెట్టు) (from which Tekkali town in Srikakulam District, north coastal Andhra Pradesh derives its name). 'Tauki' chettu is another name.

== Geography ==
Nellimarla is on the banks of Champavathi River at 18.1667°N 83.4333°E. It has an average elevation of 190 metres (626 ft).

The river is called 'cunning river' (Telugu: donga eru) due to changing course and sudden change of water levels. It flooded many times during the 1990s. But, with the change in climate, water is a rare feature in the river after 2000. The Denkada Anicut was constructed across River Champavathi during 1965–1968. The project is near Saripalli village, Nellimarla Mandal. It uses 0.640 TMC of the available water. The Ayacut of 5,153 acres has been stabilised in Denkada and Bhogapuram Mandals of Vizianagaram District.

== Demographics ==
As of 2001 India census, Nellimaria had a population of 19,352. It was upgraded into Nagar Panchayat in March 2013. According to the 2011 census had a population of 26,000. Males constitute 48% of the population and females 52%. Nellimaria has an average literacy rate of 62%, higher than the national average of 59.5%: male literacy is 70%, and female literacy is 54%. In Nellimaria, 8% of the population is under 6 years of age.

Nellimarla Mandal had a population of 73,753 in 2001. Males constituted 36,657 of the population and females 37,096. Nellimarla Mandal had an average literacy rate of 51%, lower than the national average of 59.5%: male literacy is 62%, and female literacy is 41%.

== Assembly constituency ==
Nellimarla Niyojakavargam

=== Members of the Legislative Assembly ===
- 2019: Badikonda Appala Naidu
- 2014: Narayana Swamy Naidu Pathivada

== Economy ==
Nellimarla jute mill is one of the largest in Andhra Pradesh. It has Jagdish Sarda as its chairman. It is a sacking unit known as Golden Mill sometime ago. Its sacks are of premium quality and one of the best in India. It is one of the largest livelihood providers in the region.
