= Natavalasa =

- village
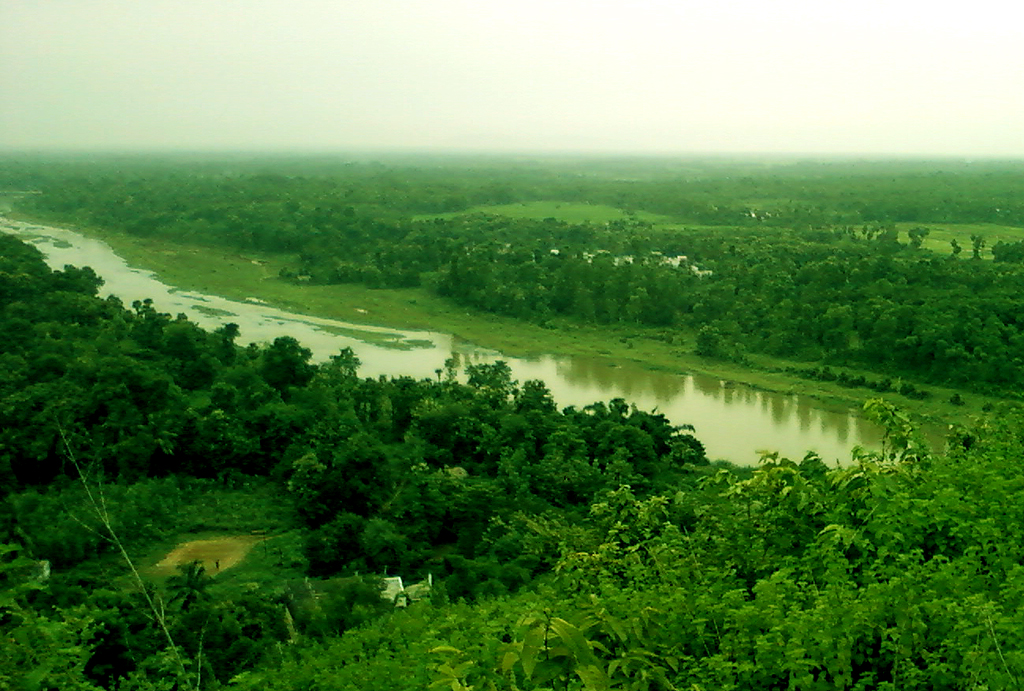
- Champavathi river flows through Natavalasa
- Interactive map of Natavalasa
- Location in Andhra Pradesh, India Natavalasa (India)
- Coordinates: 18.0634751°N 83.5242462°E
- Country: India
- State: Andhra Pradesh
- District: Vizianagaram

Languages
  - Official: Telugu
- Time zone: UTC+5:30 (IST)
- Vehicle registration: AP-35

Natavalasa is a village and panchayat in Denkada mandal of Vizianagaram district, Andhra Pradesh, India. It is located on the banks of River Champavathi.
