= Nandyala (surname) =

Nandyala (Telugu: నంద్యాల) is a Telugu surname. Notable people with the surname include:

- Nandyala Srinivasa Reddy (1918–2019), Indian politician
- Nandyala Varada Rajulu Reddy (born 1942), Indian politician
