= Champavathi River =

River in India

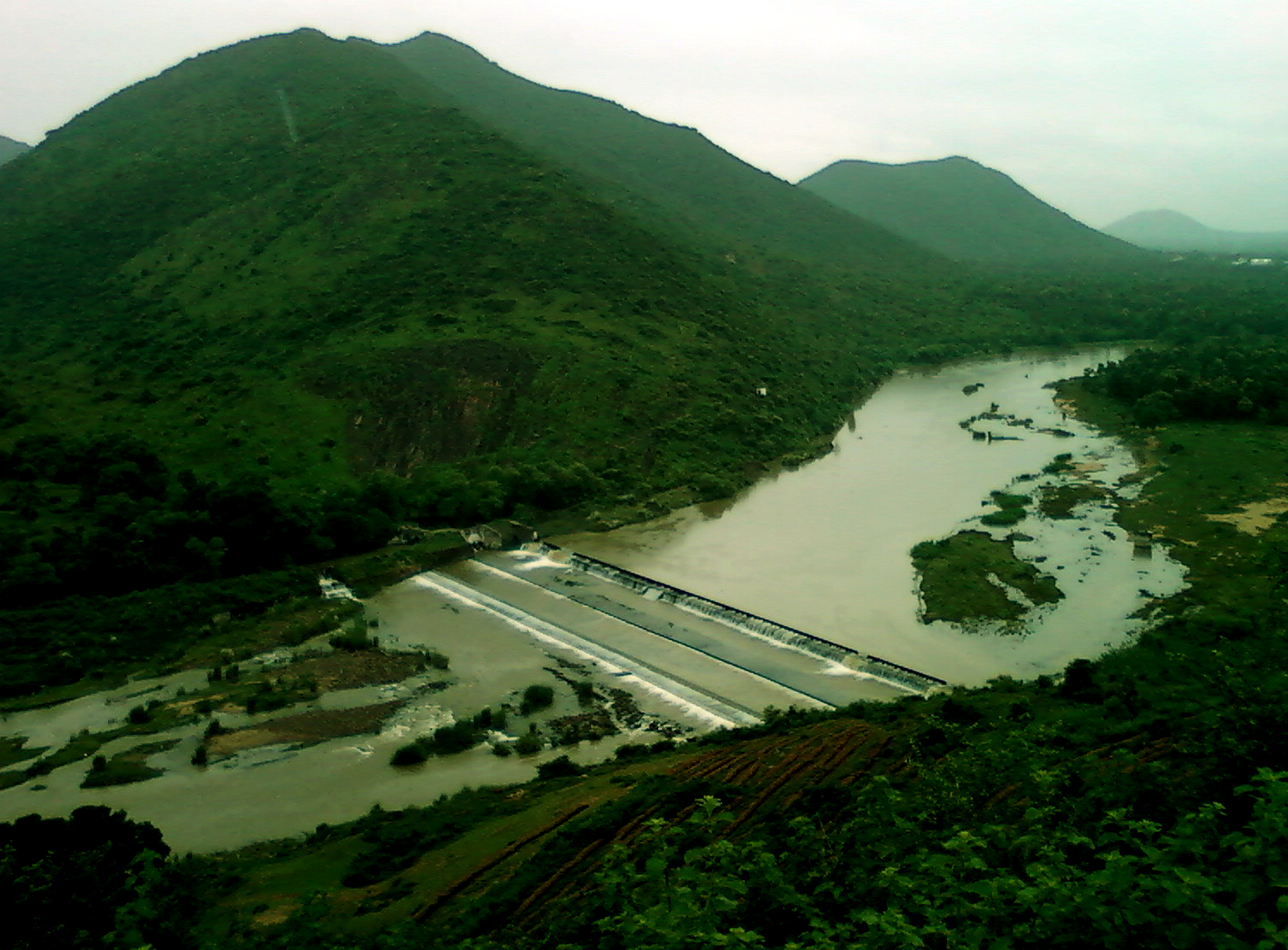
Denkada Barrage on champavathi river at Saripalli in Vizianagaram District

River Champavathi (Telugu: చంపావతి) is a small river which originates in the Eastern Ghats at an altitude of 1,200 metres above mean sea level near Andra village , Gurla Village and flows eastwards and joins the Bay of Bengal near the village Konada. The river passes through Gajapathinagaram, Nellimarla, Saripalli, Denkada, Palem and Natavalasa of Vizianagaram district. The river has four main tributaries Eduvampula Gedda, Chitta Gedda, Pothula Gedda and Gadi Gedda. The basin has a drainage area of 1,410 square kilometres. This area is divisible into Hilly terrain (Madugula hills), Vizianagaram plains and Coastal plains.

Denkada anicut was constructed across Champavathi River in 1965–1968. The project is located near Saripalli village, Nellimarla Mandal, Vizianagaram District to irrigate a total ayacut of 5,153 acres (20.85 km^{2}).

Tarakarama Thirtha Sagaram barrage was constructed to supply irrigation water to 6,690 hectares. Kumili dam with 60 million M^{3} live storage capacity for irrigation purpose was also built in the river basin.
