= Lingaiah =

Lingaiah may refer to:

- Allu Rama Lingaiah (1922–2004), Indian actor
- Chirumarthi Lingaiah (born 2000s), Indian politician
