= Vemula Veeresham =

Indian politician

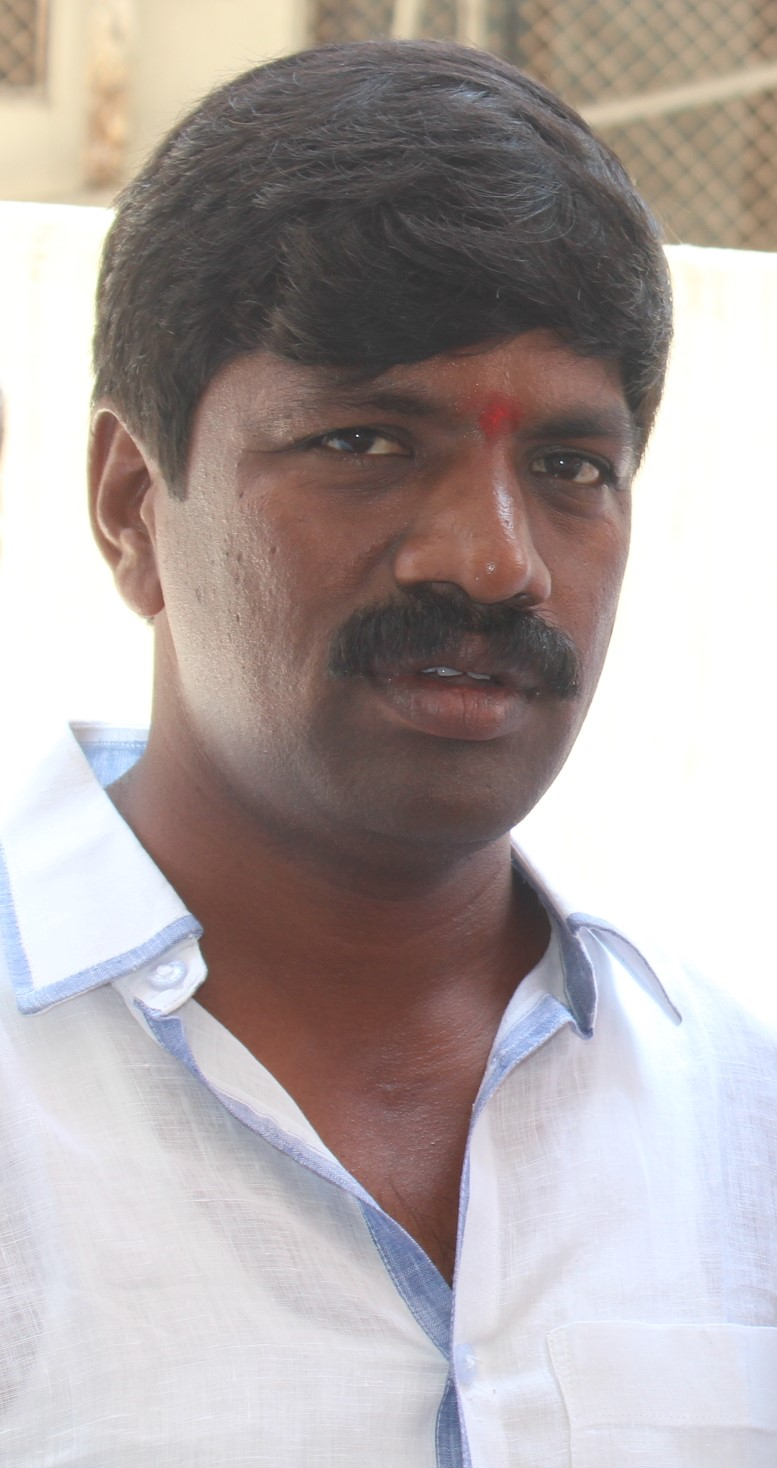

Member of Legislative Assembly, Telangana
- Incumbent
- Assumed office 9 December 2023
- Preceded by: Chirumarthi Lingaiah
- Constituency: Nakrekal
- In office 2 June 2014 – 11 December 2018
- Preceded by: Telangana Assembly Created
- Succeeded by: Chirumarthi Lingaiah
- Constituency: Nakrekal

Personal details
- Born: 1982 (age 43–44) utkoor shaligowraram mandal Nalgonda district, Telangana
- Party: INC (2023-present)
- Other political affiliations: BRS (until 2023)
- Spouse: Pushpa Latha
- Children: Son Vipul Kumar Daughter Vinuthna
- Education: Dr. B. R. Ambedkar Open University

Vemula Veeresham (born 1982) is an Indian politician from Telangana. He represented Nakrekal Assembly constituency. He initially belonged to Telangana Rashtra Samithi but later joined Indian National Congress.

== Early life ==
He was born to Vemula Kondaiah and Mallamma in Utukur village of Shali Gowraram Mandal Nalgonda district, Telangana, India and belongs to scheduled caste, He has completed his school education in Z.P.H.S. Madhavaram Kalan and his intermediate and degree in Nakrekal. Since his school education itself he actively participated in the student organization P.D.S.U.

== Political career ==
Veeresham won from Nakrekal in 2014 Telangana Assembly Elections for the first time by defeating sitting MLA Chirumarthi Lingaiah. Being brought up from a poor backward family he knows the problems of the poor very well. Several development activities were initiated with the support of Minister for Energy, Telangana G. Jagadish Reddy.

He again contested as an MLA on Telangana Rashtra Samithi ticket in 2018 Assembly Elections. He was defeated by Chirumarthi Lingaiah of Indian National Congress. In 2023 Telangana Legislative Assembly election, he contested from the Indian National Congress and won with a majority of 68000 votes. He was Appointed as Govt Whip on 19 March 2026.

== Personal life ==
He is married to Pushpa Latha. They have a son, Vipul Kumar and a daughter, Vinuthna.
