= Pamukunta =

- Village
- Location in Telangana, India Pamukunta (India)
- Coordinates: 17.762992°N 78.906799°E
- Country: India
- State: Telangana
- Region: Telangana
- District: Nalgonda district

Languages
  - Official: Telugu
- Time zone: UTC+5:30 (IST)
- PIN: 508105
- Vehicle registration: TS

Pamukunta is a village in Nalgonda district, in Telangana State, India.

== Transport ==
Pamukunta village is situated on Pamukunta Road with connections to nearby towns and cities with regular buses and other modes of transportation.
