= Chinna Kaparthy =

Chinna Kaparthy is a village in Chityala Mandal in the Nalgonda district of India. It is 75 kilometers from Hyderabad, the capital city of Telangana.
