= Pedda Adiserla Pally =

Pedda Adiserla Pally P A Pally
- Village
- Nickname: P.A.Pally
- Location in Telangana, India Pedda Adiserla Pally (India)
- Coordinates: 16°42′31″N 79°01′43″E
- Country: India
- State: Telangana
- District: Nalgonda

Area
  - Total: 45.10 km^{2} (17.41 sq mi)

Population (2011)
  - Total: 11,925
  - Density: 264.4/km^{2} (684.8/sq mi)

Languages
  - Official: Telugu
- Time zone: UTC+5:30 (IST)
- PIN: 508 243
- Vehicle registration: TS 05
- Nearest city: Devarakonda
- Lok Sabha constituency: Nalgonda
- Vidhan Sabha constituency: Devarakonda
- Website: telangana.gov.in

Pedda Adiserla Pally, (or P.A.Pally) is a village in Nalgonda district of the Indian state of Telangana. It is located in Pedda Adiserla Pally mandal of Devarakonda division.

== Population ==
The total population in Pedda Adiserla Palle sub district is 50,338 as per the survey of census during 2011 by Indian Government. Of this about 50,338 people are living in the urban (towns and cities) area and about 50,338 are living in villages (rural areas).

There are 11,931 households in this Mandal.

There are 25,771 males (51%) and 24,567 females (49%). Further the children below 6 years of age are 6,586 of which 3,448 are males and 3,138 are females.

Total Scheduled Cast are 7,798. Total Scheduled Tribe are 15,414.

Literates are 22,690 of which males are 14,080 and females are 8,610. There are 27,648 illiterates.

Workers in Pedda Adiserla Palle Mandal are calculated as 27,622 of which 14,058 are males and 13,564 are females. Further 24,639 are regular and 2,983 are irregular (that is, have jobs only a few days in a month). There are 22,716 non-workers (include students, housewives, and children above 6 years also.)

== Government Offices ==
Mandal Revenue Office (M R O), Mandal Development Office(M D O ), Grama Panchayathi, Dwakra Bhavan(Mahila Sangham Bhavanam), District Central Co-operative Bank(D C C Bank), Hospital.

== Buildings ==
T. S. Model High School and Jr college, Primary School(C P S), Zilla Parishath High School(Z P H S), Social Welfare(Gurukula School), Community Hall, Scheduled Tribe Hostel. KGBV School, Pragathi high school which is private, Sri Sai Krishnaveni EM School which is private, St Mary's EM School which is private.
