= Kunduru Raghuveer =

Indian politician

Member of Parliament, Lok Sabha
- Incumbent
- Assumed office 4 June 2024
- Preceded by: N. Uttam Kumar Reddy
- Constituency: Nalgonda

Personal details
- Born: 2 January 1980 (age 46)
- Party: Indian National Congress
- Relations: Kunduru Jayaveer Reddy (Brother)
- Parent: Kunduru Jana Reddy (Father)

Kunduru Raghuveer is an Indian politician and the elected candidate for Lok Sabha from Nalgonda Lok Sabha constituency. He is a member of the Indian National Congress.

He was appointed as Telangana Pradesh Congress Committee (TPCC) Vice President on 9 June 2025.

== See also ==
- 18th Lok Sabha
