= Chirumarthi Lingaiah =

Indian politician

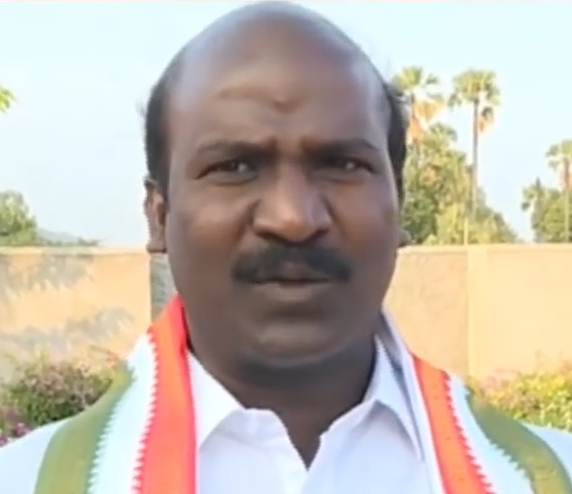

Member of Legislative Assembly
- In office 2009-14, 2018-2023
- Preceded by: Vemula Veeresham
- Constituency: Nakrekal

Personal details
- Born: Narketpally district, Telangana
- Party: Bharat Rashtra Samithi
- Other political affiliations: Indian National Congress until 2019
- Occupation: Politician

Chirumarthi Lingaiah is an Indian politician. He was an MLA from Nakrekal assembly constituency in Nalgonda district, Telangana, India. He belongs to Bharat Rashtra Samithi.

== Early life ==
He was born in Nalgonda district, TS, India in a scheduled caste, Madiga community. He studied at Osmania University.

== Career ==
Chirumarthi Lingaiah won the SC reserved seat, Nakrekal constituency, in 2009. He resigned in 2010 for Telangana cause but was not accepted. He again resigned in October 2011 along with Komatireddy Venkat Reddy.

In the Assembly elections in 2018, he again contested on Indian National Congress ticket. He defeated Vemula Veeresham of Telangana Rashtra Samithi and later joined Telangana Rashtra Samithi.
