= Tripuraram =

- Village
- Location in Telangana, India Tripuraram (India)
- Coordinates: 17.0600°N 79.3°E
- Country: India
- State: Telangana
- District: Nalgonda
- Talukas: Nidmanoor
- Elevation: 17 m (56 ft)

Languages
  - Official: Telugu
- Time zone: UTC+5:30 (IST)
- PIN: 508207
- Telephone code: 08689
- Vehicle registration: TS 05

Tripuraram is a village in Nalgonda district in Telangana, India. It is located in Tripuraram mandal of Miryalaguda division.

This mandal belongs to constitution of Nagarjuna Sagar (Assembly constituency) (previously in Chalakurthy) for assembly and Nalgonda for parliament.the current elected MLA is nomula bhagath from TRS Party and current elected MP is Nalamada Uttam Kumar Reddy from Indian National Congress.

== Demographics ==
The population of Tripuraram is around 12,000.

== Economy ==
People of Tripuraram mainly depend on agriculture for their livelihood. The most common crop is rice and the main irrigation facility is through Nagarjuna Sagar left canal. Minor part of field depends on underground water.

== Temples ==
The temples in Tripuraram are Ramalayam, Ganapathi Temple, Bramhamgari Temple, Sri Parvathi Jadala Ramalingeswara Swamy Temple, Nagadevatha Temple and Hanuman Temple.

== Education ==
Schools include Vidyanikethan High School, Vishwabharathi High School, Alpha Public School, Stanford Model School, Little Flower School, Rainbow School, TS Model School and ZPHS. Also a college named Shanthinikethan Junior College at 1/2 km from Tripuraram.
