= Vemulapally, Telangana =

Vemulapally
- Location in Telangana, India Vemulapally (India)
- Coordinates: 16°55′38″N 79°31′41″E
- Country: India
- State: Telangana
- District: Nalgonda

Languages
  - Official: Telugu
- Time zone: UTC+5:30 (IST)
- Postal code: 508217
- Vehicle registration: TS
- Climate: hot (Köppen)
- Website: telangana.gov.in

Vemulapally is a village in Nalgonda district, Telangana, India. It is located in Vemulapally mandal of Miryalaguda division.
