= Chandur, Telangana =

Chandur చండూర్ Telugu
- Census town
- Location in Telangana, India Chandur చండూర్ (India)
- Coordinates: 16.98°N 79.06°E
- Country: India
- State: Telangana
- District: Nalgonda

Government
  - Type: Municipality
  - Body: Chandur Municipality
  - Municipal Chairman: Dr. Kodi. Srinivasulu (Indian National Congress(INC))
- Elevation: 484 m (1,588 ft)

Population (2001)
  - Total: 10,762

Languages
  - Official: Telugu
- Time zone: UTC+5:30 (IST)
- PIN: 508255
- Area code: 08681 (STD Code) Country Code: +91
- ISO 3166 code: IN-TG
- Vehicle registration: TG
- Lok Sabha Constituency: Bhongir
- Vidhan Sabha Constituency: Munugode Assembly constituency
- Website: https://chandurmunicipality.telangana.gov.in/

Chandur is a city and revenue division in the Nalgonda district of the Indian state of Telangana. It is classified as a census town and municipality, and also serves as the headquarters of Chandur Mandal. A beautiful and peaceful town. There are various legends about the etymology of the name one of the folklore says Chandi uuru (The village of goddess Chandi) as there is a famous Chandi maata temple of which the deity resembles to the goddess Durga of Vijayawada and is said to be commenced at the same time of the famous temple.

== Geography ==
Chandur is located at 16.98°N 79.06°E. It has an average elevation of 484 metres (1587 feet).

== Chandur Revenue Division ==
The state government has issued a final notification setting up Chandur Revenue Division in Nalgonda district. As part of Munugodu's by-election campaign, CM KCR had promised to convert Chandur into a revenue division in an open meeting held in Chandur earlier. To this extent, the government has established Chandur in Nalgonda district as a revenue division.

Under sub-section (5) of section 3 of the Telangana District (Formation) Act 1974 (Act No.7 of 1974), notice is hereby given to all the concerned, that the Government in the interest of better administration and development of the areas concerned proposed for formation of New Revenue Division “Chandur" in Nalgonda District in the State of Telangana, as detailed in Schedule I & II hereto appended.

Name of the Proposed Mandals in New Division

1. Chandur
2. Munugode
3. Ghattupal
4. Nampally
5. Marriguda

== Demographics ==
As of 2001 India census, Chandur had a population of 10,762. Males constitute 50% of the population and females 50%. Chandur has an average literacy rate of 62%, higher than the national average of 59.5%; with male literacy of 73% and female literacy of 51%. 14% of the population is under 6 years of age.

== Education ==
Don Bosco Junior College is the college in Chandur. Students from the surrounding villages pursue their studies at this college. Every year on January 31, Don Bosco feast is celebrated with pomp and joy. This college has been catering to poor students in order to have access to quality education through various cultural and multi skill activities.

== Religion ==
List of some religious places in Chandur are:

- Markandeya Temple
- Chinthanjaneya Swamy Temple
- Jama Masjid
- Don Bosco Church
- Eid Gah
- Kanakadurga devi temple
- Sri Anjaneya Swamy Temple
- Subrahmanyam Swamy Temple
- Lord Shiva Temple
- Ayyappa Swamy Temple
- Sai Baba Temple
- Masjid Noor

== List of Villages in Chandur Mandal ==
Angadipeta Bangarigadda Bodangi Parthy Donipamula(jogigudem) Gundrepalle Idikuda Kasthala Kondapuram Lakkinenigudem Nermata Pullemla Sirdepalle Thummalapalle (ThimmaReddy Gudem) Kotayagudem Udathala Palle

== Nearest Cities ==
Nalgonda- 35 km

Chouttuppal - 53 km

Hyderabad- 100 km
