= Thipparthy =

Thipparthi
- Village
- Location in Telangana, India Thipparthi (India)
- Coordinates: 17.0167°N 79.4167°E
- Country: India
- State: Telangana
- District: Nalgonda
- Elevation: 221 m (725 ft)

Languages
  - Official: Telugu
- Time zone: UTC+5:30 (IST)
- PIN: 508247
- Telephone code: 08682
- Vehicle registration: TG
- Nearest cities: Nalgonda, Suryapet
- Lok Sabha constituency: Nalgonda
- Vidhan Sabha constituency: Nalgonda
- Website: telangana.gov.in

Thipparthy is a village in the Nalgonda district in Telangana. It is located in Thipparthy mandal of Nalgonda division. Thippathy falls under the constituency of Nalgonda and Komatireddy Venkat Reddy is the present MLA representing the Mandal.

== Geography ==
Tipparti is located at 17.0167°N 79.4167°E. It has an average elevation of 221 metres (728 ft).
