= Palem =

- village
- Location in Telangana, India Palem (India)
- Coordinates: 17.0600°N 79.3°E
- Country: India
- State: Telangana
- District: Anumula
- Elevation: 17.0700 m (56.004 ft)

Languages
  - Official: Telugu
- Time zone: UTC+5:30 (IST)
- PIN: 508001
- Telephone code: 08682
- Vehicle registration: TS
- Website: telangana.gov.in

Palem is a village and Gram panchayat of Anumula mandal, Nalgonda district, in Telangana state in India.

Several villages also have Palem as the second part of their name, including Pagadam Vari Palem, Kotireddy Palem, Tummala Palem and Rambhatla palem.
