= Chintapally, Nalgonda district =

Chintapally
- Village
- Location in Telangana, India Chintapally (India)
- Coordinates: 16.871576°N 78.803444°E
- Country: India
- State: Telangana
- District: Nalgonda

Area
  - Total: 24.08 km^{2} (9.30 sq mi)

Population (2011)
  - Total: 4,368
  - Density: 181.4/km^{2} (469.8/sq mi)

Languages
  - Official: Telugu
- Time zone: UTC+5:30 (IST)
- PIN: 508250
- Vehicle registration: TS
- Lok Sabha constituency: Nalgonda
- Vidhan Sabha constituency: Devarakonda
- Website: telangana.gov.in

Chintapally is a village in the Nalgonda district of the Indian state of Telangana. It is located in Chintapally mandal of Devarakonda division.
