= Ramavath Ravindra Kumar =

Indian politician

Member of Legislative Assembly
- In office 2004-2009 & 2014-2023
- Constituency: Devarakonda

Personal details
- Born: Devarakonda, Telangana
- Party: BRS
- Occupation: Politician

Ramavath Ravindra Kumar is an Indian politician from Telangana belonging to Telangana Rashtra Samithi. He is representing Devarakonda Assembly constituency.

== Early life and education ==
He was born in Sheripally village near Devarakonda in Nalgonda district in a Lambadi caste. He holds LLB and MA degrees.

== Political career ==
As a CPI candidate from Devarakonda Ravindra Kumar contested 2004 Andhra Pradesh Legislative Assembly election. He was elected as MLA for the first time by defeating nearest rival from TDP. In 2014 he won for a second time as an MLA from CPI. He was the only MLA from CPI in Telangana Assembly and subsequently he is the floor leader of CPI in the Telangana Assembly. Later he changed into TRS party.
