= Peddavoora =

- Village
- Location in Telangana, India Peddavoora (India)
- Coordinates: 16°43′45″N 79°12′25″E
- Country: India
- State: Telangana
- District: Nalgonda

Area
  - Total: 27.22 km^{2} (10.51 sq mi)

Population (2011)
  - Total: 4,529
  - Density: 166.4/km^{2} (430.9/sq mi)

Languages
  - Official: Telugu
- Time zone: UTC+5:30 (IST)
- PIN: 508266
- Vehicle registration: TS
- Lok Sabha constituency: Nalgonda
- Vidhan Sabha constituency: Nagarjuna Sagar
- Website: telangana.gov.in

Peddavoora Mandal is one of the 33 mandals in Nalgonda district of the Indian state of Telangana. It is located in Peddavoora Village of Miryalaguda revenue division.
