= Saripalli =

- village
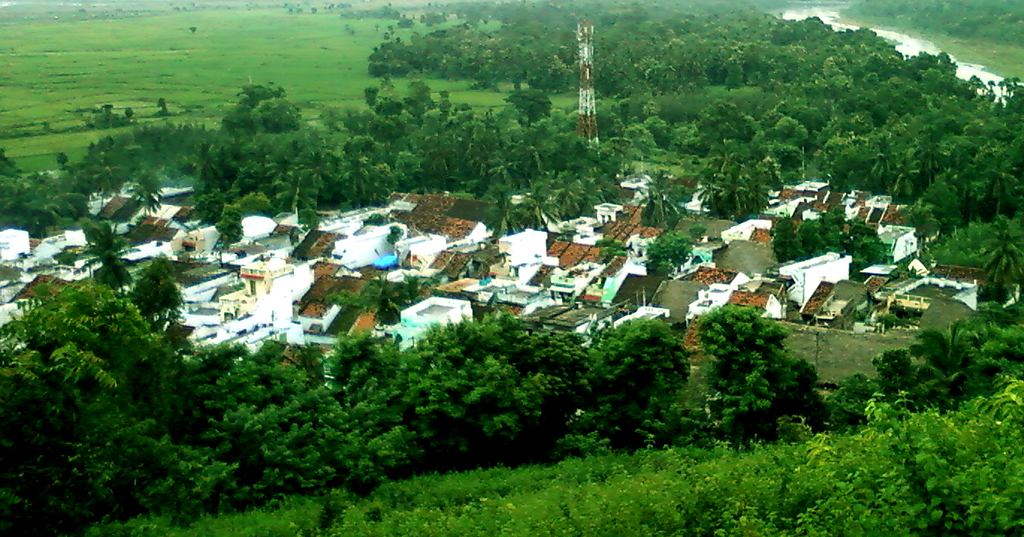
- view of Saripalli village from a hillock
- Interactive map of Saripalli
- Location in Andhra Pradesh, India Saripalli (India)
- Coordinates: 18°07′52″N 83°28′56″E
- Country: India
- State: Andhra Pradesh

Languages
  - Official: Telugu
- Time zone: UTC+5:30 (IST)
- PIN: 535218

Saripalli is a village in Nellimarla mandal of Vizianagaram district in Andhra Pradesh, India.

Located on the banks of Champavathi River, Saripalli is famous for Dibbi Lingeswara Swami temple, constructed between the seventh and tenth centuries by Kalingas, featuring beautiful sculptures on the temple walls; and Ramalingeswara Swamy temple on a small hillock near adjacent to the village of Saripalli.

== Gallery ==
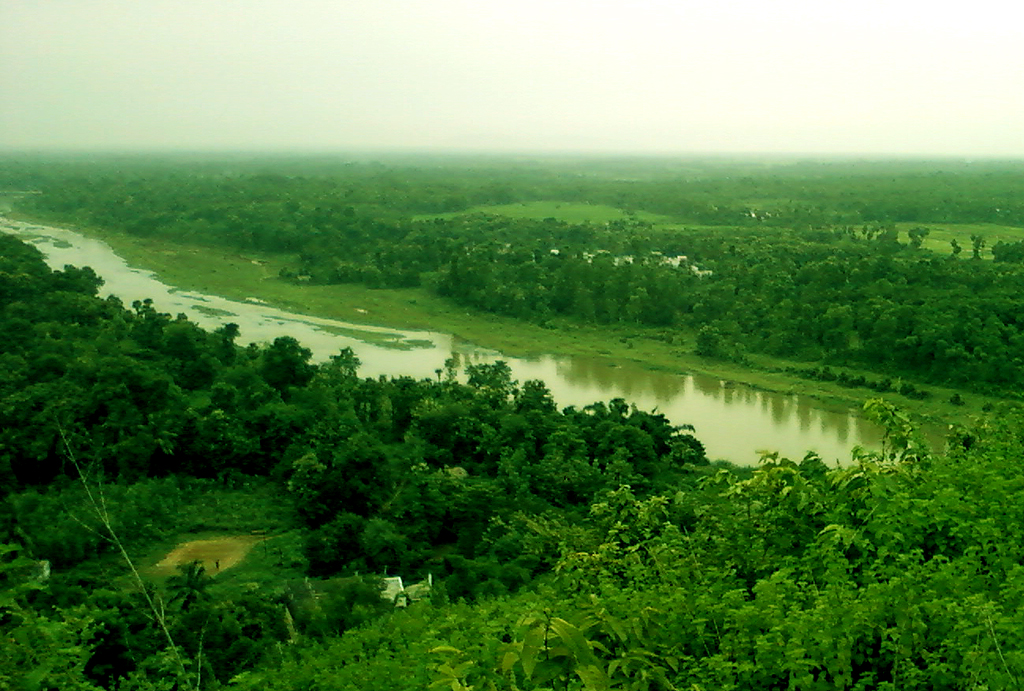
Champavathi river at Saripalli in Vizianagaram District

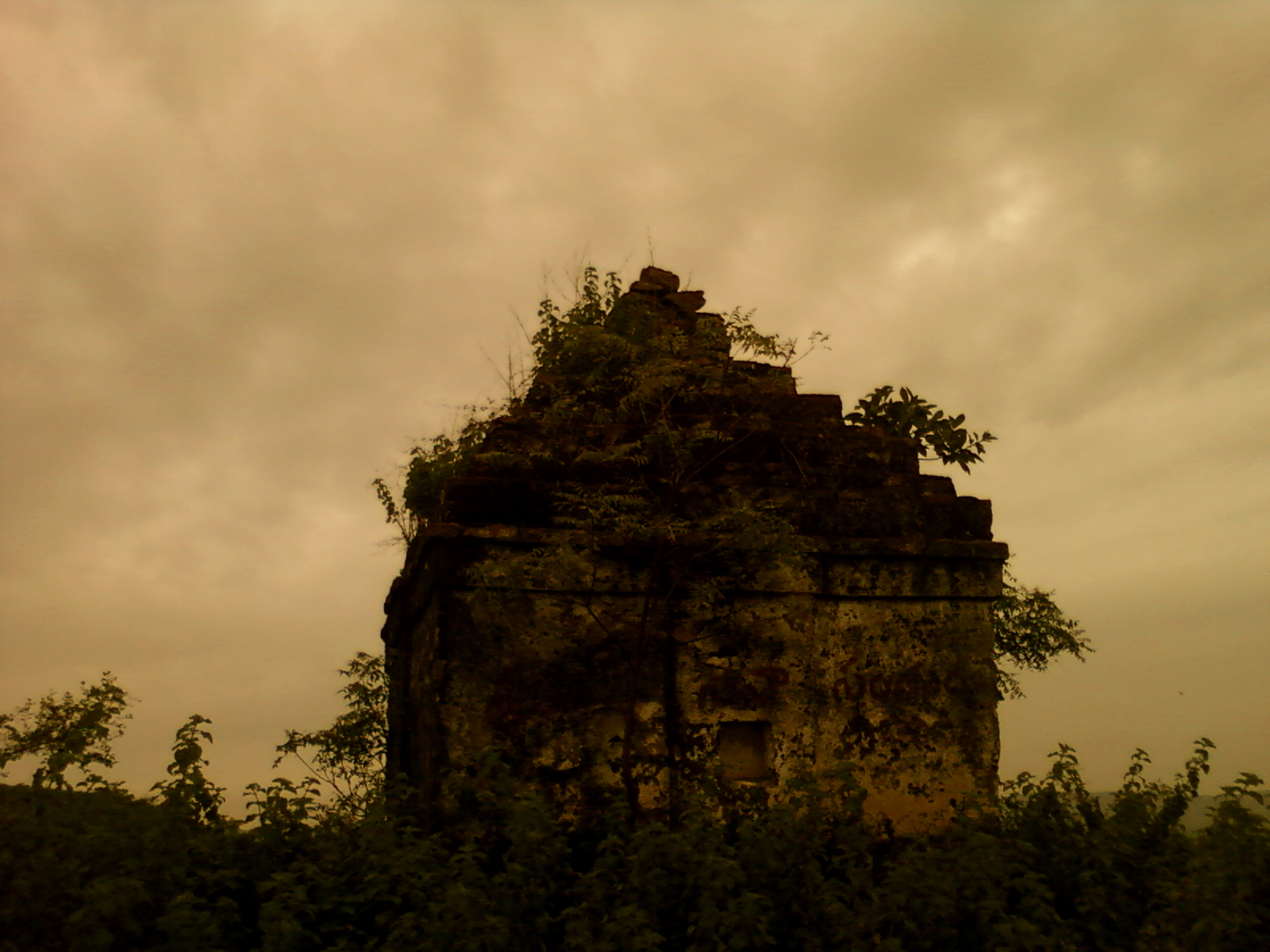
A Ruined Hindu temple at Saripalli hillock in Vizianagaram District

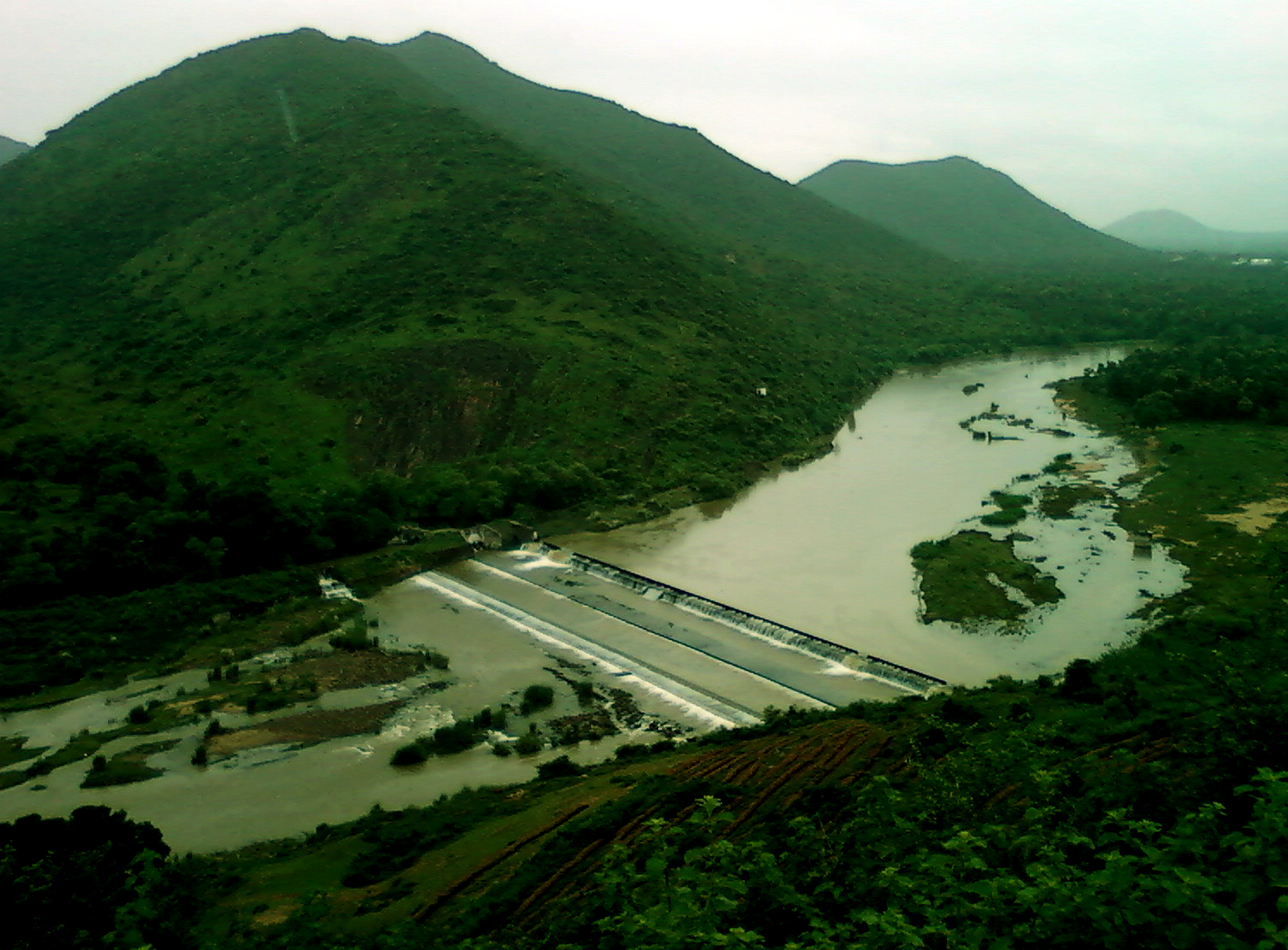
Denkada Barrage at Saripalli, Vizianagaram District

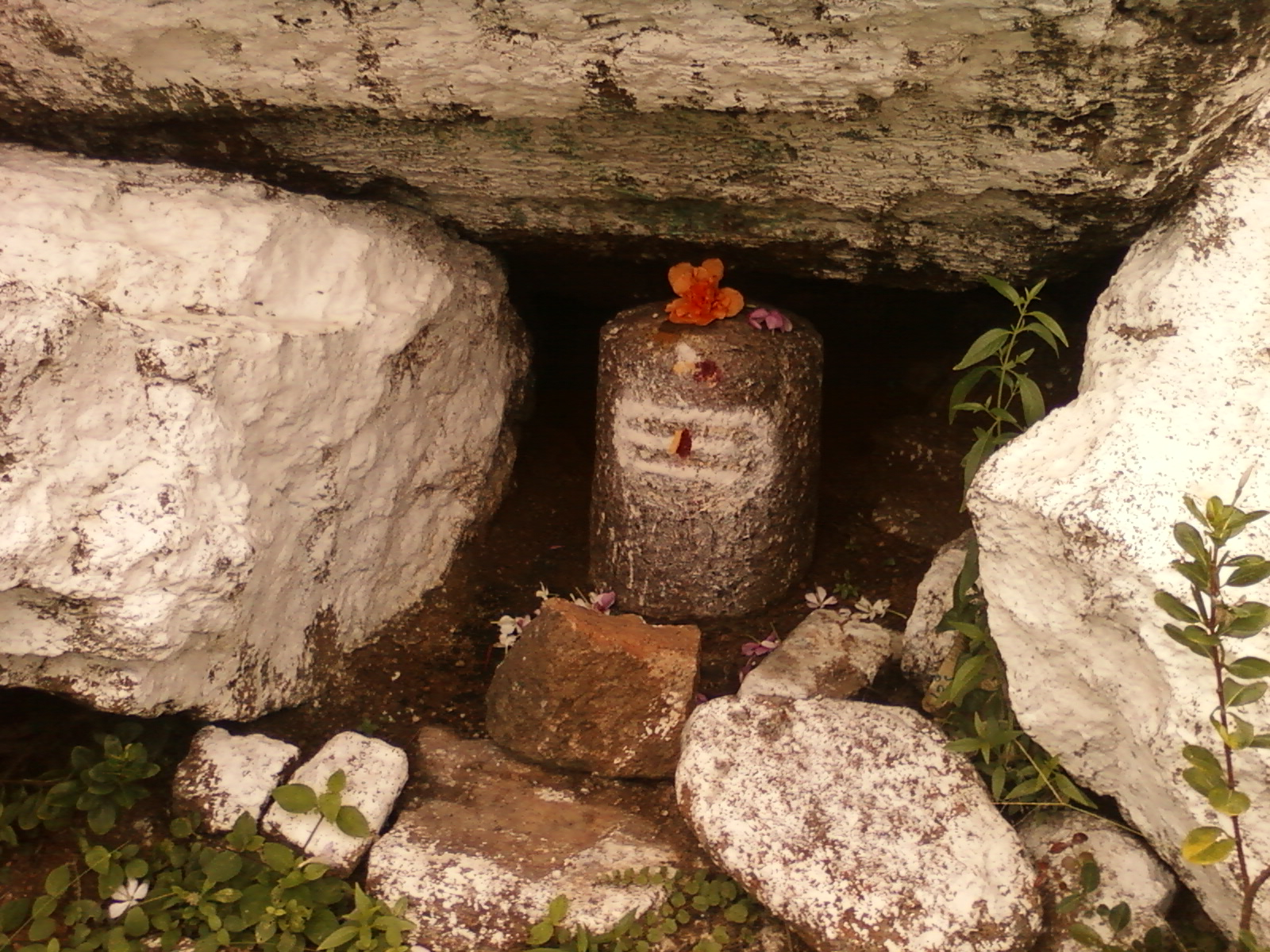
Ramalingeswara temple in Saripalli, Vizianagaram district

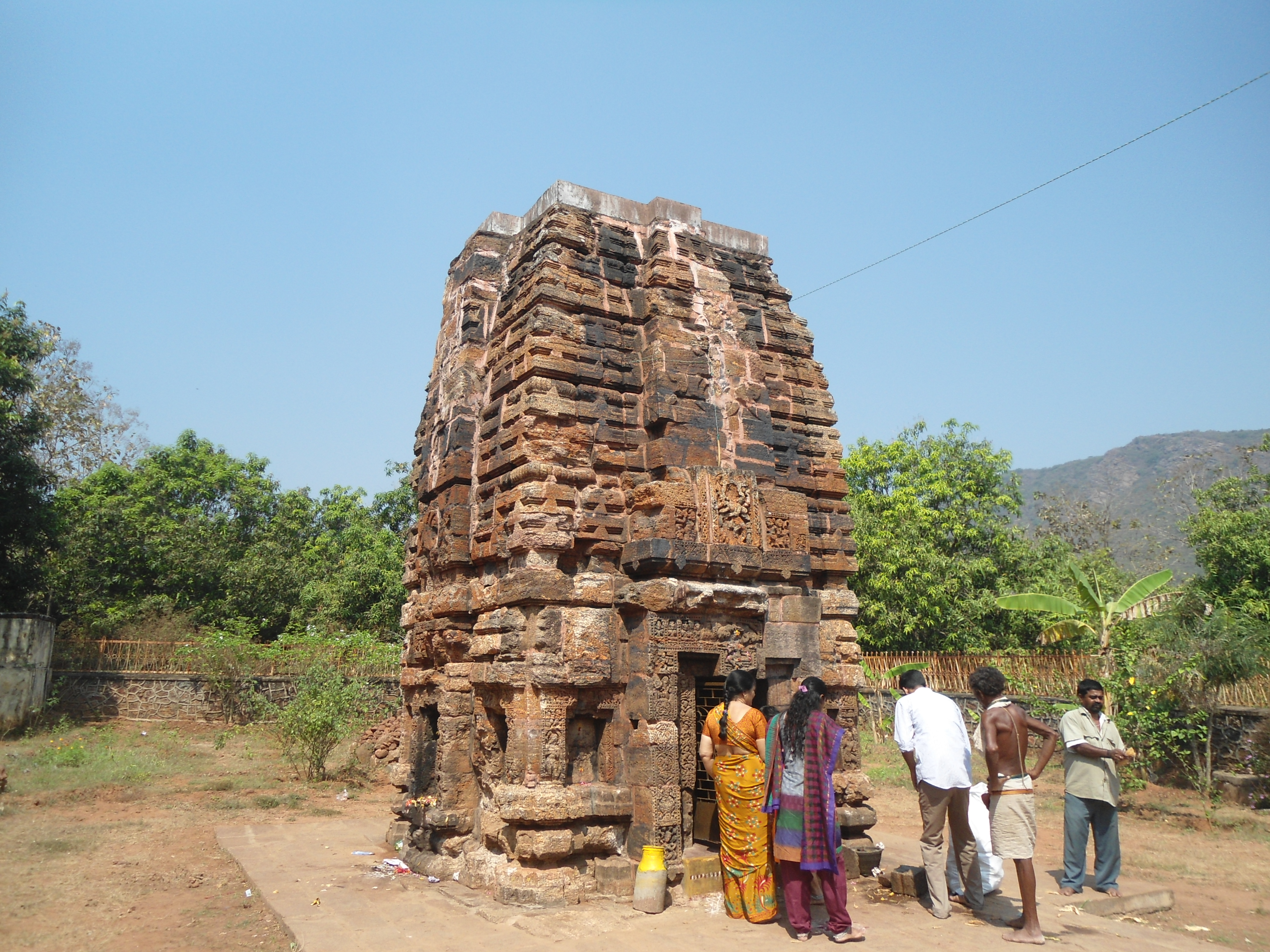
Dibbalingeswara Temple at Saripalli, Vizianagaram district
