= Nandyala Srinivasa Reddy =

Indian politician (1918–2019)

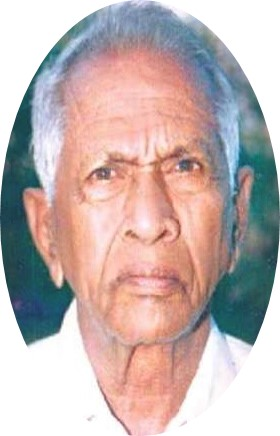

Personal details
- Born: 1918 Koppolu, Nalgonda, Telangana
- Died: 20 February 2019 (aged 100–101) Kattangur, Nalgonda
- Spouse: Raghunadhamma
- Children: Harinder, Venudhar, Krupakar And Daughter VindhyaRani and Ashok
- Parents: Appa Reddy (father); Lakshminarsamma (mother)
- Known for: Telangana Rebellion Leader, Nakrekal Constituency Ex-MLA

Nandyala Srinivasa Reddy (1918 – 20 February 2019), also known as NSR, was a prominent political figure in Telangana. He served as a Member of Legislative Assembly, Andhra Pradesh. He was actively involved in the Telangana Rebellion, and a Communist Party of India political activist. NSR fought against feudalistic policies and advocated for social and economic equality

== Early life and Telangana rebellion ==
NSR hailed from an affluent landlord family in Koppolu, Nalgonda. He completed his schooling in Suryapet and Warangal during the 1930s and actively participated in the Andhra Mahasabha, where he organized meetings and educated the youth about the injustices perpetrated by feudal lords and the Razakars in the Telangana region. He played a crucial role in the Telangana Rebellion and led Nalgonda Taluka Squad. During the movement NSR was arrested and was given death sentence along with others. NSR, along with Nalla Narsimhalu, managed to escape from the Hyderabad court prison, and both were eventually acquitted of the charges brought against them.

== Political life ==
Nandyala Srinivasa Reddy was elected as the Member of the Legislative Assembly from Nakrekal Constituency during the 1962 General Elections. Throughout his active years as a member of the district and state committees, NSR played a crucial role in the activities of the CPI(M) party. He also served as part of the special screening committee established by the Government of India. This committee was responsible for examining and approving pension applications submitted by the freedom fighters who had actively participated in the Telangana Armed Struggle.
