= Kanagal, Nalgonda =

Kanagal
- Village
- Location in Telangana, India Kanagal (India)
- Coordinates: 16.944°N 79.216°E
- Country: India
- State: Telangana
- District: Nalgonda

Languages
  - Official: Telugu
- Time zone: UTC+5:30 (IST)
- PIN: 508255
- Vehicle registration: TS
- Nearest city: Nalgonda
- Lok Sabha constituency: Nalgonda
- Vidhan Sabha constituency: Nalgonda
- Climate: hot (Köppen)
- Website: telangana.gov.in

Kanagal is a village in Nalgonda district of Telangana, India.
