= Anumula =

- Village
- Location within Telangana Location within India
- Coordinates: 16.784°N 79.302°E
- Country: India
- State: Telangana
- District: Nalgonda

Languages
  - Official: Telugu
- Time zone: UTC+5:30 (IST)
- PIN: 508377
- Telephone code: 08680
- Vehicle registration: TS 05
- Website: telangana.gov.in

Anumula is a village in Nalgonda district, Telangana, India. It is the headquarters of Anumula mandal in Miryalaguda division.

Between Anumula and nearby Haliya lies the Nagarjuna Sagar left canal (a.k.a. Lalbahadur Shastri canal), which is 295 km long and irrigates 0.32 million acres (800 km^{2}) of land in Nalgonda and Khammam districts of Telangana region.
