= Nomula Bhagath Yadav =

Indian politician

Nomula Bhagath

Member of Telangana Legislative Assembly
- In office 2 May 2021 – 2023
- Preceded by: Nomula Narsimhaiah
- Succeeded by: Kunduru Jaiveer Reddy
- Constituency: Nagarjuna Sagar

Personal details
- Born: 10 October 1984 (age 42) Nalgonda, Telangana, India
- Party: Bharat Rashtra Samithi
- Parent(s): Nomula Narsimhaiah (father); Nomula Laxmi (mother)
- Occupation: Politician

Nomula Bhagath Yadav is an Indian politician who is serving as Member of Telangana Legislative Assembly from Nagarjuna Sagar Assembly constituency.

== Personal life ==
He was born on 10 October 1984 in Nalgonda. He is the son of Nomula Narsimhaiah and Nomula Laxmi.
