= Chandampet =

- Village
- Interactive map of Chandampet
- Country: India
- State: Telangana
- District: Nalgonda

Area
  - Total: 10.79 km^{2} (4.17 sq mi)

Population (2011)
  - Total: 1,630
  - Density: 151/km^{2} (391/sq mi)

Languages
  - Official: Telugu
- Time zone: UTC+5:30 (IST)
- PIN: 508258
- Vehicle registration: TS 05
- Nearest city: Devarkonda
- Sex ratio: 70% ♂/♀
- Literacy: 50%
- Vidhan Sabha constituency: Devarakonda
- Website: telangana.gov.in

Chamdampet is a village in Nalgonda district of the Indian state of Telangana. It is located in Chandampet mandal of Devarakonda division.
