= Gundlapally =

- Village
- Interactive map of Gundlapally
- Coordinates: 17°03′07″N 79°12′32″E
- Country: India
- State: Telangana
- District: Nalgonda

Languages
  - Official: Telugu
- Time zone: UTC+5:30 (IST)
- Vehicle registration: TS
- Nearest city: Hyderabad, India
- Climate: hot (Köppen)
- Website: telangana.gov.in

Gundlapally is a village in Nalgonda district of Telangana, India.
