= Denkada =

Coordinates: 18°10′35″N 83°21′53″E

- Village
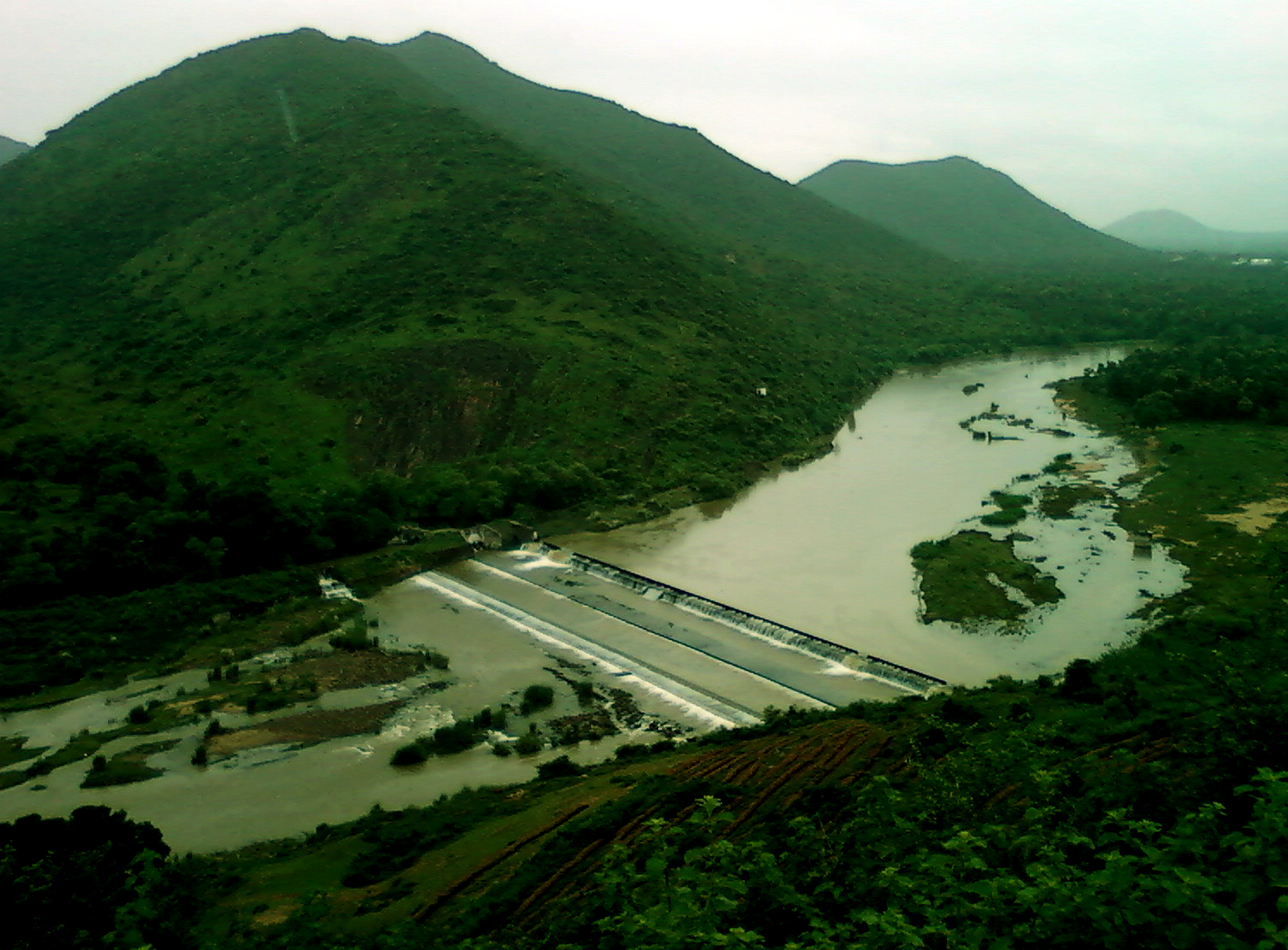
- Denkada Barrage at Saripalli in Vizianagaram District
- Interactive map of Denkada
- Country: India
- State: Andhra Pradesh
- District: Vizianagaram

Languages
  - Official: Telugu
- Time zone: UTC+5:30 (IST)
- Vehicle Registration: AP35 (Former); AP39 (from 30 January 2019)

Denkada is a village in Vizianagaram district of the Indian state of Andhra Pradesh, India. Denkada is located on the banks of River Champavathi.
