= Kattangur =

Kattangoor
- Village
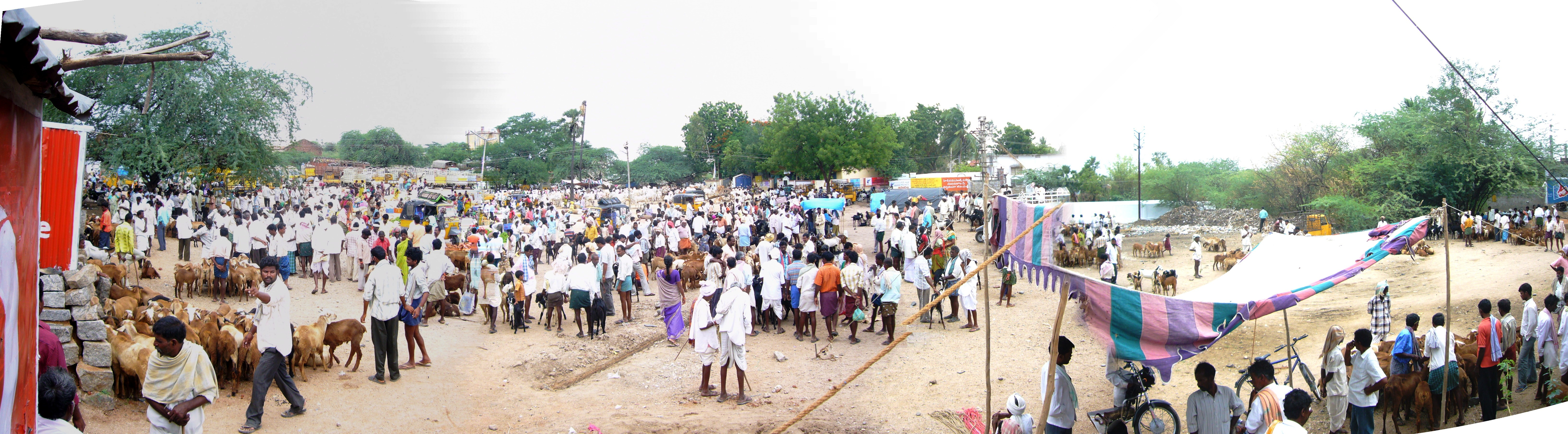
- Cattle fair in Kattangur village

- Location in Telangana, India Kattangoor (India)
- Coordinates: 17.160°N 79.313°E
- Country: India
- State: Telangana
- District: Nalgonda

Area
  - Total: 16.11 km^{2} (6.22 sq mi)

Population (2011)
  - Total: 7,034
  - Density: 436.6/km^{2} (1,131/sq mi)

Languages
  - Official: Telugu
- Time zone: UTC+5:30 (IST)
- PIN: 508205
- Telephone code: 08682
- Vehicle registration: TS
- Lok Sabha constituency: Bhongir
- Vidhan Sabha constituency: Nakrekal
- Website: telangana.gov.in

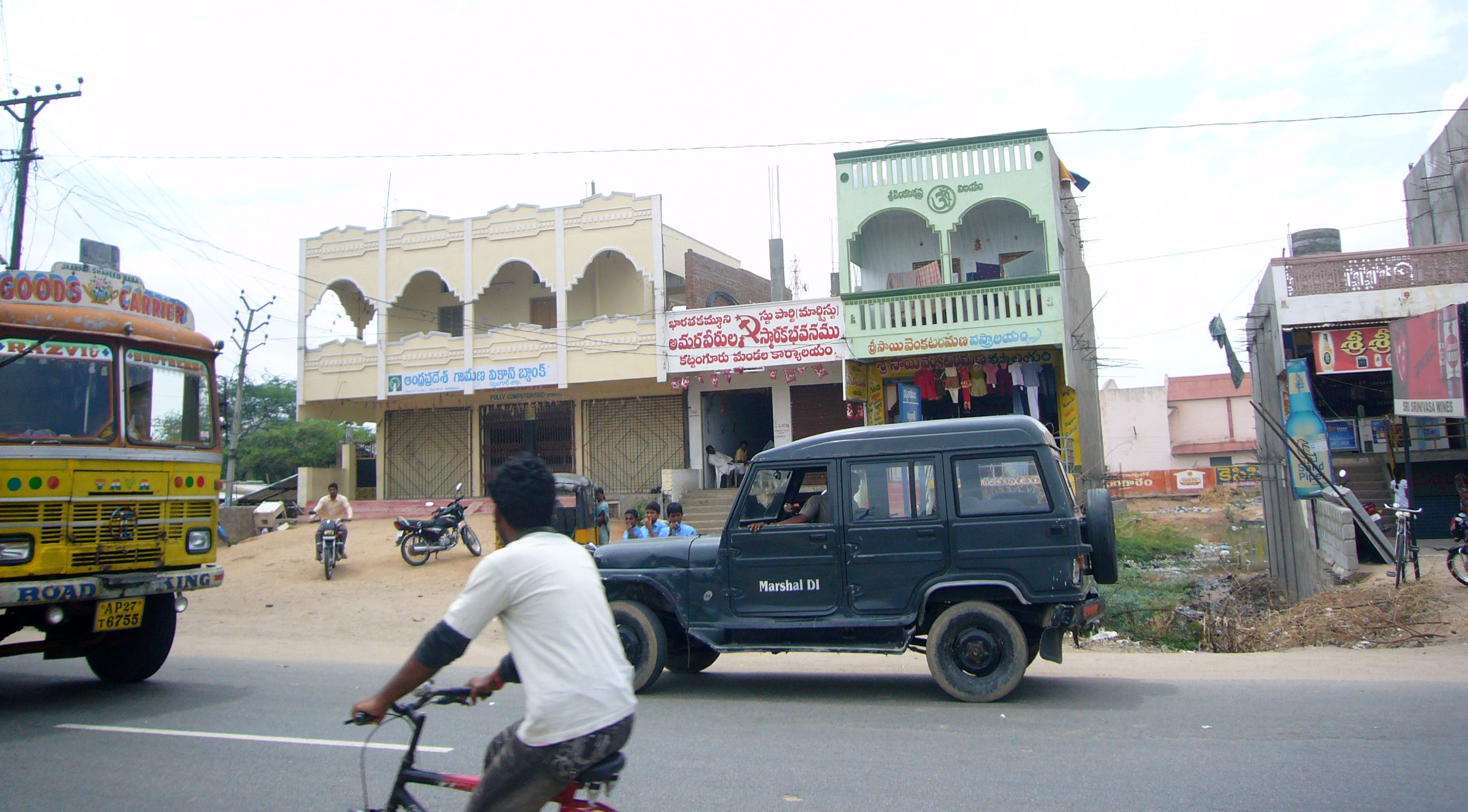
Buildings on the highway along Kattangoor village

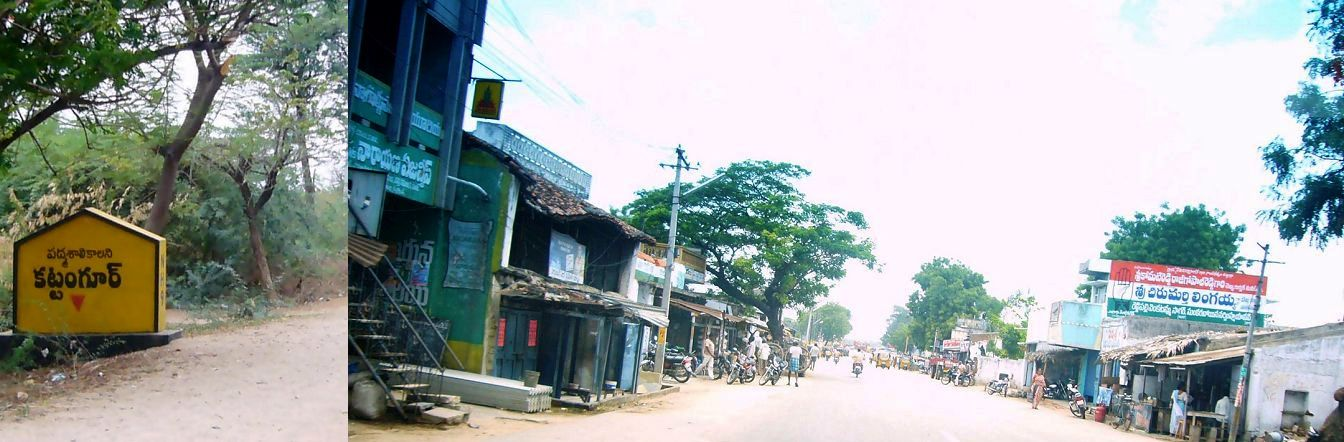
Village milestone and a street in Kattangoor

Kattangoor is a village in Nalgonda district of state of Telangana, India. It is located in Kattangur, mandal of the Nalgonda division.

== History ==
During antiquity and the Middle Ages, the region now known as Telangana was ruled by multiple major Hindustani powers such as the Mauryans, Satavahanas, Chalukyas, Cholas, Rashtrakutas, Kakatiyas, Delhi Sultanate, Bahmani Sultanate, Golconda Sultanate. During the 16th and 17th centuries, the region was ruled by the Mughals of India.

During the 18th century and the British Raj, Telangana was ruled by the Nizam of Hyderabad. In 1823, the Nizams lost control over Northern Circars (Coastal Andhra) and Ceded Districts (Rayalseema), which were handed over to the East India Company. The annexation by the British of the Northern Circars deprived Hyderabad State, the Nizam's dominion, of the considerable coastline it formerly had, to that of a landlocked princely state with territories in the central Deccan, bounded on all sides by British India. Thereafter, the Northern Circars were governed as part of Madras Presidency until India's independence in 1947, after which the presidency became India's Madras state.

The Hyderabad state joined the Union of India in 1948 after an Indian military invasion. In 1956, the Hyderabad State was dissolved as part of the linguistic reorganisation of states and Telangana was merged with the Telugu-speaking Andhra State (part of the Madras Presidency during the British Raj) to form Andhra Pradesh. A peasant-driven movement began to advocate for separation from Andhra Pradesh starting in the early 1950s, and continued until Telangana was granted statehood on 2 June 2014 under the leadership of K. Chandrashekar Rao.

Along with neighboring Nakrekal village, Kattangoor was captured from Hyderabad State by the Indian Army's Punjab Regiment on 17 September 1948.

== Demographics ==
The largest percentage of the Telangana population is Hindu. Prior to the annexation of Hyderabad State by India, Muslims formed a significant portion of Kattangoor's population, and Kattangoor was a strong center for Razakars.

== Economy ==
The economy of Telangana is the eighth-largest state economy in India with ₹9.7 trillion (US$100 billion) in gross domestic product and a per capita GDP of ₹228,000 (US$2,400). Telangana ranks 22nd among Indian states in human development index.

The economy of Telangana is mainly driven by agriculture. Two important rivers of India, the Godavari and Krishna, flow through the state, providing irrigation, and rice is the major food crop. Other important crops are cotton, sugar cane, mango, and tobacco. Recently, crops used for vegetable oil production such as sunflower and peanuts have gained favor. The area around Kattangoor also produces cattle.

== Government ==
Telangana is governed by a parliamentary system of representative democracy, and Universal suffrage is granted to residents. There are three branches of government.

Executive authority is vested in the Council of Ministers headed by the Chief Minister, although the titular head of government is the Governor. The governor is the head of state appointed by the President of India. The leader of the party or coalition with a majority in the Legislative Assembly is appointed as the chief minister by the governor, and the Council of Ministers are appointed by the governor on the advice of the chief minister. The Council of Ministers reports to the Legislative Assembly.

The legislature, the Telangana Legislative Assembly and the Telangana Legislative Council, consists of elected members and special office bearers such as the Speaker and Deputy Speaker, that are elected by the members. Assembly meetings are presided over by the speaker or the deputy speaker in the speaker's absence. The Assembly is bicameral with 119 Members of the Legislative Assembly and 40 Member of the Legislative Council. Terms of office run for five years unless the Assembly is dissolved prior to the completion of the term. The Legislative Council is a permanent body with one-third members retiring every two years.

The judiciary is composed of the High Court of Judicature at Hyderabad and a system of lower courts.

Auxiliary authorities known as panchayats, for which local body elections are regularly held, govern local village affairs. The state contributes seats to Lok Sabha.

== Education ==
According to the 2011 census, Telangana's literacy rate was 66.46%. Male literacy and female literacy were 74.95% and 57.92%, respectively. Hyderabad district led with 80.96%.

In a 2019 report, the Key Indicators of Household Social Consumption on Education in India, by the Ministry of Statistics and Programme Implementation, indicated that Telangana has a literacy rate of 72.8% which is the fourth lowest of large states. It also has the second lowest literacy rate among rural women at 53.7%. About 37.1% of the population aged 3–35 years received free education at pre-primary and higher levels in Telangana.

== Culture ==
The population of Telangana speaks Telugu language, though some of the population also speaks Urdu. Telangana culture combines cultural customs from Persian traditions, embedded during the rule of the region by the Mughals, Qutub Shahis and Nizams, along with prominent and predominantly South Indian traditions and customs. The state has a rich tradition in classical music, painting and folk arts such as Burra Katha, shadow puppet show, and Perini Shivatandavam, Gusadi Dance, Kolatam.

The region is known for historical structures. Kattangoor has three main temples: Mahalaxmi temple, Hanuman temple along with shivalayam, and the Saibaba & Manikanta temple. The Kattangoor village is famous for muramuras, a spicy puffed rice dish.

== Transportation ==
The Telangana state is well connected with other states by means of road, rail and airways. The Telangana State Road Transport Corporation (TSRTC) is the major public transport corporation that connects all the cities and villages. Mahatma Gandhi Bus Station (M.G.B.S) in Hyderabad is one of the largest bus stand in Asia.

The NH 65 Highway passes through Kattangoor, providing easy access for business or tourism. The village has a public bus service, and also a nearby railway station.
