= Nakrekal =

- Municipality Town
- Location in Telangana, India Nakrekal (India)
- Coordinates: 17.16469834°N 79.42747827°E
- Country: India
- State: Telangana
- District: Nalgonda

Area
  - Total: 18.26 km^{2} (7.05 sq mi)

Population (2025)
  - Total: 56,000
  - Density: 3,100/km^{2} (7,900/sq mi)

Languages
  - Official: Telugu
- Time zone: UTC+5:30 (IST)
- PIN: 508211
- Telephone code: 08682
- Vehicle registration: TG 05
- Lok Sabha constituency: Bhongir Lok Sabha constituency
- Vidhan Sabha constituency: Nakrekal Assembly constituency
- Website: telangana.gov.in

Nakrekal is a town and a municipality in Nalgonda district of the Indian state of Telangana. It is located in Nakrekal mandal in Nalgonda division..It is located on the National Highway 65 (NH65) and about 26km from Suryapet, 19km from Nalgonda and 43km from Miryalaguda.

== Geography ==
Nakrekal is located at 17.16469834°N 79.42747827°E. It has an average elevation of 240 metres (790 ft).

== Nearest Cities ==
- Suryapet-24 km
- Nalgonda-19 km
- Miryalaguda-43 km
- Hyderabad-109 km

== Transport ==
NH 565 connects the town with Erpedu road in Andhra Pradesh..It has good bus facility for Nalgonda, Suryapet and Hyderabad.
