= Nalgonda district =

Nalgonda district Nallagonda Or Neelagiri
- District of Telangana
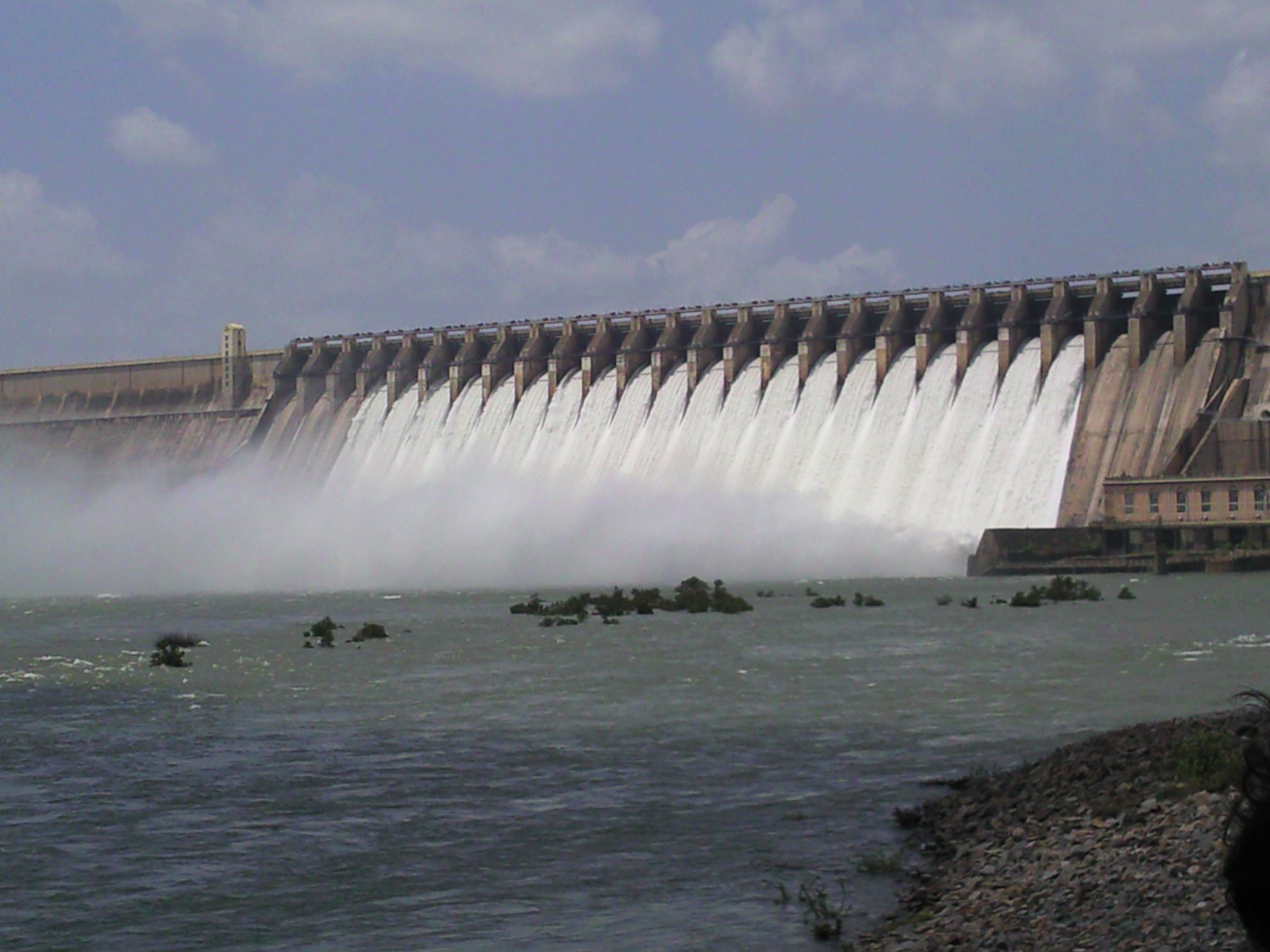

- Location in Telangana
- Nalgonda district
- Country: India
- State: Telangana
- Division: Chandur, Devarakonda, Miryalaguda, Nalgonda
- Headquarters: Nalgonda
- Mandalas: 33

Government
  - District collector: Sri Chandrashekar Badugu (IAS)
  - Parliamentary constituencies: Nalgonda
  - Assembly constituencies: 6 assembly seats
  - Superintendent of Police: Sharath Chandra Pawar, IPS

Area
  - Total: 7,122 km^{2} (2,750 sq mi)

Population (2011)
  - Total: 1,618,416
  - Density: 227.2/km^{2} (588.6/sq mi)

Demographics
  - Literacy: 65.05
- Time zone: UTC+05:30 (IST)
- Vehicle registration: TG–05
- Major highways: NH-65, NH 365, NH-565, NH 167, NH365B
- Average annual precipitation: Normal rainfall 751.0 mm; average rainfall 670.2 mm
- Website: nalgonda.telangana.gov.in

Nalgonda district is a district in the Telangana state of India. Nalgonda district has the highest number of mandals in the state with 33 mandals. The district shares boundaries with Suryapet, Rangareddy, Yadadri and Nagarkurnool districts and with the state boundary of Andhra Pradesh. In terms of area, Nalgonda is the 2nd largest district with an area of 7222.78 km^{2} in the state. The district headquarters is Nalgonda.

== Etymology ==
Nalgonda is derived from two Telugu words Nalla (Black) & Konda (Hills) i.e. Black Hills.

== History ==
Nalgonda was earlier referred to as Neelagiri, the name given by some local rulers and the name was changed to Nallagonda only after its conquest by Allauddin Bahaman Shah, the founder of Bahmani Sultanate.

The district had a major role in the Telangana Rebellion.

== Geography ==
The district is spread over an area of 7,122 square kilometres (2,750 sq mi).

== Demographics ==
Religion in Nalgonda district (2011)
Hinduism	92.70%
Islam	5.82%
Christianity	1.04%
Other or not stated	0.44%

As of 2011 Census of India, Nalgonda district has a population of 1,618,416. Nalgonda has a sex ratio of 978 females per 1000 males and a literacy rate of 63.75%. 181,996 (11.25%) were under 6 years of age. 368,303 (22.76%) lived in urban areas. Scheduled Castes and Scheduled Tribes made up 292,951 (18.10%) and 209,252 (12.93%) of the population respectively.

Languages of Nalgonda district (2011)
1. Telugu (81.8%)
2. Lambadi (11.9%)
3. Urdu (5.51%)
4. Others (0.83%)

According to the 2011 census, 81.75% of the population spoke Telugu, 11.91% Lambadi and 5.51% Urdu as their first language.

The Krishna River, Musi River, Aleru, Peddavagu, Dindi River, Halia River and Paleru flow through the Nalgonda district.

== Economy ==
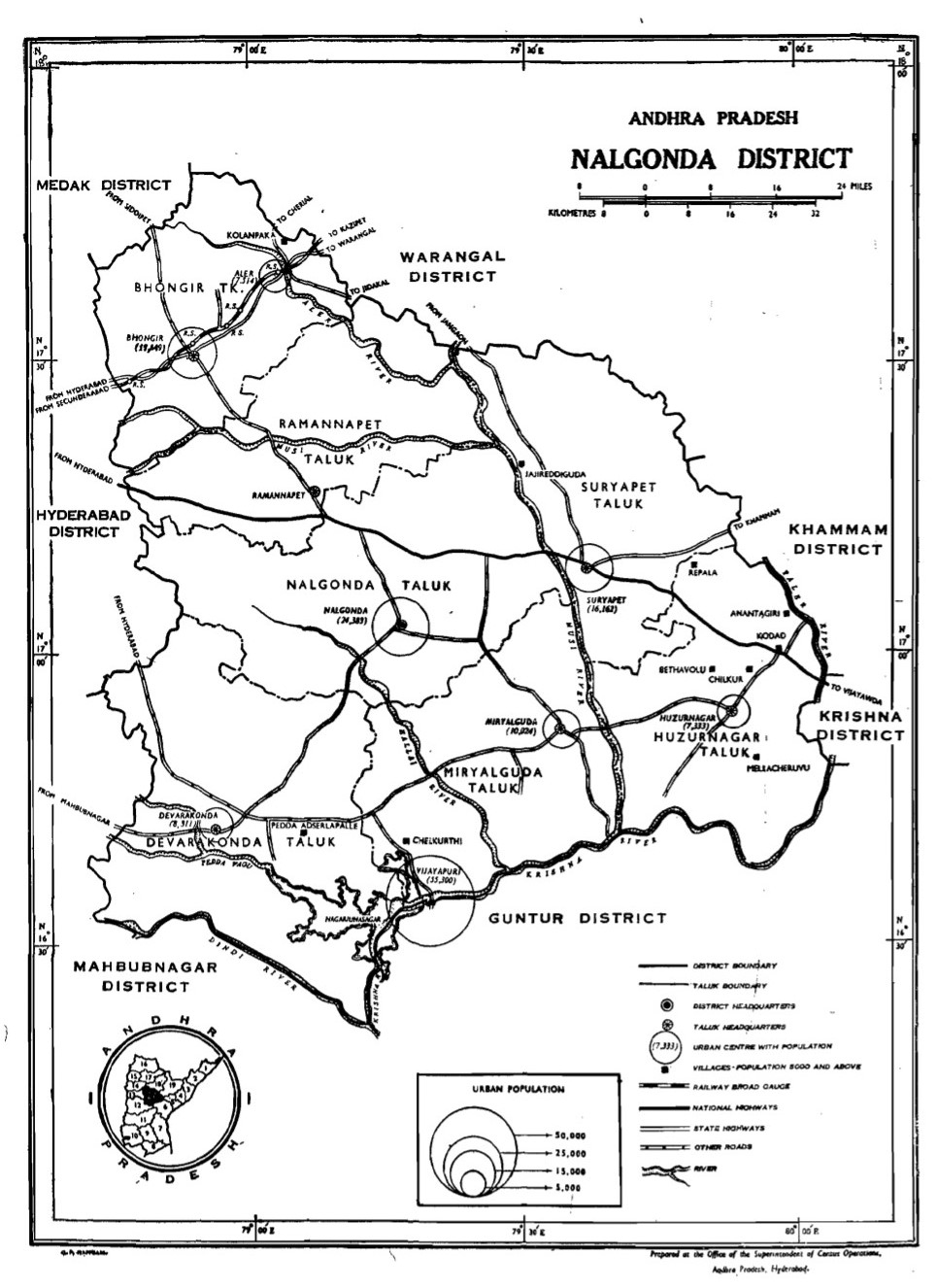
Nalgonda District with Talukas until 1979

In 2006 the Indian government named Nalgonda one of the country's 250 poorest districts (out of a total of 640). It is one of the thirty-three districts in Telangana currently receiving funds from the Backward Regions Grant Fund Programme (BRGF).

== Agriculture ==
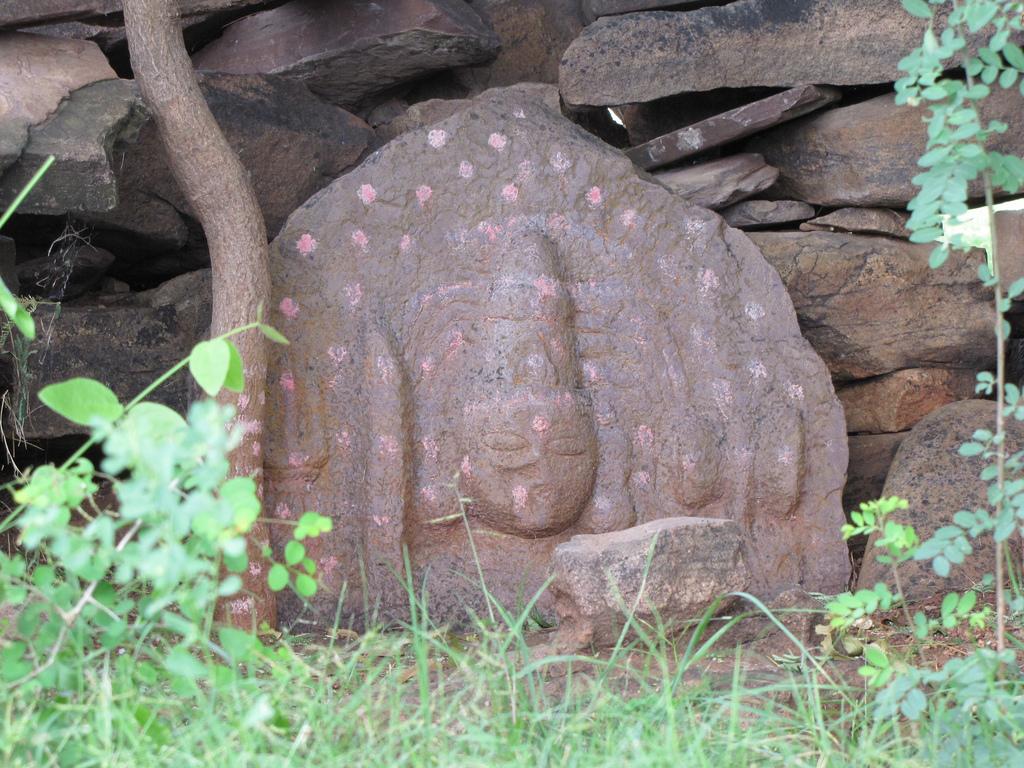
Goddess Deity relief near Nagarjunakonda

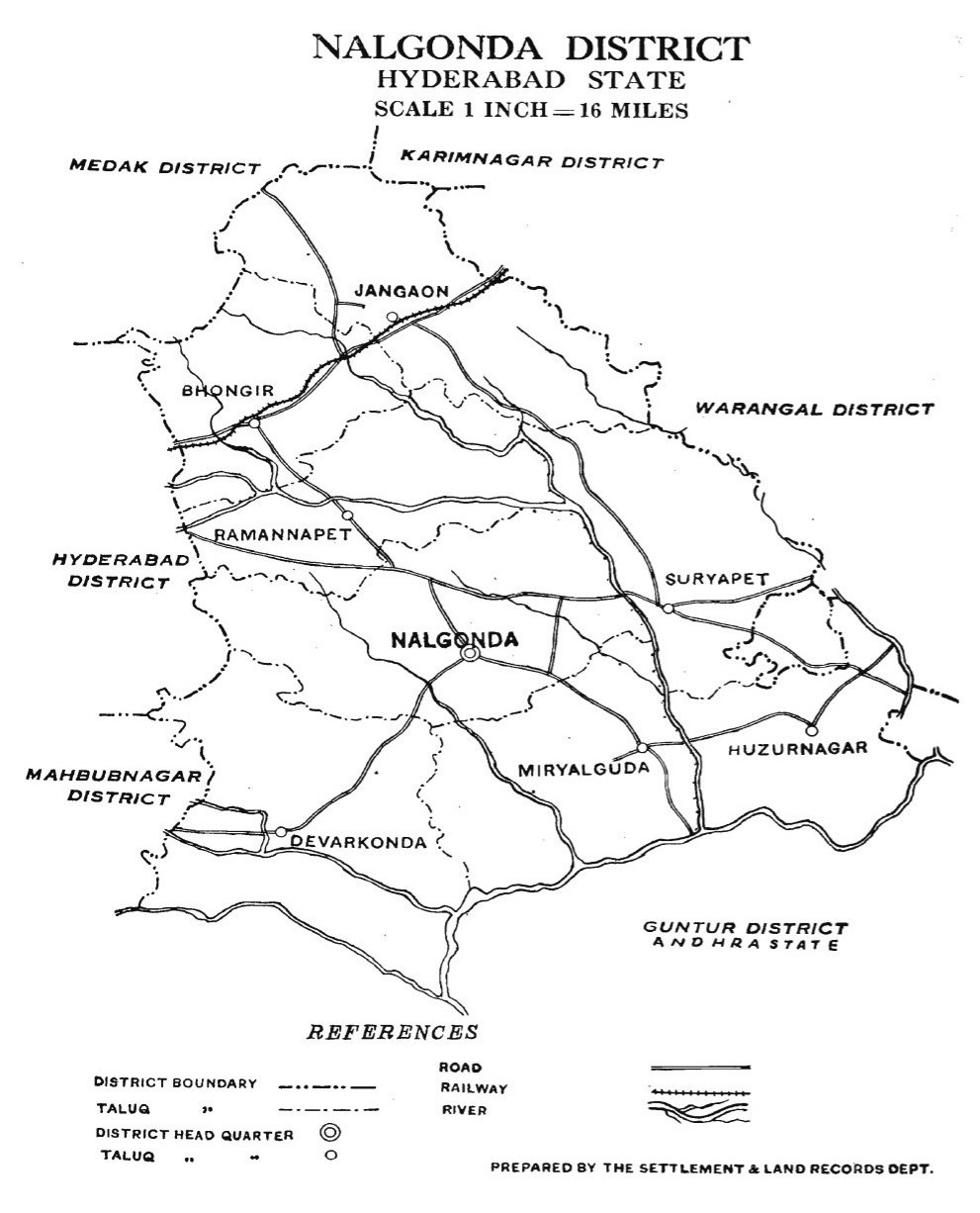
Nalgonda District 1905 to 1953

Nalgonda district is an agrarian district with water resources from the rivers, lakes, canals and ponds. The wells and borewells also support farming in the district. The farmers mainly grow crops such as paddy, and cotton. The climate of the district supports the production of paddy and groundnut seeds.

== Geography ==
=== Cities ===
- Nalgonda
- Miryalaguda

=== Towns ===
- Chandur
- Devarakonda
- Nakrekal
- Munugode
- Nagarjuna Sagar

== Power projects ==
Telangana State Power Generation Corporation Limited (TSGENCO) is building Yadadri Thermal Power Plant in Nalgonda District. The 4000 megawatt thermal project is coming up in a phased manner at Veerlapalem in the district. Bharat Heavy Electricals Limited (BHEL) is appointed as the engineering, procurement, and construction (EPC) contractor for the project.

== Notable places in district ==
- Kurmagiri Narasimha Swamy Temple, Palem (16 Miles) from Nalgonda
- Latif Saheb Hill in Nalgonda
- Sri Chaya Someshwara Temple - 5 km (3.1 mi) from Nalgonda
- Udaya Samudram -6 km (3.7 mi) from Nalgonda
- Cheruvugattu Shivalayam - 14 km (8.6 mi) from Nalgonda
- Devarkonda Fort - 60 km (37 mi) from Nalgonda
- Nagarjuna Sagar Dam - 64 km (40 mi) from Nalgonda

== Administrative divisions ==
The district is divided into four revenue divisions: Nalgonda, Miryalaguda, Chandur and Devarakonda. These are sub-divided into 33 mandals and has 565 villages. Sri Chandrashekar Badugu, IAS is the present collector of the district.

=== Mandals ===
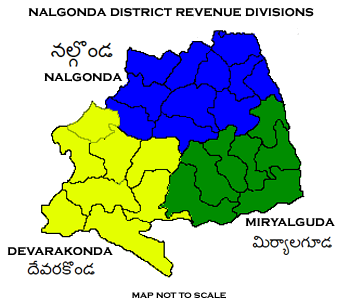
Nalgonda District Revenue divisions

The below table categorizes the mandals into their respective revenue divisions in the district:

Sr No.	Nalgonda Division	Miryalaguda Division	Devarakonda Division	Chandur Division
1	Chityal	Dameracherla	Chandampet	Chandur
2	Kanagal	Miryalaguda	Chintapally	Munugode
3	Kattangur	Vemulapally	Devarakonda	Gattuppal
4	Nakrekal	Anumula Haliya	Gundlapally	Nampally
5	Nalgonda	Nidamanur	Kondamallapally	Marriguda
6	Narketpally	Peddavoora	Pedda Adiserla Pally	
7	Shaligowraram	Tripuraram	Neredugommu	
8	Thipparthy	Madugulapally	Gurrampode	
9	Kethepally	Thirumalagiri Sagar	Gudipally	
10	Ammanabolu	Adavi Devulapalli		

== See also ==
- Chandur
- Chinna Kaparthy
- Dandampally
- List of districts in Telangana
