= Deaths in August 1988 =

The following is a list of notable deaths in August 1988.

Entries for each day are listed alphabetically by surname. A typical entry lists information in the following sequence:

- Name, age, country of citizenship at birth, subsequent country of citizenship (if applicable), reason for notability, cause of death (if known), and reference.

== August 1988 ==
=== 1 ===
- Zoltán Bitskey, 84, Hungarian Olympic swimmer (1924).
- Orville Carlisle, 71, American inventor of the model rocket motor.
- Red Coffey, 65, American voice actor and comedian (Tom and Jerry).
- John Dearden, 80, American Roman Catholic cardinal, Archbishop of Detroit, pancreatic cancer.
- Emanoil Dumitrescu, 81, Romanian footballer.
- Florence Eldridge, 86, American actress (Long Day's Journey into Night).
- Yoshimoto Ishin, 72, Japanese businessman and Jodo Shinshu Buddhist priest.
- Kim Yong-ki, 79, South Korean agrarian movement leader.
- Sheldon Kinser, 45, American race car driver, cancer.
- John F. Laboon, 67, American officer in the U.S. Navy and Roman Catholic chaplain.
- Steve Mills, 34, English footballer (Southampton), leukemia.
- Georges Wambst, 86, French Olympic cyclist (1924).
- Gertrude Welcker, 92, German stage and silent-screen actress (Chronicles of the Gray House, Dr. Mabuse the Gambler).

=== 2 ===
- Steve Anderson, 82, American Olympic hurdler (1928).
- Bob Berman, 89, American MLB player (Washington Senators).
- Jack Breslin, 68, American university administrator (Michigan State University).
- Joe Carcione, American consumer advocate, the "Green Grocer", intestinal cancer.
- Raymond Carver, 50, American short-story writer (What We Talk About When We Talk About Love, Cathedral), lung cancer.
- Karl Ebb, 91, Finnish racing driver and Olympic athlete (1924).
- Nityanand Kanungo, 88, Indian politician, governor of Bihar and Gujarat, member of Lok Sabha.
- Nada Klaić, 68, Croatian historian.
- Gustav Kristiansen, 84, Norwegian Olympic cyclist (1928).
- José Magriñá, 70, Cuban footballer (national team).
- Valle Resko, 78, Finnish Olympic boxer (1928, 1948).

=== 3 ===
- Lillian Bilocca, 59, British fisheries worker, known for improving safety in the fishing industry, peritoneal cancer.
- Campbell Copelin, 87, English-born Australian actor.
- Tucker McGuire, 75, American-born British film and television actress.
- Krishnaswami Ramiah, 96, Indian agricultural scientist and geneticist, director of National Rice Research Institute.
- Vic Watson, 90, English international footballer (West Ham United, England).
- Harlan Wilson, 74, American basketball player.

=== 4 ===
- Sir Allan Adair, 90, British army general.
- Brian Brake, 61, New Zealand photographer, heart attack.
- Charles B. Brownson, 74, American politician, member of the United States House of Representatives (1951–1959).
- Leonard Kuypers, 89, Dutch Olympic fencer (1928).
- Richard Leppla, 74, Nazi German fighter ace.
- Peter Lowe, 53, English cricketer.
- George Commey Mills-Odoi, 72, Ghanaian judge and Attorney General.
- Ofelia Uribe de Acosta, 87, Colombian author, editor and suffragist.
- Joe Vandeleur, 84, Indian-born Anglo-Irish British Army officer.
- Harry Lee Waterfield, 77, American politician, Lieutenant Governor of Kentucky.

=== 5 ===
- Red Davis, 80, American NFL player (Portsmouth Spartans, Philadelphia Eagles).
- James Devereux, 85, American general in the U.S. Marine Corps, member of U.S. House of Representatives (1951–1959), pneumonia.
- Colin Higgins, 47, French-Australian-American screenwriter, actor and director (Harold and Maude, 9 to 5), AIDS.
- Arif Hussain Hussaini, 41, Indian-Pakistani revolutionary leader, assassinated.
- James M. Masters Sr., 77, American general in the U.S. Marine Corps, cancer.
- Ralph Meeker, 67, American actor (Kiss Me Deadly, Paths of Glory), heart attack.
- Ralph Michaels, 86, American MLB player (Chicago Cubs).
- Gil North, 72, British author of detective stories (Cluff).
- Henry George Templar, 83, American district judge (United States District Court for the District of Kansas).

=== 6 ===
- John Bingham, 7th Baron Clanmorris, 79, English thriller, detective and spy novelist (My Name Is Michael Sibley), MI5 spy.
- Hec Farrell, 65, Australian rugby league footballer.
- Gord Garvie, 43, Canadian Olympic wrestler (1968).
- James Hervey Johnson, 87, American atheist, writer and editor of The Truth Seeker, white supremacist, heart attack.
- Anatoly Levchenko, 47, Soviet cosmonaut, brain tumour.
- Illa Martin, 88, German dendrologist, botanist, conservationist and dentist.
- Francis Ponge, 89, French poet.
- J. Skelly Wright, 77, American circuit judge, prostate cancer.

=== 7 ===
- Juraj Amšel, 63, Croatian Olympic water polo player (1948, 1952, 1956).
- George Chalmers, 79, American football player.
- David L. Hoggan, 65, American author, neo-Nazi, anti-Semite and Holocaust denier, heart attack.
- Wilfred Jackson, 82, American animator (Mickey Mouse, Silly Symphony).
- Lucio Manzin, 74, Italian Olympic equestrian (1952).
- Gajo Raffanelli, 75, Croatian footballer.
- David E. Skinner II, 67–68, American shipping heir, owner of the Space Needle and Seattle Seahawks, cancer.

=== 8 ===
- Alan Ameche, 55, American NFL player (Baltimore Colts), heart attack.
- Kid Chocolate, 78, Cuban boxer, World Junior Lightweight Champion.
- George Estregan, 49, Filipino film actor.
- Henri Frenay, 82, French military officer and member of the French Resistance.
- Violet Hackbarth, 68, American AAGPBL player.
- William Kininmonth, 83, Scottish architect.
- Félix Leclerc, 82, Canadian singer-songwriter, heart attack.
- Ragnar Lennartsson, 78, Swedish footballer.
- Liu Liangmo, 78, Chinese musician and Christian leader.
- Alan Napier, 85, English actor (Batman), pneumonia.
- Dominic Serventy, 84, Australian ornithologist, president of Royal Australasian Ornithologists Union.

=== 9 ===
- Woodrow Adams, 71, American blues guitarist and harmonica player.
- Joe Bruce, 83, Australian rules footballer.
- Jimmie Fidler, 89, American columnist, journalist and radio and television personality.
- M. Carl Holman, 69, American civil rights advocate (Civil Rights Commission), cancer.
- Giacinto Scelsi, 83, Italian composer, cerebral hemorrhage.
- Ramón Valdés, 63, Mexican actor and comedian (El Chavo del Ocho), stomach cancer.

=== 10 ===
- Arnulfo Arias, 86, Panamanian politician, President of Panama, heart attack.
- Antoine Blanchard, 77, French painter (Cafe de la Paix).
- Jean Brachet, 79, Belgian biochemist (RNA).
- Gerd Grieg, 93, Norwegian actress.
- Benny Johnson, 40, American NFL football player (Houston Oilers), heart attack.
- Guido Mannari, 43, Italian actor (The Driver's Seat), heart attack.
- Aleksander Margiste, 80, Estonian Olympic basketball player (1936).
- Havzi Nela, 54, Albanian poet, executed.
- Adela Rogers St. Johns, 94, American journalist, novelist and screenwriter, Presidential Medal of Freedom recipient.
- Paul Thek, 54, American painter and sculptor, AIDS.

=== 11 ===
- Roland Allard, 77, French Olympic alpine skier (1936).
- Nellikode Bhaskaran, 64, Indian Malayalam actor (Sarapancharam).
- John Byer, 84, Barbadian cricketer.
- Alfred Kelbassa, 63, German international footballer (STV Horst-Emscher, Borussia Dortmund, West Germany).
- Pauline Lafont, 25, French actress, hiking accident.
- James Alexander McBain, 78, Canadian politician, member of the House of Commons of Canada (1954–1965).
- K. Avukader Kutty Naha, 68, Indian politician, Deputy Chief Minister of Kerala.
- Jean-Pierre Ponnelle, 56, French opera director, pulmonary embolism following a fall.
- Anne Ramsey, 59, American actress (The Goonies, Throw Momma from the Train), cancer.
- Jack Regan, 75, Australian rules footballer (Collingwood).

=== 12 ===
- Jean-Michel Basquiat, 27, American artist (Hollywood Africans), heroin overdose.
- Bhakti Rakshak Sridhar, 92, Indian guru, writer and spiritual leader.
- Sakuta Takefushi, 82, Japanese Olympic cross-country skier (1928).

=== 13 ===
- Mel Almada, 75, Mexican Major League baseball player (Boston Red Sox).
- Fred Below, 61, American blues drummer, liver cancer.
- Per Digerud, 55, Norwegian Olympic cyclist (1960).
- Keith Hancock, 90, Australian historian and academic.
- Martin Hellinger, 84, Nazi German dentist, convicted war criminal, tasked with removing gold filling from corpses at Ravensbrück concentration camp.
- Thomas Henty, 32, English actor, haemophilia.
- John Wendell Holmes, 78, Canadian diplomat, Canadian delegate to the United Nations.
- Gajanan Jagirdar, 81, Indian film director, screenwriter and actor, heart attack.
- Peggy Mann, 69, American Big Band singer.
- Otto Passman, 88, American politician, member of U.S. House of Representatives (1947–1977), heart attack.
- William H. Phelps Jr., 85, Venezuelan ornithologist and businessman, circulatory problems.
- Pydimarri Venkata Subba Rao, 72, Indian author, author of the National Pledge of India.
- Tenor Saw, 21, Jamaican dancehall singjay, hit and run accident.
- Gordon H. Scherer, 81, American lawyer and politician, member of U.S. House of Representatives (1953–1963), heart attack.
- Edward Bennett Williams, 68, American lawyer and businessman, co-founder of Williams & Connolly, colon cancer.

=== 14 ===
- Roy Buchanan, 48, American guitarist and blues musician, suicide.
- Robert Calvert, 43, South African–born British writer, poet and musician, heart attack.
- Michael Crowder, 54, British historian and author.
- Enzo Ferrari, 90, Italian motor racing driver and car maker, leukemia.
- William Gumley, 65, Australian cricketer.
- Kōri Hisataka, 81, Japanese founder of Shōrinjiryū Kenkōkan Karate.
- Andrew Young McLean, 79, Canadian newspaper publisher and politician, member of the House of Commons of Canada (1949–1953).
- Kailas Nath Wanchoo, 85, Indian Chief Justice.
- Monroe Wheeler, 89, American publisher and museum coordinator (Museum of Modern Art), stroke.

=== 15 ===
- Bill Beason, 80, American jazz drummer.
- Barry Bingham Sr., 82, American media patriarch in Louisville, Kentucky, brain tumour.
- Rudy Collins, 54, American jazz drummer.
- Han Deqin, 95, Chinese general in the National Revolutionary Army.
- Ronald Stein, 58, American film composer, pancreatic cancer.
- Hans Heinz Stuckenschmidt, 86, German composer and music historian.
- Hartman Turnbow, 83, Mississippi orator and activist during the Civil Rights Movement.

=== 16 ===
- Rashad Barmada, 74–75, Syrian politician, Deputy Prime Minister of Syria.
- Alan Danson, 60, British Olympic cyclist (1956).
- Smokey Haangala, 38, Zambian poet and composer.
- John Hodgkins, 72, English cricketer.
- Georgi Keranov, 66, Bulgarian Olympic sports shooter (1952).
- Herbert Pagani, 44, Italian artist and musician, leukaemia.

=== 17 ===
- Lennart Bunke, 76, Swedish footballer.
- Jack Cutting, 80, American international content supervisor and animator for Walt Disney Animation Studios.
- Nino Frank, 84, Italian-born French film critic and writer, coined the term "film noir".
- Bruce Humber, 74, Canadian Olympic sprinter (1936).
- Hironobu Kaneko, 90, Japanese painter.
- Bruno Mathsson, 81, Swedish architect and furniture designer.
- Connie Meijer, 25, Dutch cyclist, heart attack.
- Franklin D. Roosevelt Jr., 74, American lawyer and politician, member of U.S. House of Representatives (1949–1955), lung cancer.
- Victoria Shaw, 53, Australian film and television actress, emphysema.
- Samuel Silkin, 70, British politician, Attorney General for England and Wales.
- Jack Straus, 58, American professional poker player, aortic aneurysm.
- Bob Troughton, 84, Australian rules footballer.
- Notable people killed in the 1988 PAF C-130B crash:
  - Akhtar Abdur Rahman, 64, Pakistani Army general.
  - Arnold Lewis Raphel, 45, American diplomat, ambassador to Pakistan.
  - Siddique Salik, 52, Pakistani army officer.
  - Muhammad Zia-ul-Haq, 64, Pakistani military officer, President of Pakistan (since 1978).

=== 18 ===
- Frederick Ashton, 83, British ballet dancer and choreographer (Symphonic Variations, Ondine).
- Felix Maria Davídek, 67, Czech Roman Catholic bishop.
- Li Gotami Govinda, 92, Indian painter, writer and composer.
- Seiryū Inoue, 56–57, Japanese photographer.
- Gary Little, 49, American judge, focus of sexual abuse allegations, suicide.
- Michael Perrin, 82, Canadian-born British scientist, directed first British atomic bomb program.
- Jessica Powers, 83, American poet and nun, stroke.
- Ernst Simon, 88, German educator and religious philosopher.

=== 19 ===
- Cyril Adams, 90, English cricketer and RAF officer.
- Clary Anderson, 77, American football and baseball player and coach.
- Enrico Cerulli, 90, Italian scholar of Somali and Ethiopian studies, Governor of Scioa and Harar, ambassador to Iran.
- Patrick Donner, 83, British Member of Parliament.
- Bjørn Elvenes, 44, Norwegian Olympic ice hockey player (1964).
- Don Haggerty, 74, American actor (The Life and Legend of Wyatt Earp, Sands of Iwo Jima).
- Russ Hathaway, 92, American NFL player.
- Johan Møller Warmedal, 74, Norwegian politician.
- Jerome Zerbe, 84, American photographer.

=== 20 ===
- Jean-Paul Aron, 63, French writer and journalist, AIDS.
- John Cock, 70, Australian-born British WWII flying ace.
- Harry Dingley, 85, British Olympic boxer (1924).
- Stuart Leary, 55, South African footballer and cricketer.
- Carlos Marcenaro, 76, Peruvian Olympic middle-distance runner (1936).
- Leon McAuliffe, 71, American Western swing guitarist.
- Joan G. Robinson, 78, British author and illustrator of children's books (When Marnie Was There).
- Lazarus Salii, 51, Palau politician, President of Palau, suicide.

=== 21 ===
- H. G. Adler, 78, Czech-English poet and novelist, Holocaust survivor, heart failure.
- Marcel Chauvenet, 82, French sculptor.
- Teddy Diaz, 25, Filipino musician and composer (The Dawn), murdered.
- Ray Eames, 78, American artist and designer.
- Chris Gittins, 86, British actor (The Archers).
- Eino Kirjonen, 55, Finnish Olympic ski jumper (1956, 1960).
- Stuart Leary, 55, South African footballer (Charlton Athletic) and first-class cricketer, suicide.
- Andrew McDonald, 89, American college football and basketball player and coach (Springfield/ SW Missouri State Bears).
- Jack McGill, 78, Canadian NHL player (Montreal Canadiens).
- Henryk Mikunda, 71, Polish footballer.
- Jerry Warren, 63, American film director, screenwriter and actor (Teenage Zombies), lung cancer.

=== 22 ===
- Bruno Bianchi, 84, Italian Olympic sailor (1936, 1948).
- Bob Daughters, 74, American MLB player (Boston Red Sox).
- Rejhan Demirdžić, 61, Bosnian half of comedy duo Momo and Uzeir.
- Milo Gmür, 69–70, Swiss Olympic equestrian (1956).

=== 23 ===
- Gerald Drayson Adams, 88, Canadian-American business executive and film writer (Dead Reckoning, The Big Steal).
- José Manuel de Sousa e Faro Nobre de Carvalho, 76, Portuguese army general, Governor of Macau.
- C. Desmond Greaves, 74, English Marxist activist and historian.
- Laud Humphreys, 57, American sociologist and Episcopal priest, lung cancer.
- Josef Klehr, 83, Nazi German SS-Oberscharführer, concentration camp supervisor and war criminal.
- Hans Lewy, 83, Prussian-born American mathematician (partial differential equations), leukemia.
- Alf Martinsen, 76, Norwegian Olympic footballer (1936).
- Menotti Del Picchia, 96, Brazilian poet, journalist and painter.
- Jack Sher, 75, American newspaper columnist and film writer (Goodbye, Raggedy Ann), respiratory and heart problems.
- Robert Walcott, 78, American historian.

=== 24 ===
- Pierre Béchu, 29, French Olympic ice dancer (1984).
- C. Chhunga, 72, Indian politician, Chief Minister of Mizoram.
- Leonard Frey, 49, American actor (Fiddler on the Roof), AIDS.
- Charlie Harbour, 64, Australian rules footballer.
- Kenneth Leighton, 58, British composer and pianist, oesophageal cancer.
- Abu Jafar Shamsuddin, 77, Bangladeshi writer.
- Nat Stuckey, 54, American country singer ("Sweet Thang"), lung cancer.

=== 25 ===
- Caziel, 82, Polish-born artist.
- Price Daniel, 77, American jurist and politician, Governor of Texas, stroke.
- Françoise Dolto, 79, French pediatrician and psychoanalyst, pulmonary fibrosis.
- Percy Foreman, 86, American criminal defense attorney (James Earl Ray), cardiac arrest.
- Henry Joseph Gallagher, 73, British soldier in the Korean War (Distinguished Conduct Medal).
- Jimmy Lloyd, 69, American actor (The Sea Hound).
- Irving Mansfield, 80, American producer, publicist and writer, heart attack.
- Art Rooney, 87, American owner of Pittsburgh Steelers NFL team, stroke.
- Ron Slocum, 43, American MLB player (San Diego Padres).
- Karlo Toth, 81, Yugoslav Olympic wrestler (1936).

=== 26 ===
- Del Bjork, 74, American NFL player (Chicago Bears).
- Donald De Lue, 90, American sculptor (Harvey S. Firestone Memorial).
- Jack Dempsey, 76, American NFL player (Pittsburgh Pirates, Philadelphia Eagles).
- Kitty Doner, 92, American vaudeville performer.
- Hans Esser, 79, German Olympic fencer (1936, 1952).
- Oscar Marzaroli, 55, Italian-born Scottish photographer, cancer.
- Carlos Paião, 30, Portuguese singer and songwriter, car accident.
- Fred Peart, 74, British politician, leader of the Houses of Lords and Commons.
- Milton Sperling, 76, American film producer and screenwriter, owner of United States Pictures, cancer.

=== 27 ===
- Lala Aragami, 65, Indian poet.
- Stan Ashby, 81, British Olympic middle-distance runner (1928).
- Jinavajiralongkorn, 91, Supreme Patriarch of Thailand.
- Max Black, 79, Azerbaijani-born British-American philosopher of language, mathematics, science and art, heart complications.
- Charles Farrell, 88, Irish-born stage, film and television actor.
- Gunther von Fritsch, 82, Austro-Hungarian born American film director (The Curse of the Cat People), stroke.
- Irene Higginbotham, 70, American songwriter and concert pianist ("Good Morning Heartache").
- John Lie, 77, Indonesian Navy rear admiral, stroke.
- Mario Montenegro, 60, Filipino film actor, heart attack.
- John Riordan, 85, American mathematician and author (combinatorics), Alzheimer's disease.
- William Sargant, 81, British psychiatrist (electroconvulsive therapy).
- Costas Taktsis, 60, Greek writer, murdered.
- Benjamin Willis, 86, American educator and school administrator, heart attack.

=== 28 ===
- Hazel Dawn, 98, American actress (The Pink Lady).
- Paul Grice, 75, British philosopher of language.
- Josef Hamberger, 58, Austrian Olympic boxer (1952).
- Guy Hocquenghem, 41, French writer and philosopher, AIDS.
- Jean Marchand, 69, Canadian trade unionist and politician, Member of Parliament, Secretary of State for Canada.
- Ricardo Massana, 90, Spanish Olympic rower (1924).
- Max Shulman, 69, American writer and humorist (Dobie Gillis), bone cancer.
- Paul Whitelaw, 78, New Zealand cricketer.

=== 29 ===
- Ray Baxter, 84, Australian rules footballer.
- David A. Hargrave, 42, American game designer and writer of fantasy and science fiction role-playing games (Arduin).
- Horace Henderson, 83, American jazz pianist, organist and bandleader.
- Wilfred Johnson, 52, American mobster, member of Gambino crime family, murdered.
- Charles Johnston, 92, American MLB umpire.
- Algirdas Klimaitis, 77–78, Lithuanian paramilitary commander, antisemite (Kaunas pogrom).
- Gaston Leroux, 75, Canadian NHL player (Montreal Canadiens).
- Mykola Lukash, 68, Ukrainian literary translator, cancer.
- Lưu Quang Vũ, 40, Vietnamese playwright and poet, traffic collision.
- Abuna Takla Haymanot, 70, Ethiopian patriarch of the Ethiopian Orthodox Tewahedo Church.
- Xuân Quỳnh, 45, Vietnamese poet, car crash.

=== 30 ===
- James N. Black, 48, American jazz drummer.
- Charles Stephen Booth, 91, Canadian politician, member of the House of Commons of Canada (1940–1945).
- Eren Eyüboğlu, 75, Romanian-born Turkish artist.
- Nikolai Fefilov, 42, Soviet serial killer, strangled in jail.
- Richard Hamblin, 81, British RAF pilot, fought in the Battle of Britain.
- Batsheva Katznelson, 90–91, Israeli politician, member of the Knesset (1951–1955).
- Sir Jack Marshall, 76, New Zealand politician, Prime Minister of New Zealand.
- Helenus Milmo, 80, Irish lawyer in Britain and High Court judge.
- Leonidas Proaño, 78, Ecuadorian prelate, Bishop of Riobamba.

=== 31 ===
- John Daley, 101, American MLB player (St. Louis Browns).
- Grace Eldering, 87, American public health scientist (whooping cough vaccine).
- Lin Jaldati, 75, Dutch-born, East German-based singer, Holocaust survivor.
- Antti Koskinen, 59, Finnish Olympic sports shooter (1964).
- Vasil Mzhavanadze, 85, Georgian politician, First Secretary of the Georgian Communist Party.
- Danny Weinberg, 60, American NASCAR driver.
- Walt Wollermann, 80, Australian rules footballer.

=== Unknown date ===
- Surat Alley, 82–83, Indian trade unionist and political activist in Britain.
