= National symbols of India =

The Government of India has designated official national symbols that represent the Republic of India. These symbols serve as the representation of the country's identity. When India obtained independence from the British Raj on 15 August 1947, the Tricolour flag officially became the first national symbol of the Dominion of India. The Indian rupee, which was in circulation earlier, was adopted as the official legal tender after independence. The State Emblem with the motto Satyameva Jayate was adopted later on 30 December 1947. The National Anthem and Song were adopted two days before the Constitution of India was adopted on 26 January 1950. After India became a republic following the enactment of the Constitution, the national symbols officially came to represent the Republic of India. The last to be adopted as a national symbol was the national microbe, Lactobacillus delbrueckii, in October 2012.

== List of national and official symbols ==
National symbols of India
Symbol	Name	Image	Adopted	Notes
Official name	Republic of India (Bhārata Gaṇarājya)		26 January 1950	The Constitution of India uses the official names of 'India' and 'Bharat'. The name "India" is derived from the Classical Latin India, a reference to the region beyond the Indus River. In turn, the name "India" was derived successively from Hellenistic Greek India (Ἰνδία), ancient Greek Indos (Ἰνδός), Old Persian Hindush (an eastern province of the Achaemenid Empire), and ultimately from its cognate, the Sanskrit Sindhu, or "river", specifically the Indus River and, by implication, its settled basin. The term "Bharat" (Bhārat), mentioned in ancient Hindu literature, is used in several Indian languages. Though Vedic literature uses the word to denote the Bharatha people, the earliest use of the word to represent a larger territory was in the first century BCE. It is derived from the region Bharatavarsha ruled by King Bharatha, whose name literally means "the shining one". A modern rendering of the historical name, Bharat became a native name for India in the mid-20th century after its mention in the Constitution.
National flag	Flag of India		15 August 1947 (Dominion of India) 26 January 1950 (Republic of India)	The Indian flag is a horizontal rectangular tricolour with equally sized deep saffron at the top, white in the middle, and India green at the bottom with the Dharma chakra, a 24-spoke wheel, in navy blue at its centre. The ratio of the width of the flag to its length is two to three. Saffron indicates strength and courage, white represents peace, green expresses fertility, growth and auspiciousness, with the chakra symbolising truth. The flag was designed based on the Swaraj flag design proposed by Pingali Venkayya. The tricolour flag was adopted by the Constituent Assembly of India on 22 July 1947. It was unfurled by India's first prime minister, Jawaharlal Nehru, on 15 August 1947.
National emblem	State Emblem of India		30 December 1947 (Dominion of India) 26 January 1950 (Republic of India)	The National Emblem is an adaptation of the Lion Capital of Ashoka at Sarnath consisting of four Asiatic lions standing back to back, symbolising power, courage, confidence, and faith. The lions are mounted on a circular abacus over a bell-shaped lotus. The abacus has a frieze carrying the reliefs of an elephant, a galloping horse, a bull, and a lion with a Dharma Chakra in the middle. The motto "Satyameva Jayate" (English: Truth Alone Triumphs) is a quote taken from the Mundaka Upanishad, which forms part of the sacred Hindu literature of the Vedas. It is inscribed below the abacus in the Devanagari script as a part of the State Emblem. The emblem was adopted by the Constituent Assembly on 30 December 1947. The emblem in its present form was designed by Dinanath Bhargava when the Constitution of India was adopted on 26 January 1950.
National motto	Satyameva Jayate ("Truth Alone Triumphs")		30 December 1947 (Dominion of India) 26 January 1950 (Republic of India)	
National anthem	Jana Gana Mana ("Thou Art the Ruler of the Minds of All People")		24 January 1950 (Dominion of India) 26 January 1950 (Republic of India)	"Jana Gana Mana" is taken from Bharoto Bhagyo Bidhata, composed in Bengali by Rabindranath Tagore on 11 December 1911. It was first publicly sung on 27 December 1911 in Calcutta. The first stanza of the song was adopted by the Constituent Assembly of India as the National Anthem on 24 January 1950. The National Anthem is played in approximately 52 seconds.
National song	Vande Mataram ("Mother, I bow to thee!")		24 January 1950 (Dominion of India) 26 January 1950 (Republic of India)	Vande Mataram is a Sanskrit poem written by Bankim Chandra Chatterjee, first published in 1882 as part of the Bengali novel Anandamath. The poem played a vital role in the Indian independence movement and gained political significance when it was recited by Rabindranath Tagore in 1896. The first two verses of the song were adopted as the National Song of India On 24 January 1950 by the Constituent Assembly of India.
National days	Independence Day		15 August 1947	The Indian Independence Act 1947 was passed by the British Parliament in July 1947. The Constituent Assembly of India met at 11 pm on 14 August in the Constitution Hall in New Delhi. During this meeting, which was chaired by Rajendra Prasad, Jawaharlal Nehru delivered his "Tryst with Destiny" speech, proclaiming India's independence. The Dominion of India became an independent country on 15 August 1947.
National days	Republic Day	changed to vector image	26 January 1950	Republic Day commemorates the adoption of the Constitution of India and the country's transition to a republic on 26 January 1950. The date was chosen as the Indian National Congress had proclaimed Purna Swaraj (complete independence) on that day in 1930.
National days	Gandhi Jayanti		2 October	Gandhi Jayanti is celebrated to mark the birthday of Mahatma Gandhi. Gandhi espoused the philosophy of nonviolent resistance, played a key role in the Indian Independence movement and, is regarded as the "Father of the Nation".
Oath of allegiance	National Pledge		26 January 1965	It was written in Telugu by Pydimarri Venkata Subba Rao in 1962. The English version of the same was later adopted as the National Pledge. The Central Advisory Board on Education directed that the pledge be recited in schools starting 26 January 1965.
National currency	Indian Rupee		15 August 1947 15 July 2010 (symbol)	Indian rupee (ISO code: INR) is the official currency of India, and its issuance is controlled by the Reserve Bank of India. The word "Rupee" is derived from rupya or rūpiya, which were used to denote various coins in use since the fourth century BCE. The Indian rupee symbol, adopted in July 2010, is a combination of the Devanagari letter "Ra" and the Roman letter "R", and features two parallel horizontal lines at the top that represent the National Flag and indicate equality.
National calendar	Indian National Calendar		22 March 1957	The Indian National Calendar, based on the Shaka era Hindu calendar, was adopted on 22 March 1957. The calendar has 365 days across 12 months. It is used, alongside the Gregorian calendar, by The Gazette of India, in news broadcasts by All India Radio, and in calendars and communications issued by the Government of India.
National animal	Bengal tiger (Panthera tigris)		April 1973	The Bengal tiger was chosen as the national animal in a meeting of the National Board for Wildlife in 1972 and was officially adopted in April 1973. It was chosen over the Asiatic lion due to the wider presence of the tiger across India. The tiger is one of the big cats with prominent black stripes on a yellow coat and represents grace, strength, agility, and power. As of 2023, India was home to almost 75% of the world's wild tiger population.
National bird	Indian peafowl (Pavo cristatus)		1 February 1963	The Indian peafowl was designated as the national bird of India in February 1963. The peafowl is a bird indigenous to the Indian subcontinent. The males are larger than the females, and feature a blue neck, and a spectacular long train made up of elongated upper-tail covert feathers with colourful eyespots, which they raise into an arched fan during courtship.
National heritage animal	Indian elephant (Elephas maximus indicus)		22 October 2010	The Indian elephant is the largest terrestrial mammal in India and a cultural symbol throughout its range, appearing in various religious traditions and mythologies. It is native to mainland Asia, with nearly three-fourths of the population found in India. It was declared as the national heritage animal of India on 22 October 2010.
National tree	Indian Banyan (Ficus benghalensis)		1950	The Indian banyan is a large tree native to the Indian subcontinent that produces aerial roots from its branches, which grow downwards, eventually becoming trunks. Because of this characteristic and its longevity, this tree is considered immortal and is an integral part of the myths and legends of India. The tree's structure and deep roots symbolise unity, and as the tree gives shelter to various organisms, it represents India and its people from different backgrounds.
National fruit	Mango (Mangifera indica)		1950	The mango is a large fruit tree with many varieties, believed to have originated in Northeast India. It has been cultivated in India since ancient times and is known for its deliciousness. India is the world's largest producer of mangoes and it is an economically important produce.
National aquatic animal	Ganges river dolphin (Platanista gangetica)		18 May 2010	The Ganges river dolphin is an endangered freshwater river dolphin that is endemic to the Indian subcontinent. It is found in the Ganges and Brahmaputra Rivers. It was announced as the national aquatic animal in May 2010 to raise awareness for its conservation.
National reptile	King cobra (Ophiophagus hanna)			The king cobra is the world's longest venomous snake and is endemic to Asia. The species has a diverse coloration and possesses a unique threat display, spreading its neck-flap, and raising its head upright, and hissing. The snake occupies an eminent position in the mythology and folklore of India.
National river	Ganges River		4 November 2008	The Ganges rises in the western Himalayas and flows south and east through the Indo-Gangetic Plain of North India. It has been historically important, with many cities located on its banks, and serves as a lifeline to millions of people who live along its course. It is considered as a sacred river and worshipped as a goddess in Hinduism. In November 2008, the Ganges was declared as a national river due to its close association with the lives of millions of Indians.
National microbe	Lactobacillus delbrueckii subsp. bulgaricus		18 October 2012	Lactobacillus bulgaricus is a Gram-positive bacteria used for the production of yogurt and plays a crucial role in natural processes involving fermented products. It is also considered a probiotic. It was declared as the national microbe on 18 October 2012, having been selected by children through voting.
National flower	Lotus (Nelumbo nucifera)		1950	The lotus is an aquatic plant adapted to grow in the floodplains. As lotus seeds can remain dormant and viable for many years, the plant is regarded as a symbol of longevity. It occupies a unique position in the art and mythology of ancient India and has long been an auspicious symbol of Indian culture. While the flower was believed to have been declared as the national flower of India in 1950, the government has since clarified that no official national flower exists, despite contrary claims made by government officials and ministers.
National sport	Field hockey			Field hockey is a team sport in which Indian men's team has won the gold medal at the Summer Olympic Games eight times–the most by any nation. According to a 2012 reply from the Ministry of Youth Affairs and Sports to an RTI query, there is no officially declared national game in India. However, field hockey has been listed as the national game on Indian government websites and in text books.

== See also ==
- List of Indian state symbols
