= Hisataka =

Hisataka (written: 久高) is a Japanese surname. Notable people with the surname include:

- Hiroyuki Hisataka (久高 寛之, born 1985), Japanese boxer
- Kōri Hisataka (久高 幸利, 1907–1988), Japanese karateka
- Masayuki Hisataka (久高 正之, born 1940), Japanese karateka

Hisataka (written: 久孝 or 久敬) is also a masculine Japanese given name. Notable people with the name include:

- Hisataka Fujikawa (藤川 久孝, born 1964), Japanese footballer
- Hisataka Okamoto (岡本 久敬, born 1933), Japanese footballer
- Kabayama Hisataka (樺山 久高, 1560-1634), Japanese samurai
- Hisataka Ikuta (生田 久貴, born 1962), Japanese rugby player
