= Hackbarth =

Hackbarth is a surname. Notable people with the surname include:

- Otto Hackbarth (1886–1967), American golfer and club maker
- Rudolph Hackbarth (born 1994), Brazilian handball player
- Tom Hackbarth (born 1951), American politician
- Violet Hackbarth (1919–1988), American baseball player
