= Bharoto Bhagyo Bidhata =

1911 hymn by Rabindranth Tagore

"Bharato Bhagyo Bidhata" (Bengali: ভারত ভাগ্য বিধাতা, lit. 'Dispenser of India's destiny') is a five-stanza Brahmo hymn in Bengali. It was composed and scored by Rabindranath Tagore in 1911. The first stanza of the song has been adopted as the National Anthem of India.

== History of "Jana Gana Mana" ==
The poem was first sung on the second day of the annual session of the Indian National Congress in Calcutta on 27 December 1911. The song was performed by Sarala Devi Chowdhurani, Tagore's niece, along with a group of school students, in front of prominent Congress Members like Bishan Narayan Dhar, Indian National Congress President and Ambika Charan Majumdar.

In 1912 the song was published under the title "Bharat Bhagya Bidhata" in the Tatwabodhini Patrika, which was the official publication of the Brahmo Samaj and of which Tagore was the Editor.

Outside of Calcutta, the song was first sung by the Rabindranath Tagore himself at a session in Besant Theosophical College in Madanapalle, Andhra Pradesh on 28 February 1919. The song enthralled the college authorities and they adopted the English version of the song as their prayer song which is still sang today. Tagore made the first English translation of the song at Madanapalle.

On the occasion of India attaining freedom, the Indian Constituent Assembly assembled for the first time as a sovereign body on 14 August 1947, midnight and the session closed with a unanimous performance of "Jana Gana Mana".

The members of the Indian Delegation to the General Assembly of the United Nations held in New York City in 1947 gave a recording of "Jana Gana Mana" as the country's national anthem. The song was played by the house orchestra in front of a gathering consisting of representatives from all over the world.

"Jana Gana Mana" was officially proclaimed as India's National Anthem by the Constituent Assembly of India on 24 January 1950.

== Lyrics ==
The English translation below has been adapted from an unverifiable source. Some changes have been made to both the translation and romanization.

| Bengali original | Romanisation of Bengali (ISO 15919) | IPA transcription | English translation |
|---|---|---|---|
| জনগণমন-অধিনায়ক জয় হে ভারতভাগ্যবিধাতা! পঞ্জাব সিন্ধু গুজরাট মরাঠা দ্রাবিড় উৎকল বঙ্গ বিন্ধ্য হিমাচল যমুনা গঙ্গা উচ্ছলজলধিতরঙ্গ তব শুভ নামে জাগে, তব শুভ আশিষ মাগে, গাহে তব জয়গাথা। জনগণমঙ্গলদায়ক জয় হে ভারতভাগ্যবিধাতা! জয় হে, জয় হে, জয় হে, জয় জয় জয় জয় হে॥ | Janaganamana-adhināẏaka jaẏa hē Bhāratabhāgyabidhātā (Note: Sanskrit transliteration "Bhāratabhāgyavidhātā")! Pañjāba Sindhu Gujarāṭa Marāṭhā Drābiṛa (Note: Sanskrit transliteration "Drāviṛa") Utkala Baṅga (Note: Sanskrit transliteration "Vaṅga"); Bindhya (Note: Sanskrit transliteration "Vindhya") Himācala Yamunā Gaṅgā ucchalajaladhitaraṅga Taba (Note: Sanskrit transliteration "tava") Śubha nāmē jāgē, taba śubha āśiṣa māgē, gāhē taba jaẏagāthā / Janaganamaṅgaladāẏaka jaẏa hē Bhāratabhāgyabidhātā! Jaẏa hē, Jaẏa hē, Jaẏa hē, jaẏa jaẏa jaẏa jaẏa hē. | [ˈdʒɔ.noˑ ˈɡɔ.noˑ ˈmɔ.noˑ ˈo.d̪ʱiˌnae̯.ɔ.koˑ ˈdʒɔe̯.oˑ ɦeˑ |] [ˈbʱa.ɾo.t̪oˑ ˈbʱa.ɡːoˑ ˈbi.d̪ʱa.t̪aˑ ǁ] [ˈpɔn.dʒa.boˑ ˈʃin̪.d̪ʱuˑ ˈɡu.dʒoˌɾa.ʈoˑ ˈmo.ɾa.ʈʰaˑ |] [ˈd̪ɾa.bi.ɽoˑ ˈut̪.kɔ.loˑ ˈbɔŋ.ɡoˑ ‖] [ˈbin̪.d̪ʱoˑ ˈɦi.maˌtʃɔ.loˑ ˈdʒo.mu.naˑ ˈɡɔŋ.ɡaˑ |] [ˈut̚.tʃʰɔ.loˑ ˈdʒɔ.lo.d̪ʱiˑ ˈt̪o.ɾɔŋ.ɡoˑ ‖] [ˈt̪ɔ.boˑ ˈʃu.bʱoˑ ˈna.meˑ ˈdʒa.ɡeˑ] [ˈt̪ɔ.boˑ ˈʃu.bʱoˑ ˈa.ʃi.ʃoˑ ˈma.ɡeˑ] [ˈga.ɦeˑ ˈt̪ɔ.boˑ ˈdʒɔe̯.oˑ ˈɡa.t̪ʰaˑ ‖] [ˈdʒɔ.noˑ ˈɡɔ.noˑ ˈmoŋ.ɡɔ.loˑ ˈd̪ae̯.ɔ.koˑ dʒɔe̯.oˑ ɦeˑ |] [ˈbʱa.ɾo.t̪oˑ ˈbʱa.ɡːoˑ ˈbi.d̪ʱa.t̪aˑ ‖] [ˈdʒɔe̯.oˑ ɦeˑ | ˈdʒɔe̯.oˑ ɦeˑ | ˈdʒɔe̯.oˑ ɦeˑ |] [ˈdʒɔe̯.oˑ ˈdʒɔe̯.oˑ ˈdʒɔe̯.oˑ ˈdʒɔe̯.oˑ ɦeˑ ‖] | Oh! the ruler of the minds of people, victory be to You, dispenser of the destiny of India! Punjab, Sindh, Gujarat, Maratha (Marathi heartland), Dravida (South India), Orissa and Bengal, The Vindhyas, the Himalayas, the Jumna (Yamuna) and the Ganges, and the oceans with foaming waves all around. Wake up listening to Your auspicious name, ask for Your auspicious blessings, And sing to Your glorious victory. Oh! You who impart well being to the people, victory be to You, dispenser of the destiny of India! Victory, victory, victory to You! |
| অহরহ তব আহ্বান প্রচারিত, শুনি তব উদার বাণী হিন্দু বৌদ্ধ শিখ জৈন পারসিক মুসলমান খৃস্টানী পূরব পশ্চিম আসে তব সিংহাসন-পাশে প্রেমহার হয় গাঁথা। জনগণ-ঐক্য-বিধায়ক জয় হে ভারতভাগ্যবিধাতা! জয় হে, জয় হে, জয় হে, জয় জয় জয় জয় হে॥ | Aharaha taba āhbāna (Note: Sanskrit transliteration "āhvāna") pracārita, śuni taba udāra bānī (Note: Sanskrit transliteration "vani"); Hindu Baudhha (Note: Sanskrit transliteration "Baudha") Śikha Jaina Pārasika Musalamāna Khṛsṭānī; Pūraba (Note: Sanskrit transliteration "Pūrava") Paścima āsē taba siṁhāsana-pāśē Prēmahāra haẏa gām̐thā / Janagana-aikya-bidhāẏaka (Note: Sanskrit transliteration "Janagana-aikya-vidhāẏaka") jaẏa hē Bhāratabhāgyabidhatā! Jaẏa hē, Jaẏa hē, Jaẏa hē, jaẏa jaẏa jaẏa jaẏa hē. | [ˈɔ.ɦoˌɾɔ.ɦoˑ ˈt̪ɔ.boˑ ˈa.ɦoˌba.noˑ ˈpɾo.tʃaˌɾi.t̪oˑ |] [ˈʃu.niˑ ˈt̪ɔ.boˑ ˈu.d̪a.ɾoˑ ˈba.niˑ |] [ˈɦin̪.d̪uˑ ˈbou̯.d̪ʱːoˑ ˈʃi.kʰoˑ ˈdʒoi̯.noˑ] [ˈpa.ɾo.ʃi.koˑ ˈmu.solˌma.noˑ ˈkʰɾiʂ.ʈa.niˑ] [ˈpu.ɾɔ.boˑ ˈpoʃ.tʃi.moˑ ˈa.ʃeˑ |] [ˈt̪ɔ.boˑ ˈʃiŋ.ɦaˌʃɔ.noˑ ˈpa.ʃeˑ |] [ˈpɾe.moˌɦa.ɾoˑ ˈɦoe̯.oˑ ˈɡã.t̪ʰaˑ ‖] [ˈdʒɔ.noˑ ˈɡɔ.noˑ ˈoi̯.kːoˌbi.dʱaˌjɔ.koˑ ˈdʒɔe̯.oˑ ɦeˑ] [ˈbʱa.ɾo.t̪oˑ ˈbʱa.ɡːoˑ ˈbi.d̪ʱa.t̪aˑ ‖] [ˈdʒɔe̯.oˑ ɦeˑ | ˈdʒɔe̯.oˑ ɦeˑ | ˈdʒɔe̯.oˑ ɦeˑ |] [ˈdʒɔe̯.oˑ ˈdʒɔe̯.oˑ ˈdʒɔe̯.oˑ ˈdʒɔe̯.oˑ ɦeˑ ‖] | Your call is announced continuously, we heed Your gracious call The Hindus, Buddhists, Sikhs, Jains, Parsis, Muslims and Christians, The East and the West come together, to the side of Your throne And weave the garland of love. Oh! You who bring in the unity of the people! Victory be to You, dispenser of the destiny of India! Victory, victory, victory to You! |
| পতন-অভ্যুদয়-বন্ধুর পন্থা, যুগ যুগ ধাবিত যাত্রী। হে চিরসারথি, তব রথচক্রে মুখরিত পথ দিনরাত্রি। দারুণ বিপ্লব-মাঝে তব শঙ্খধ্বনি বাজে সঙ্কটদুঃখত্রাতা। জনগণপথপরিচায়ক জয় হে ভারতভাগ্যবিধাতা! জয় হে, জয় হে, জয় হে, জয় জয় জয় জয় হে॥ | Patana-abhuyadaẏa-bandhura panthā, yuga yuga dhābita (Note: Sanskrit transliteration "dhāvita") yātrī / Hē cirasārathi, taba rathacakrē mukharita patha dinarātri / Dāruna biplaba-mājhē (Note: Sanskrit transliteration "viplava-mājhē") taba śaṅkhadhbani (Note: Sanskrit transliteration "śaṅkhadhvani") bājē (Note: Sanskrit transliteration "vājē"); Saṅkaṭaduḥkhatrātā. Janaganapathaparicāẏaka jaẏa hē Bhāratabhāgyabidhātā! Jaẏa hē, Jaẏa hē, Jaẏa hē, jaẏa jaẏa jaẏa jaẏa hē. | [ˈpɔ.t̪o.noˑ ˈo.bʱːuˌd̪ʱɔ.joˑ ˈbon̪.d̪ʱu.ɾoˑ ˈpɔn̪.t̪ʰaˑ |] [ˈdʒu.goˑ ˈdʒu.goˑ ˈd̪ʱa.bi.t̪oˑ ˈdʒa.t̪ɾiˑ ‖] [ɦeˑ ˈtʃi.ɾoˌʃa.ɾo.t̪ʰiˑ | ˈt̪ɔ.boˑ ˈɾɔ.t̪ʰoˌtʃo.kɾeˑ] [ˈmu.kʰoˌɾi.t̪ʰoˑ ˈpɔ.t̪ʰoˑ ˈd̪i.noˌɾa.t̪ɾiˑ ‖] [ˈd̪a.ɾu.noˑ ˈbi.plɔ.boˑ ˈma.dʒʱeˑ |] [ˈt̪ɔ.boˑ ˈʃɔŋ.kʰoˌd̪ʱo.niˑ ˈba.dʒʱeˑ] [ˈʃɔŋ.ko.ʈo ˈd̪uɦ.kʰoˑ ˈt̪ɾa.t̪a ‖] [ˈdʒɔ.noˑ ˈɡɔ.noˑ ˈpɔ.t̪ʰoˌpo.ɾiˌtʃae̯.ɔ.koˑ ˈdʒɔe̯.oˑ ɦeˑ] [ˈbʱa.ɾo.t̪oˑ ˈbʱa.ɡːoˑ ˈbi.d̪ʱa.t̪aˑ ‖] [ˈdʒɔe̯.oˑ ɦeˑ | ˈdʒɔe̯.oˑ ɦeˑ | ˈdʒɔe̯.oˑ ɦeˑ |] [ˈdʒɔe̯.oˑ ˈdʒɔe̯.oˑ ˈdʒɔe̯.oˑ ˈdʒɔe̯.oˑ ɦeˑ ‖] | The way of life is somber as it moves through ups and downs, but we, the pilgrims, have followed it through ages. Oh! Eternal Charioteer, the wheels of your chariot echo day and night in the path In the midst of fierce revolution, your conch shell sounds. You save us from fear and misery. Oh! You who guide the people through torturous path, victory be to You, dispenser of the destiny of India! Victory, victory, victory to You! |
| ঘোরতিমিরঘন নিবিড় নিশীথে পীড়িত মূর্ছিত দেশে জাগ্রত ছিল তব অবিচল মঙ্গল নতনয়নে অনিমেষে। দুঃস্বপ্নে আতঙ্কে রক্ষা করিলে অঙ্কে স্নেহময়ী তুমি মাতা। জনগণদুঃখত্রায়ক জয় হে ভারতভাগ্যবিধাতা! জয় হে, জয় হে, জয় হে, জয় জয় জয় জয় হে॥ | Ghōratimiraghana nibiṛa (Note: Sanskrit transliteration "niviṛa") niśīthē pīṛita mūrchita dēśē Jāgrata chila taba abicala (Note: Sanskrit transliteration "avicala") maṅgala natanaẏanē animeṣē / Duḥsbapnē (Note: Sanskrit transliteration "duḥsvapnē") ātaṅkē rakṣā karilē aṅkē Snēhamaẏī tumi mātā / Janaganaduḥkhatrāẏaka jaẏa hē Bhāratabhāgyabidhātā! Jaẏa hē, Jaẏa hē, Jaẏa hē, jaẏa jaẏa jaẏa jaẏa hē. | [ˈɡʱɔ.ɾoˑ ˈt̪i.mi.ɾoˑ ˈɡʱɔ.noˑ ˈni.bi.ɾoˑ ˈni.ʃi.t̪ʰeˑ] [ˈpi.ɾi.t̪oˑ ˈmuɾ.tʃʰi.t̪oˑ ˈd̪e.ʃeˑ |] [ˈdʒa.ɡɾo.t̪oˑ ˈtʃʰi.loˑ ˈt̪ɔ.boˑ ˈo.biˌtʃɔ.loˑ] [ˈmɔŋ.ɡɔ.loˑ ˈnɔ.t̪oˌnɔe̯.o.neˑ ˈɔ.niˌme.ʃeˑ ‖] [ˈd̪uɦ.ʃoˌpo.neˑ ˈa.t̪ɔŋ.keˑ] [ˈɾo.kːʰoˑ ˈko.ɾi.le ˈɔŋ.keˑ] [ˈsne.ɦoˌmoe̯.iˑ ˈt̪u.miˑ ˈma.t̪aˑ ‖] [ˈdʒɔ.noˑ ˈɡɔ.noˑ ˈd̪uɦ.kʰoˌt̪ɾae̯.ɔ.koˑ ˈdʒɔe̯.oˑ ɦeˑ] [ˈbʱa.ɾɔ.t̪oˑ ˈbʱa.ɡːoˑ ˈbi.d̪ʱa.t̪aˑ ‖] [ˈdʒɔe̯.oˑ ɦeˑ | ˈdʒɔe̯.oˑ ɦeˑ | ˈdʒɔe̯.oˑ ɦeˑ |] [ˈdʒɔe̯.oˑ ˈdʒɔe̯.oˑ ˈdʒɔe̯.oˑ ˈdʒɔe̯.oˑ ɦeˑ ‖] | During the bleakest of nights, when the whole country was sick and in swoon Wakeful remained Your incessant blessings, through Your lowered but wink-less eyes Through nightmares and fears, you protected us on Your lap, Oh Loving Mother; Oh! You who have removed the misery of the people, victory be to You, dispenser of the destiny of India! Victory, victory, victory to You! |
| রাত্রি প্রভাতিল, উদিল রবিচ্ছবি পূর্ব-উদয়গিরিভালে গাহে বিহঙ্গম, পুণ্য সমীরণ নবজীবনরস ঢালে। তব করুণারুণরাগে নিদ্রিত ভারত জাগে তব চরণে নত মাথা। জয় জয় জয় হে জয় রাজেশ্বর ভারতভাগ্যবিধাতা! জয় হে, জয় হে, জয় হে, জয় জয় জয় জয় হে॥ | Rātri prabhātila, udila rabicchabi (Note: Sanskrit transliteration "ravicchavi") pūrba-udaẏagiribhālē (Note: Sanskrit transliteration "pūrva-udaẏagiribhālē") - Gāhē bigaṅgama, (Note: Sanskrit transliteration "vigaṅgama") punya samīrana nabajībanarasa (Note: Sanskrit transliteration "navajīvanarasa") ḍhālē / Taba karunārurarāgē nidrita Bhārata jāgē taba caranē nata māthā / Jaẏa Jaẏa Jaẏa hē jaẏa rājēśbara (Note: Sanskrit transliteration "rājēśvara") Bhāratabhāgyabidhātā! Jaẏa hē, Jaẏa hē, Jaẏa hē, jaẏa jaẏa jaẏa jaẏa hē. | [ˈɾa.t̪ɾiˑ ˈpɾo.bʱaˌt̪i.loˑ | ˈu.d̪i.loˑ ˈɾo.biˌtʃːʰo.biˑ] [ˈpuɾ.boˑ ˈu.d̪ɔe̯.oˑ ˈɡi.ɾiˑ ˈbʱa.leˑ] [ˈɡa.ɦeˑ ˈbi.ɦɔŋˌɡɔ.moˑ ˈpu.nːoˑ ˈʃo.miˌɾɔ.noˑ] [ˈnɔ.boˑ ˈdʒi.bɔˌno.ɾɔ.ʃo ˈd̪ʱa.leˑ ‖] [ˈt̪ɔ.boˑ ˈko.ɾuˌna.ɾu.noˑ ˈɾa.ɡeˑ] [ˈni.d̪ɾi.t̪oˑ ˈbʱa.ɾɔ.t̪oˑ ˈdʒa.ɡeˑ] [ˈt̪ɔ.boˑ ˈtʃɔ.ɾo.neˑ ˈnɔ.t̪oˑ ˈma.t̪ʰaˑ ‖] [ˈdʒɔe̯.oˑ ˈdʒɔe̯.oˑ ˈdʒɔe̯.oˑ ɦeˑ ˈdʒɔe̯.oˑ ˈɾa.dʒeʃˌbɔ.ɾoˑ] [ˈbʱa.ɾɔ.t̪oˑ ˈbʱa.ɡːoˑ ˈbi.d̪ʱa.t̪aˑ ‖] [ˈdʒɔe̯.oˑ ɦeˑ | ˈdʒɔe̯.oˑ ɦeˑ | ˈdʒɔe̯.oˑ ɦeˑ |] [ˈdʒɔe̯.oˑ ˈdʒɔe̯.oˑ ˈdʒɔe̯.oˑ ˈdʒɔe̯.oˑ ɦeˑ ‖] | The night is over, and the Sun has risen over the hills of the eastern horizon. The birds are singing, and a gentle auspicious breeze is pouring the elixir of new life. By the halo of Your compassion, India that was asleep is now waking On your feet we now lay our heads Oh! Victory, victory, victory to you, the Supreme King, victory be to You, dispenser of the destiny of India! Victory, victory, victory to You! |

Apart from the above translation which follows the original very closely, Tagore's own interpretation of Jana Gana Mana in English is available as The Morning Song of India – via Wikisource..

== See also ==
- Jana Gana Mana (The National Anthem of India)
- Rabindranath Tagore
- Vande Mataram-The National Song of India
- Bankim Chandra Chattopadhyay
- Jana Gana Mana Video
- An earlier poem by Tagore (Amar Shonar Bangla) was later selected as the national anthem of Bangladesh.
- Chitto Jetha Bhayshunyo ("Where the Mind is Without Fear...Into that heaven of freedom, Let my country awake!") -a patriotic poem from Gitanjali by Rabindranath Tagore
- Ekla Chalo Re- A poem by Rabindranath Tagore and publicised by Subhas Chandra Bose
- Indian National Pledge by Pydimarri Venkata Subba Rao
