= Marhatta (region) =

Historical region in India

Marhatta also known as Maharatta, or Marhat Des (which means Marhat country) was a historical region 116 km (72 miles, 18 Parganas) south of the Narmada River and north of the Karnãtak (Karnataka) in which the Marathi language was spoken. The region is invoked, along with Punjab, Sindh, Gujarat, Utkala, Bengal and Dravida as the different cultural regions of India in Rabindranath Tagore's poem which was chosen as the national anthem "Jana Gana Mana" of the newly-established Indian republic in 1950.

== Etymology ==
Multiple theories have been proposed but the exact etymology of the name is uncertain.

=== Maharatta/Maharatha ===
A theory is that the term is derived from Maha ("great") and ratha / rathi (chariot / charioteer), which refers to a skilful northern fighting force that migrated southward into the area.

According to Shamba Joshi, the word Mar-Hatta comes from the word Hatta-Desa, the settlement of Hatti-Karas (Hatkars). In Old Kannada, the meaning of Hatti-Kara is milkman (Gavli) and Hatti means cattle pen or fold. Patti in Tamil would mean cowstall, sheepfold, a measure of land sufficient for sheepfold, cattle pound, a hamlet, a village, a place. He observes that Hatti-Karas are descendents of Patti-Janas, people who were settled in the south of Narmada River during the middle ages. This region was called Hatta-Desa. After the 12th century AD, the civil strife between the Yadavas of Devagiri and Halebidu (Hoysala's capital) split this land into two, into Marhätta and Karnätaka. Saint Ramdas refers to the two parts, Hatak for Marhätta and Karnatak for Karnätaka, in one of his Aratis.

According to R. G. Bhandarkar, the origin of the name lies in a tribe mentioned by Mauryan Emperor Ashoka in a copy of his rock-cut edicts (B. C. 245) preserved at Girnar where he is mentioned as sending ministers to the rattas (or rashtrikas "nations"), the suggestion being that a couple of the rattas took the name of Maharatta "great rattas". This is supported by the practice of the Bhoja rulers of the Konkan and West Deccan, who are styled "Bhojas" in Ashoka's thirteenth edict (B. C. 240) and "Mahabhoja" in rock-cut inscriptions in the Bedsa caves in Pune.

"That it is a compound of Maha - great, and rashtrika - either a sanskrit term of Rātta or a term applied generally to chiefs ruling in the Deccan."

"That it is a compound of Maha, great, and Ratha, a rider or charioteer or warrior, corresponding to the ancient Persian caste of Rathaishtar or chariot rider."

== History ==
The Nashik Gazetteer states that in 246 BC "Maharatta" is noticed, as per the Mahavanso, as one of the ten places to which Ashoka sent an embassy, and the word "Marhatta" (later used for the Marathas) is found in the Jain Maharashtri literature.

In his book on the history of the Deccan, Persian historian Firishta (1560-1600) mentions, in his account of the conquest of the region under Alauddin Khilji, the province of Maharat (or Mherat) with its people "dependent on Daulatabad apparently considered to centre in Paithan or, as it is written, Mheropatan" as does the tenth century Arab geographer Al-Biruni, as Marhat country beginning seventy-two miles south of the Narmada with Thane as its capital. In 1342, the Moroccan traveller Ibn Battuta referred to all the native inhabitants of Deogiri region as belonging collectively to the "tribe of Marhata", whose elite included both Brahmins and Warriors

== See also ==
- Maratha
- Deccan
