= Joe Bruce =

Joe Bruce may refer to:

- Violent J (Joseph Bruce, born 1972), American rapper and record producer
- Joe Bruce (footballer) (1905–1988), Australian rules footballer
