= Shunji Watanabe =

Japanese karateka

- Born: 1938 (age 87–88); Japan
- Style: Shorinjiryu Kenkokan Karate, Shorinjiryu Kenyukai Watanabe Ha Karate
- Teacher: Kōri Hisataka

Shunji Watanabe (born 1938) is the founder of Shorinjiryu Kenyukai Watanabe Ha Karate.

Watanabe was born in Japan in 1938, and commenced training in Shorinjiryu Kenkokan Karate in 1955 under the tutelage of that systems founder, Kōri Hisataka.

In 1967, he was selected by his teacher to move to North America to help spread Shorinjiryu Kenkokan Karatedo. After demonstrating at World Expo 67 in Montreal, Quebec, Canada (along with Masayuki Hisataka, the founder's son), he settled in Baltimore, Maryland, U.S.A. and opened the Japan Karate Center. As of 2012, Shunji Watanabe continues to teach the art as taught to him.

In the mid-1970s, the Shorinjiryu Kenkokan Karate organization in North America splintered. Shunji Watanabe, along with Minoru Morita in the U.S.A. and Shigeru Ishino in Canada, founded the Shorinjiryu Kenyukai Karate Federation. Morita has subsequently retired, and Ishino has founded a separate karate organization, Ishino Shorinjiryu Genbukan Karate. Watanabe now teaches his interpretation of Shorinjiryu Kenkokan - Shorinjiryu Kenyukai Watanabe Ha Karate. As of 2012, there are branch dojo on Long Island, NY, USA, and Brisbane, Australia.

The Australian Shorinjiryu Karatedo group, previously students of Masayuki Hisataka from 1977 to 1995, became students of Shunji Watanabe between 2007 and 2011. This group is one of the few to have extensive learning from two of Kori Hisataka's leading students. Upon becoming independent from Watanabe Sensei in 2011, the Australian Shorinjiryu Karatedo group formed the Shorinjiryu Koshinkai Karatedo school. One dojo, the Seishinjuku Dojo in Brisbane under the leadership of Jason Romer, remained part of Watanabe Sensei's federation.
