= Momo and Uzeir =

Yugoslav comedy duo

- Cover of one of their comedy albums.
- Years active: until 1988

Momo and Uzeir was a Yugoslav comedy duo made up of Bosniak Rejhan Demirdžić (2 January 1927 – 22 August 1988) and Serbian-born Rudolf "Rudi" Alvađ (17 July 1929 – 21 September 1988). The characters of Momo and Uzeir were created by Nikola Škrba (1922–1995). Their radio comedy show Cik Cak aired on Radio Sarajevo and was popular all over Yugoslavia.

== Rejhan Demirdžić ==
Demirdžić first began acting in 1943, aged 16, in the play The Mistress of the Inn at the Sarajevo National Theatre. From 1945 to 1955 he was a member of theater ensembles in Šabac, Niš and Užice, before returning to the Sarajevo National Theatre. In 1969 Demirdžić starred in Karađoz (Black-eyed), a sketch comedy television show that he co-wrote with Jurislav Korenić (1915–1974). It aired on Televizija Sarajevo until 1971.

== Rudi Alvađ ==
Alvađ was born in Petrovac na Mlavi, then a part of the Morava Banovina of the Kingdom of Yugoslavia. He was a theatre actor that worked in Pula and Varaždin before moving to Sarajevo.

== Legacy ==
The twin skyscrapers of the Sarajevo United Investment and Trading Company, built in 1986, were unofficially named after the duo.
