= Leonard Kuypers =

Dutch fencer (1899–1988)

Personal information
- Born: 13 June 1899 Bukittinggi, West Sumatra, Dutch East Indies
- Died: 4 August 1988 (aged 89) Cape Coral, Florida, United States

Sport
- Sport: Fencing

Leonard Kuypers (13 June 1899 – 4 August 1988) was a Dutch fencer. He competed in the team épée event at the 1928 Summer Olympics.
