= Smokey Haangala =

- Birth name: Edwin Haakulipa Haangala
- Born: January 16, 1950; Southern Province, Zambia
- Died: August 16, 1988 (aged 38); Lusaka, Zambia
- Occupation(s): Editor, Singer
- Years active: 1950s–1980s
- Spouse: Lungowe Marilyn Siyambango

Smokey Haangala (16 January 1950 – 16 August 1988), born Edwin Haakulipa Haangala, was a Zambian poet, writer, composer, musician and news editor. He rose to the top of the Zambian music scene in the 1970s and 1980s and was most famous for his keyboard playing. His most popular songs include Baala Ng'ombe, Kavundula, Mandalena Kasama, Bo Lisabet Wa Matambula and Mandalena Mongu. His music has been classified as Zamrock. His father, Cosmas Kaluwe Haangala, worked as a teacher, and his mother Agnes Nangoma Chona was a housewife who also taught domestic science. He died on 16th August 1988. He was survived by a wife, Lungowe Marilyn Siyambango and two children named Mate and Kaluwe

He won an award for best soloist in 1977 and 1978.

He also worked as a columnist or journalist with several periodicals, including the Times of Zambia, Weekend World, and Zambia Daily Mail before leaving to focus on his music.

== Discography ==
=== Studio albums ===
1. Aunka Ma Kwacha
2. Waunka Mooye

=== Compiled albums ===
1. Zambian Legends

=== Selected singles ===
1. Sinzala
2. Mwambile
3. Sticking

== See also ==
- Music of Zambia
