= Peter Lowe (cricketer) =

English cricketer

Personal information
- Full name: Peter John Lowe
- Born: 7 January 1935; Sutton Coldfield, Warwickshire, England
- Died: 4 August 1988 (aged 53); Avon Gorge, Bristol, England
- Batting: Right-handed
- Role: Wicket-keeper

Domestic team information
- Years: Team
- 1964: Warwickshire

Career statistics
Competition	First-class
Matches	1
Runs scored	–
Batting average	–
100s/50s	–/–
Top score	–
Balls bowled	–
Wickets	–
Bowling average	–
5 wickets in innings	–
10 wickets in match	–
Best bowling	–
Catches/stumpings	2/–
- Source: Cricinfo, 22 December 2011

Peter John Lowe (7 January 1935 – 4 August 1988) was an English cricketer. Lowe was a right-handed batsman who fielded as a wicket-keeper. He was born at Sutton Coldfield, Warwickshire.

Lowe made a single first-class appearance for Warwickshire against Oxford University at Edgbaston in 1964. He was not required to bat in this match, while behind the stumps he took 2 catches. These was his only major appearance for Warwickshire.

He died at Avon Gorge, Bristol on 4 August 1988.
