= Henry Joseph Gallagher =

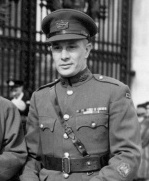
- Born: 31 December 1914; Stoke-on-Trent, Staffordshire
- Died: 25 August 1988 (aged 73); Kelmscott, Western Australia
- Military career
- Allegiance: United Kingdom
- Branch: British Army
- Service years: 1932–1955
- Rank: Company Sergeant Major
- Nickname: Harry
- Unit: Gloucestershire Regiment
- Conflicts: World War II; Korean War
- Awards: Distinguished Conduct Medal

Henry Joseph Gallagher (31 December 1914 – 25 August 1988) was awarded the DCM for his gallantry during the epic defence of Castle Hill on the Imjin River, during the Korean War.

== Early life ==
Born in Hanley, Stoke-on-Trent, Harry Gallagher, the third of nine children of Henry and Elizabeth Gallagher, was educated at Sacred Heart RC School. Finding himself unemployed in the depressed conditions of the city in the 1930s he joined the Gloucesters at the age of 18. During a career that spanned a quarter of a century he saw active duty in North Africa and then, at the start of the Second World War, as part of the British troops defending the Maginot Line in France. He was subsequently taken prisoner by the Germans whilst covering the retreat of the armed forces at Dunkirk. He was held captive at the Stalag 20A camp in Thorn Podgorz (Toruń), Poland, and, despite two escape attempts, was held prisoner for four years.

== Details ==
Harry Gallagher was with the Gloucesters in A Company in the Korean action and is mentioned by Battalion Headquarters Adjutant, Sir General Anthony Farrar-Hockley in his book The Edge of Sword, which covers the Battle of the Imjin River, Korea and the subsequent hardship in the prisoner-of-war camps. For his part in the action that took place on the night 22/23 April 1951 he was awarded the DCM, and the citation by Battalion Headquarters Commanding Officer, Lt. Col. J.P. Carne, VC, DSO reads:

5182071 CSM WO2 Harry Gallagher, A Company, 1 Glosters

On the night 22/23 Apr 51, A Company, 1 GLOSTERS were the left forward company of that Battalion and were in occupation of a feature commanding a main crossing of the IMJIN river, known generally as CASTLE HILL.
During the early part of the night, strong CHINESE Forces crossed the river at this and other crossings and attacked A Company with great ferocity: a major engagement developed and, as the night wore on, heavy CHINESE reinforcements were committed against A Company, and the Company on its immediate right flank, D Company.

The fanatical, heavy assaults did not decrease with daylight on 23 Apr; indeed, such was the anxiety of the enemy to capture their objective before full light – and the consequent danger of air attack – that they redoubled their efforts just before dawn. Eventually, by sheer weight of numbers, they captured the highest point of A Company’s position. Already, one platoon officer had been killed and, in an effort to regain the lost ground, yet a second platoon commander met his death. Serjeant-Major GALLAGHER now went forward to restore a dangerous situation developing as the result of this and, by stabilising the position of one of the now decimated forward platoons, temporarily halted the CHINESE advance. This task was accomplished only through complete disregard for his personal safety from the heavy machine-gun and mortar fire that swept the entire area in which he directed the establishment of fresh positions. That he was not killed was a miracle, especially considering that much of the time he moved across open ground, only taking cover when all others had obtained sheltered fire positions from which to reply.

Having thus restored temporarily the forward defences, he now returned to his Company HQ where the Company Commander had been occupied in preparation of a counterattack. This area was also under intense fire and, as Serjeant-Major GALLAGHER reached it, his Company Commander was killed.

In this moment, but for Serjeant-Major GALLAGHER’s coolness, skill, and bravery, the entire position might well have been lost. However, owing to his action, the forward elements of the Company continued to withstand the enemy’s assaults and to hold their ground until, at length, the third platoon commander of the company was able to reach Company HQ and take command.

Twice in that morning, Serjeant-Major GALLAGHER displayed the highest qualities of leadership and gallantry to such an extent that his personal actions averted disaster. His endeavours at this time demand only the highest praise.

After the Glosters' position had been over-run, the survivors had to endure a fortnight of night marches under the oppression of the Chinese Army. Harry Gallagher was held captive for two years in the appalling conditions of PoW Camp No 2 on the Yalu River, before he was released in 1953.

== Later life ==
Harry Gallagher retired from the army as WO1 in 1955, and later emigrated on medical advice to Australia with his wife Winnifred and his sons Tony and Christopher. He died in 1988 and was buried with military honours at Perth, Western Australia.
