= Richard Hamblin =

Richard Kaye Hamblin
- Born: Richard Kaye Hamblin; 16 December 1906; Fyzabad, India
- Died: 30 August 1988 (aged 81); Alton, Hampshire, England
- Military career
- Allegiance: United Kingdom
- Branch: Royal Air Force
- Service years: 1924–1956
- Rank: Air Commodore
- Service number: 16223
- Units: No. 17 Squadron RAF No. 56 Squadron RAF; No. 31 Squadron RAF; No. 5 Squadron RAF No. 142 Squadron RAF
- Commands: No. 17 Squadron RAF; No. 85 Squadron RAF; No. 142 Squadron RAF
- Conflicts: World War II
- Awards: Order of the British Empire (CBE)

Air Commodore Richard Kaye Hamblin CBE (16 December 1906 – 30 August 1988) was a Royal Air Force pilot and as one of The Few was part of No. 17 Squadron RAF flying the Hawker Hurricane during the Battle of Britain.

== History ==
Hamblin was born on 16 December 1906 at Fyzabad in India. By the time of the 1910 Census of Lymington in Hampshire he was a four-year-old living with his grandfather a retired Indian civil servant.

Hamblin joined the Royal Air Force in 1926 as a flight cadet. On 30 July 1926 he was posted to No. 56 Squadron RAF as a pilot. In 1930 he attended the Electrical and Wireless School to train as a signals officer. In October 1932 he was posted to No. 31 Squadron RAF in India eventually becoming a flight commander with No. 5 Squadron RAF and was promoted to Squadron Leader before leaving India.

In 1938 he was appointed commanding officer of No. 142 Squadron RAF operating the Fairey Battle, this was followed by a staff appointment in the Deputy Directorate of War Organisation. During the Battle of Britain he flew operations with No. 17 Squadron RAF.

In November 1941 he was appointed Officer Commanding No. 85 Squadron RAF operating the Douglas Havoc. On 12 November 1942 Hamblin married a Women's Auxiliary Air Force (WAAF) Elizabeth Bond at Durham Cathedral. Hamblin was mentioned in dispatched four times during the war and was appointed a Commander of the Order of the British Empire in 1946.

After the war he was back to staff duties including officer commanding AHQ West Africa, AOA at No. 2 Group and Director of Personnel from 1954 until he retired in 1956 as an Air Commodore.

Hamblin died on 30 August 1988 in Hampshire.

== See also ==
- List of RAF aircrew in the Battle of Britain
