= Ray Baxter (footballer, born 1904) =

Australian rules footballer, born 1904

Personal information
- Full name: Raymond George Reed Baxter
- Born: 9 March 1904; Frankston, Victoria
- Died: 29 August 1988 (aged 84); Bairnsdale, Victoria
- Original team: Somerville
- Height: 180 cm (5 ft 11 in)
- Weight: 80 kg (176 lb)

Playing career^{1}
Years	Club	Games (Goals)
1925	Richmond	2 (3)
- ^{1} Playing statistics correct to the end of 1925.

Raymond George Reed Baxter (9 March 1904 – 29 August 1988) was an Australian rules footballer who played with Richmond in the Victorian Football League (VFL).
