= Besant Theosophical College =

Undergraduate college in India

Coordinates: 13.55509°N 78.499051°E

- Motto: Education as Service
- Type: Private
- Established: 1917; 109 years ago
- Affiliations: Sri Venkateswara University
- Principal: Dr.Gayam Ananda Reddy
- Location: Madanapalle, Andhra Pradesh, India
- Campus: Rural
- Website: btcollege.org

Besant Theosophical College, established in 1917, it is one of the oldest colleges in the Rayalaseema region of Andhra Pradesh, India.

== History ==
Besant Theosophical College started on 19 July 1915 in Madanapalle and it was affiliated to Madras University. In 1917, when Dr. Annie Besant led the agitation for "Home Rule", this institution, which became a centre of nationalist activities, was obliged to dissociate itself from the Madras University and became part of the newly organized Visva-Bharati University founded by Rabindranath Tagore.

In 1919, Tagore visited the college and during this time translated the lyrics of the Indian national anthem, "Jana Gana Mana", which he had previously written, from Bengali to English. Margaret Cousins (an expert in European music and wife of Irish poet James Cousins, then vice-principal of the college) set down the western notation to the national anthem in the college based on the notes provided by Tagore himself. During Tagore's visit, the Scout Movement and "All India Women Association" were inaugurated at Madanapalle.

In 1923, the college was re-affiliated to Madras University and continued for almost 30 years. After the separation of Andhra State and Madras State, the college was affiliated to Andhra University (1954–1956) and then to Sri Venkateswara University, Tirupati.

== Noted alumni ==
Some of its prominent alumni includes, Kotla Vijaya Bhaskara Reddy, former Chief Minister of Andhra Pradesh and Union Cabinet Minister.
