= Walt Wollermann =

Australian rules footballer, born 1908

Personal information
- Full name: Walt Wollermann
- Born: 21 June 1908
- Died: 31 August 1988 (aged 80)
- Original team: Horsham
- Height: 189 cm (6 ft 2 in)
- Weight: 102 kg (225 lb)

Playing career^{1}
Years	Club	Games (Goals)
1933	Essendon	9 (2)
- ^{1} Playing statistics correct to the end of 1933.

Walt Wollermann (21 June 1908 – 31 August 1988) was an Australian rules footballer who played with Essendon in the Victorian Football League (VFL).
