= Jana Gana Mana =

National anthem of India

English: The Minds of All People
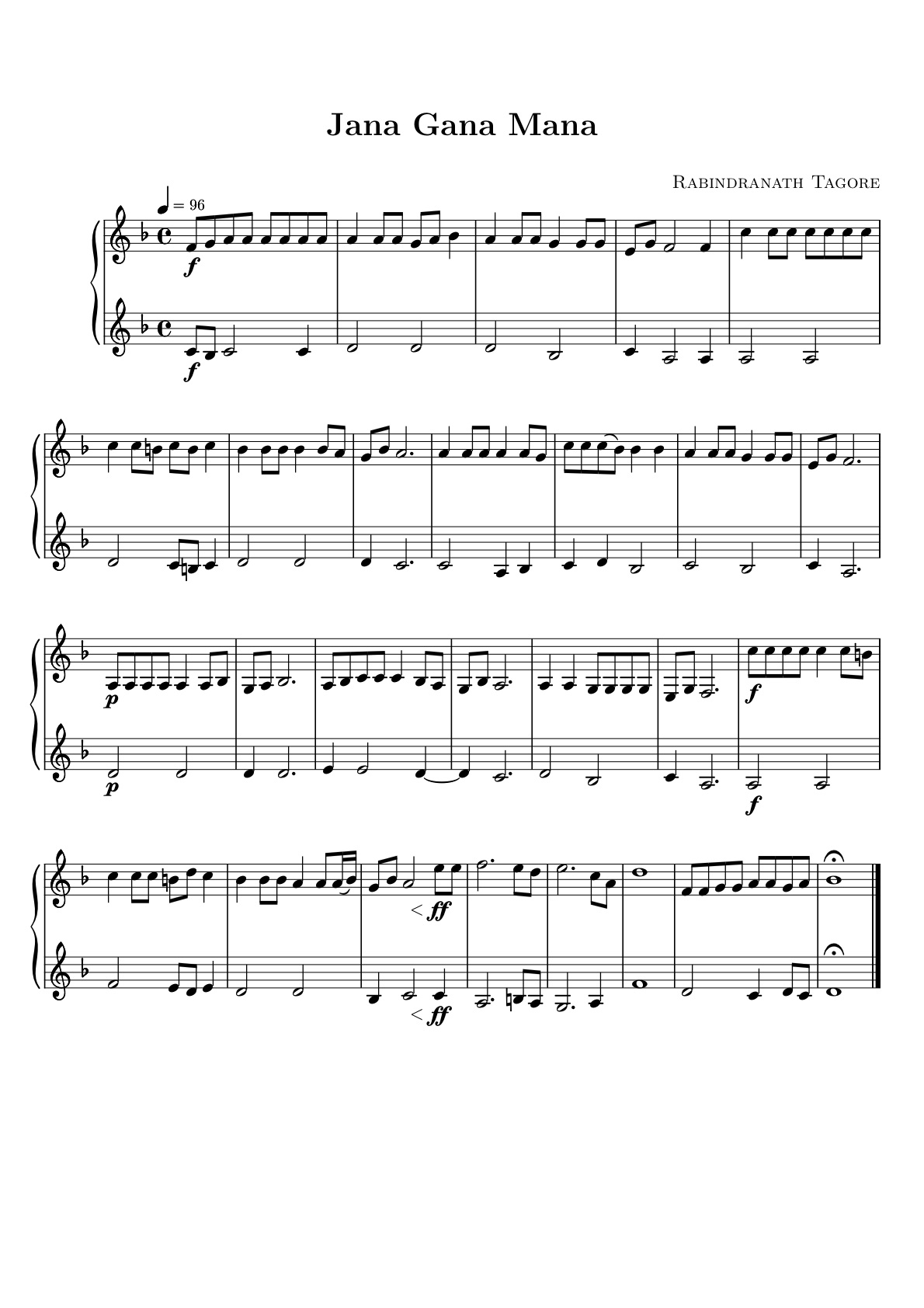
- Sheet music for "Jana Gana Mana"
- National anthem of India
- Lyrics: Rabindranath Tagore, 11 December 1911
- Music: Rabindranath Tagore, 11 December 1911
- Adopted: 24 January 1950; 76 years ago

Audio sample
- Instrumental version of Jana Gana Mana played by the US Navy (c. 1983): file; help

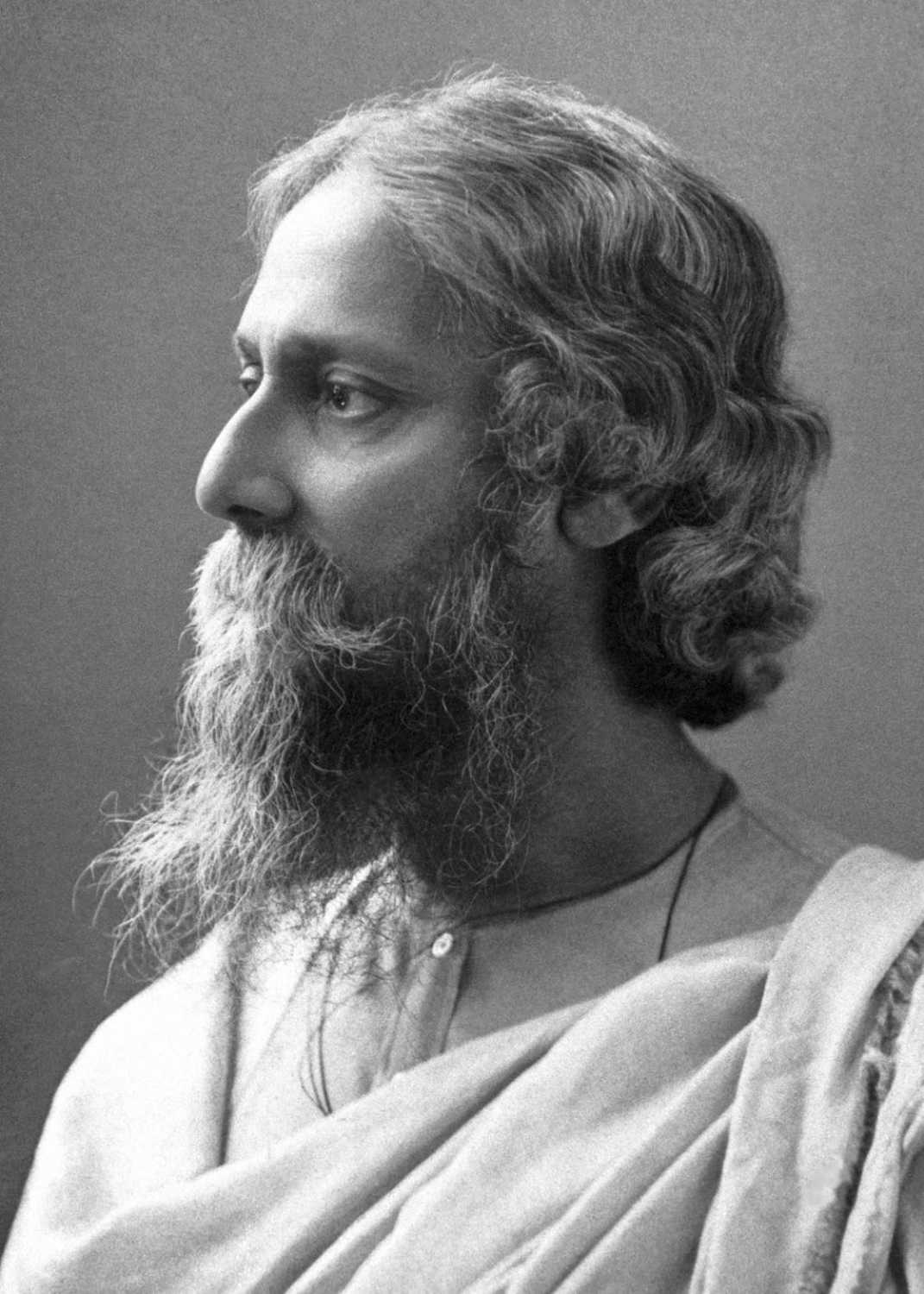
Rabindranath Tagore, the author and composer of the national anthems of India and Bangladesh

Rabindranath Tagore reciting "Jana Gana Mana"

"Jana Gana Mana" (Note: The song's title "Jana Gaṇa Mana" is pronounced [ˈd͡ʒɔno ˈɡɔno ˈmɔno] in Bengali, [d͡ʒən(ə) ɡəɳ(ə) mən(ə)] in Hindi, and [ˈd͡ʑɐnɐ ɡɐˈɳɐ ˈmɐnɐ] in Sanskrit. It can be literally translated as 'The Minds of All People' – from जन jana 'people', गण gaṇa 'group', and मन mana 'mind'.) is the national anthem of the Republic of India. It was originally composed as "Bharoto Bhagyo Bidhata" in Sādhu Bhāṣā, a 19th-century Sankritised register of the Bengali language, written by polymath, activist and country's first Nobel laureate Rabindranath Tagore on 11 December 1911. The first stanza of the song "Bharoto Bhagyo Bidhata", originally composed as a Hindu religious hymn for the Brahmo Samaj, was adopted by the Constituent Assembly of India as the National Anthem on 24 January 1950. A formal rendition of the national anthem takes approximately 52 seconds. A shortened version consisting of the first and last lines (and taking about 20 seconds to play) is also staged occasionally. It was first publicly sung on 27 December 1911 at the Calcutta (present-day Kolkata) Session of the Indian National Congress.

== History ==
The National Anthem of India is officially titled "Jana Gana Mana". The song was originally composed in Bengali by India's first Nobel laureate Rabindranath Tagore on 11 December 1911. The parent song, "Bharoto Bhagyo Bidhata", is a religious hymn originally composed for the monotheistic Brahma Samaj that has five verses of which only the first verse was adopted as the national anthem.

The lyrics of the song first appeared in 5 stanzas in Bengali magazine in an issue of Tatwabodhini Patrika. The melody of the song, in the Alhaiya Bilaval raga, was composed as a Brahmo hymn by Tagore himself with possibly some help from his musician grand-nephew Dinendranath Tagore. The final form of the song before the first public performance was set on 11 December 1911.

The song was first publicly sung on the second day of the annual session of the Indian National Congress in Kolkata on 27 December 1911 by Rabindranath Tagore's niece in her school assembly. Then, it was followed in January 1912 at the annual event of the Adi Brahmo Samaj, However, it was largely unknown except to the readers of the Adi Brahmo Samaj journal, Tattwabodhini Patrika. The poem was published in January 1912, under the title "Bharat Bhagya Bidhata" in the Tatwabodhini Patrika, which was the official publication of the Brahmo Samaj with Tagore then the Editor.

In 1917, the song was again performed at the Congress conference and this time in aid of instrumental music by the Mahraja Bahadur of Nattore.

Outside of Calcutta, the song was first sung by the bard himself at a session in Besant Theosophical College in Madanapalle, Madras (current Andhra Pradesh) on 28 February 1919 when Tagore visited the college and sang the song. The song enthralled the college students and Margaret Cousins, then vice-principal of the college (also an expert in European music and wife of Irish poet James Cousins). Based on the notes provided by Tagore himself, the song was preserved in 1919 in Western notation at Madanapalle by Margaret Cousins and her students. The whole episode was recorded by James Cousins in his autobiography "We Two Together":

In a voice surprisingly light for so large a man, he sang something like a piece of geography giving a list of countries, mountains and rivers; and in the second verse, a list of the religions in India. The refrain to the first made us pick up our ears. The refrain to the second verse made us clear our throats. We asked for it again and again, and before long we were singing it with gusto: Jaya hai, Jaya hai, Jaya hai, Jaya JayaJayaJaya hai (Victory, victory, victory to thee). We had no idea who or what was to have the victory. The next day Rabindranath gave the swarams(notes) of "Jana gana" to Mrs.Cousins so that the melody should have accurate permanent record. He also made the translation of the song into English as 'The Morning Song of India'.

Thus, Margaret Cousins became probably the first person to transcribe and preserve Tagore's composition in Western sheet music notation at Madanapalle based on the notes provided by Tagore himself. And soon it took its place in the "daily deciation" of the combined school and college of Besant Hall in Madanapalle and is still sung to this date. It was also here that the song was first translated into English by Tagore as "The Morning Song of India".

1942 orchestral instrumental recording (with narrated intro)
Performed by the Radio Hamburg Chamber Orchestra as the national anthem of India on 11 September 1942 in Hamburg, Germany

The song was selected as the national anthem by Subhas Chandra Bose while he was in Germany. On the occasion of the founding meeting of the German-Indian Society on 11 September 1942 in the Hotel Atlantic in Hamburg, "Jana Gana Mana" was played for the first time by the Hamburg Radio Symphony Orchestra as the national anthem of India. The musical notations for this interpretation of the song were prepared by B.L. Mukherjee and Ambik Majumdar.

Before it officially became the national anthem of India in 1950, "Jana Gana Mana" was heard in the 1945 film Hamrahi. It was also adopted as a school song of The Doon School, Dehradun in 1935.

On the occasion of India attaining freedom, the Indian Constituent Assembly assembled for the first time as a sovereign body at midnight on 14 August 1947; the session closed with a unanimous performance of "Jana Gana Mana".

The national anthem of India (Jana Gana Mana) played in an Indian school's assembly

The members of the Indian delegation to the General Assembly of the United Nations held in New York in 1947 gave a recording of "Jana Gana Mana" as the country's national anthem. The song was played by the house orchestra in front of a gathering consisting of representatives from all over the world.

== Code of conduct ==
The National Anthem of India is played or sung on various occasions. Instructions have been issued from time to time about the correct versions of the anthem, the occasions on which these are to be played or sung and the need for paying respect to the anthem by observance of proper decorum on such occasions. The substance of these instructions has been embodied in the information sheet issued by the government of India for general information and guidance. The approximate duration of the full version of the National Anthem of India is 52 seconds; the shorter version is approximately 20 seconds.

== Lyrics ==
Vocal recording

=== Original Bengali composition ===
The poem was composed in a literary register of the Bengali language called Sadhu Bhasha, which is heavily Sanskritised (i.e. mainly uses tatsama words).

Bengali script

জনগণমন-অধিনায়ক জয় হে ভারতভাগ্যবিধাতা!
পঞ্জাব সিন্ধু গুজরাট মরাঠা দ্রাবিড় উৎকল বঙ্গ
বিন্ধ্য হিমাচল যমুনা গঙ্গা উচ্ছলজলধিতরঙ্গ
তব শুভ নামে জাগে, তব শুভ আশিষ মাগে,
গাহে তব জয়গাথা।
জনগণমঙ্গলদায়ক জয় হে ভারতভাগ্যবিধাতা!
জয় হে, জয় হে, জয় হে, জয় জয় জয় জয় হে॥

ISO 15919 transliteration

Jana-gaṇa-mana-adhināẏaka jaẏa hē Bhārata-bhāgya-bidhātā!
Pañjāba Sindhu Gujarāṭa Marāṭhā Drābiṛa Uṯkala Baṅga
Bindhya Himācala Yamunā Gaṅgā Ucchala-jaladhi-taraṅga
Taba śubha nāmē jāgē,
Taba śubha āśiṣa māgē,
Gāhē taba jaẏa-gāthā.
Jana-gaṇa-maṅgala-dāẏaka jaẏa hē Bhārata-bhāgya-bidhātā!
Jaẏa hē, jaẏa hē, jaẏa hē, jaẏa jaẏa jaẏa jaẏa hē.

IPA transcription (Note: See Help:IPA/Bengali and Bengali phonology.) (Note: This is a sanskritised transcription, which means that the normally-elided inherent vowel অ /ɔ/ (अ /ɐ/ in Devanagari) is fully pronounced in all phonetic environments when sung.)

[ˈdʒɔ.noˑ ˈɡɔ.noˑ ˈmɔ.noˑ ˈo.d̪ʱiˌnae̯.ɔ.koˑ ˈdʒɔe̯.oˑ ɦeˑ |] [ˈbʱa.ɾo.t̪oˑ ˈbʱa.ɡːoˑ ˈbi.d̪ʱa.t̪aˑ ǁ]
[ˈpɔn.dʒa.boˑ ˈʃin̪.d̪ʱuˑ ˈɡu.dʒoˌɾa.ʈoˑ ˈmo.ɾa.ʈʰaˑ |] [ˈd̪ɾa.bi.ɽoˑ ˈut̪.kɔ.loˑ ˈbɔŋ.ɡoˑ ‖]
[ˈbin̪.d̪ʱoˑ ˈɦi.maˌtʃɔ.loˑ ˈdʒo.mu.naˑ ˈɡɔŋ.ɡaˑ |] [ˈut̚.tʃʰɔ.loˑ ˈdʒɔ.lo.d̪ʱiˑ ˈt̪o.ɾɔŋ.ɡoˑ ‖]
[ˈt̪ɔ.boˑ ˈʃu.bʱoˑ ˈna.meˑ ˈdʒa.ɡeˑ]
[ˈt̪ɔ.boˑ ˈʃu.bʱoˑ ˈa.ʃi.ʃoˑ ˈma.ɡeˑ]
[ˈga.ɦeˑ ˈt̪ɔ.boˑ ˈdʒɔe̯.oˑ ˈɡa.t̪ʰaˑ ‖]
[ˈdʒɔ.noˑ ˈɡɔ.noˑ ˈmoŋ.ɡɔ.loˑ ˈd̪ae̯.ɔ.koˑ dʒɔe̯.oˑ ɦeˑ |] [ˈbʱa.ɾo.t̪oˑ ˈbʱa.ɡːoˑ ˈbi.d̪ʱa.t̪aˑ ‖]
[ˈdʒɔe̯.oˑ ɦeˑ | ˈdʒɔe̯.oˑ ɦeˑ | ˈdʒɔe̯.oˑ ɦeˑ |] [ˈdʒɔe̯.oˑ ˈdʒɔe̯.oˑ ˈdʒɔe̯.oˑ ˈdʒɔe̯.oˑ ɦeˑ ‖]

=== Official lyrics ===
Official Government of India text in Devanagari	Official romanisation (bold indicates long vowels)	Devanagari transliteration (ISO 15919)	IPA transcription
जन-गण-मन-अधिनायक जय हे भारत भाग्य विधाता। पंजाब-सिन्धु-गुजरात-मराठा द्राविड़-उत्कल-बंग विंध्य हिमाचल यमुना गंगा उच्छल जलधि तरंग तव शुभ नामे जागे, तव शुभ आशिष मागे गाहे तव जय-गाथा। जन-गण-मंगलदायक जय हे भारत भाग्य विधाता। जय हे, जय हे, जय हे, जय जय जय जय हे।	Jana-gana-mana-adhin**a**yaka jaya he Bh**a**rata-bh**a**gya-vidh**a**t**a**. Panj**a**ba-Sindh-Gujar**a**ta-Mar**a**th**a**; Dr**a**vida-Utkala-Banga; Vindhya-Him**a**chala-Yamun**a**-Gang**a**; Uchchhala-jaladhi-taranga; Tava (Note: "taba" is also used) subha n**a**m**e** j**a**g**e**, tava subha **a**sisa m**a**g**e** g**a**h**e** tava jaya-g**a**th**a**. Jana-gana-mangala-d**a**yaka jaya h**e** Bh**a**rata-bh**a**gya-vidh**a**t**a**. Jaya h**e**, jaya h**e**, jaya h**e**, jaya jaya jaya jaya h**e**.	Jana-gaṇa-mana adhināyaka jaya hē Bhārata-bhāgya-vidhātā. Paṁjāba-Sindhu (Note: "Sindh" is also used.)-Gujarāta-Marāṭhā, Drāviṛa-Utkala Baṁga; Vindhya Himācala Yamunā Gaṁgā, Ucchala jaladhi taraṁga Tava śubha nāmē jāgē, tava śubha āśiṣa māgē gāhē tava jaya gāthā. Jana gaṇa maṁgala-dāyaka jaya hē, Bhārata bhāgya vidhātā. Jaya hē, jaya hē, jaya hē, jaya jaya jaya jaya hē.	[ˈdʒɐ.nɐ ˈɡɐ.ɳɐ ˈmɐ.nɐ ɐ.d̪ʱi.ˈnɑː.jɐ.kɐ ˈdʒɐ.jɐ ˈɦeː] [ˈbʱɑː.ɾɐ.t̪ɐ ˈbʱɑːɡ.jɐ ʋɪ.ˈd̪ʱɑː.t̪ɑː ǁ] [pɐn.ˈdʒɑː.bɐ ˈsɪn̪.d̪ʱʊ ɡʊ.dʒɐ.ˈɾɑː.t̪ɐ mɐ.ˈɾɑː.ʈʰɑː |] [ˈd̪ɾɑː.ʋɪ.ɽɐ ˈʊt̪.kɐ.lɐ ˈbɐŋ.ɡɐ] [ˈʋɪn̪d̪ʱ.jɐ ɦɪ.ˈmɑː.tʃɐ.lɐ jɐ.mʊ.ˈnɑː ˈɡɐŋ.ɡɑː |] [ˈʊt.tʃʰɐ.lɐ ˈdʒɐ.lɐ.d̪ʱi t̪ɐ.ˈɾɐŋ.ɡɐ] [ˈt̪ɐ.ʋɐ (Note: [t̪ɐ.bɐ] is also used) ˈʃʊ.bʱɐ ˈnɑː.meː ˈdʒɑː.ɡeː] [ˈt̪ɐ.ʋɐ ˈʃʊ.bʱɐ ˈɑː.ʃɪ.ʂɐ ˈmɑː.ɡeː] [ˈɡɑː.ɦeː ˈt̪ɐ.ʋɐ ˈdʒɐ.jɐ ˈgɑː.t̪ʰɑː ‖] [ˈdʒɐ.nɐ ˈɡɐ.ɳɐ ˈmɐŋ.ɡɐ.lɐ ˈd̪ɑː.jɐ.kɐ ˈdʒɐ.jɐ ɦeː |] [ˈbʱɑː.ɾɐ.t̪ɐ ˈbʱɑːɡ.jɐ ʋɪ.ˈd̪ʱɑː.t̪ɑː ‖] [ˈdʒɐ.jɐ ˈɦeː | ˈdʒɐ.jɐ ˈɦeː | ˈdʒɐ.jɐ ˈɦeː |] [ˈdʒɐ.jɐ ˈdʒɐ.jɐ ˈdʒɐ.jɐ ˈdʒɐ.jɐ ˈɦeː ‖]

=== English lyrics ===
The English version was translated by Rabindranath Tagore himself on 28 February 1919 at the Besant Theosophical College.

Official English version

Thou art the ruler of the minds of all people,
dispenser of India's destiny.
Thy name rouses the hearts of the Punjab, Sindh, Gujarat and Maratha;
of the Dravida, Orissa and Bengal.
It echoes in the hills of the Vindhyas and Himalayas, mingles in the music of the Yamuna and Ganges
and is chanted by the waves of the Indian Ocean.
They pray for Thy blessings and sing Thy praise.
The saving of all people waits in thy hand,
Thou dispenser of India's destiny.
Victory, Victory, Victory to thee.

Literal English translation

Victory to the Lord of the minds of all the people,
The dispenser of India's destiny!
Punjab, Sindh, Gujarat, Maratha,
Dravida, Utkala, Bengal;
The Vindhyas, Himalayas, Yamunas, the Ganges,
The wavering waves of the ocean all arise in your auspicious name,
Seek your auspicious blessings, sing your victory lore.
Victory to the graciousness of the people,
The dispenser of India's destiny!
Victory! Victory! Victory!
Victory, victory, victory, victory to you!

=== Abridged version ===
A short version consisting of the first and last lines of the National Anthem is also played on certain occasions.

Devanagari script

जन-गण-मन अधिनायक जय हे भारत भाग्य विधाता ।
जय हे, जय हे, जय हे, जय जय जय जय हे ।

Official romanisation
(bold indicates long vowels)

Jana-gana-mana-adhin**a**yaka jaya h**e** Bh**a**rat-bh**a**gya vidh**a**t**a**.
Jaya h**e**, jaya h**e**, jaya h**e**, jaya jaya jaya jaya h**e**.

Latin transliteration
(ISO 15919)

Jana-gaṇa-mana adhināyaka jaya hē Bhārata-bhāgya-vidhātā.
Jaya hē, jaya hē, jaya hē, jaya jaya jaya jaya hē.

Latin transliteration

(IAST Pali)

jana gaṇa mana adhināyaka jayahē,

bhārata bhāgya vidhātā!

jayahē! jayahē! jayahē! jaya jaya jaya jayahē!

IPA transcription (Note: See Help:IPA/Hindi and Urdu, Hindi phonology, Help:IPA/Sanskrit, and Sanskrit phonology.)

[ˈdʒɐ.nɐ ˈɡɐ.ɳɐ ˈmɐ.nɐ ɐ.d̪ʱi.ˈnɑː.jɐ.kɐ ˈdʒɐ.jɐ ˈɦeː] [ˈbʱɑː.ɾɐ.t̪ɐ ˈbʱɑːɡ.jɐ ʋɪ.ˈd̪ʱɑː.t̪ɑː ǁ]
[ˈdʒɐ.jɐ ˈɦeː | ˈdʒɐ.jɐ ˈɦeː | ˈdʒɐ.jɐ ˈɦeː |] [ˈdʒɐ.jɐ ˈdʒɐ.jɐ ˈdʒɐ.jɐ ˈdʒɐ.jɐ ˈɦeː ‖]

=== Raga ===
"Jana Gana Mana" is sung in the Alhaiya Bilaval raga, whereby the tivra Madhyama svara is employed, some may even classify it as raga Yaman-Kalyan or raga Gaud Sarang

=== Other transcriptions ===
Gujarati

જન ગણ મન અધિનાયક જય હે
ભારત ભાગ્ય વિધાતા।
પંજાબ સિંધુ ગુજરાત મરાઠા
દ્રાવિડ઼ ઉત્કલ બંગ
વિંધ્ય હિમાચલ યમુના ગંગા
ઉચ્છલ જલધિ તરંગ
તવ શુભ નામે જાગે
તવ શુભ આશિષ માગે
ગાહે તવ જયગાથા।
જન ગણ મંગલ દાયક જય હે
ભારત ભાગ્ય વિધાતા।
જય હે। જય હે। જય હે।
જય જય જય જય હે॥

Kannada

ಜನ-ಗಣ-ಮನ-ಅಧಿನಾಯಕ ಜಯ ಹೇ
ಭಾರತ-ಭಾಗ್ಯ-ವಿಧಾತಾ |
ಪಂಜಾಬ್-ಸಿಂಧು-ಗುಜರಾತ-ಮರಾಠಾ
ದ್ರಾವಿಡ-ಉತ್ಕಲ-ಬಂಗಾ ||
ವಿಂಧ್ಯ-ಹಿಮಾಚಲ-ಯಮುನಾ-ಗಂಗಾ
ಉಚ್ಛಲ-ಜಲಧಿ-ತರಂಗಾ |
ತವ ಶುಭ ನಾಮೇ ಜಾಗೇ
ತವ ಶುಭ ಆಶಿಷ ಮಾಗೇ
ಗಾಹೇ ತವ ಜಯಗಾಥಾ ||
ಜನ-ಗಣ-ಮಂಗಲದಾಯಕ ಜಯ ಹೇ
ಭಾರತ-ಭಾಗ್ಯ-ವಿಧಾತಾ |
ಜಯ ಹೇ, ಜಯ ಹೇ, ಜಯ ಹೇ
ಜಯ ಜಯ ಜಯ ಜಯ ಹೇ ||

Tamil

ஜன கண மன அதி நாயக ஜய ஹே,
பாரத பாக்ய விதாதா!
பஞ்சாப சிந்து குஜராத் மராட்டா,
திராவிட உத்கல வங்கா!
விந்திய ஹிமாசல யமுனா கங்கா,
உச்சல ஜல தர் தரங்கா!
தவ சுப நாமே ஜாகே,
தவ சுப ஆசிஷ மாகே,
காஹே தவ ஜெய காதா!
ஜன கண மங்கள தாயக ஜய ஹே,
பாரத பாக்ய விதாதா!
ஜய ஹே, ஜய ஹே, ஜய ஹே,
ஜய ஜய ஜய, ஜய ஹே!

Telugu

జన గణ మన అధినాయక జయ హే
భారత భాగ్య విధాతా।
పంజాబ సింధు గుజరాత మరాఠా
ద్రావిడ ఉత్కళ వంగ।
వింధ్య హిమాచల యమునా గంగా
ఉచ్ఛల జలధి తరంగ।
తవ శుభ నామే జాగే
తవ శుభ ఆశిష మాగే
గాహే తవ జయ గాథా।
జన గణ మంగళ దాయక జయ హే
భారత భాగ్య విధాతా।
జయ హే। జయ హే। జయ హే।
జయ జయ జయ జయ హే।।

Marathi

जन गण मन अधिनायक जय हे
भारत-भाग्य-विधाता!
पंजाब-सिंधु-गुजरात-मराठा,
द्राविड-उत्कल-बंग
विंध्य-हिमाचल-यमुना-गंगा,
उच्छल-जलधि-तरंग
तव शुभ नामे जागे,
तव शुभ आशिष मागे,
गाहे तव जय-गाथा।
जन-गण-मंगल-दायक जय हे,
भारत-भाग्य-विधाता!
जय हे, जय हे, जय हे,
जय जय जय, जय हे!

Sanskrit

जनगणमन अधिनायक जय हे
भारतभाग्यविधाता।
पञ्जाब सिन्धु गुजरात मराठा
द्राविड उत्कल वङ्ग।
विन्ध्य हिमाचल यमुना गङ्गा
उच्छल जलधि तरङ्ग।
तब शुभ नामे जागे
तब शुभ आशिष मागे
गाहे तब जयगाथा।
जनगणमङ्गलदायक जय हे
भारतभाग्यविधाता।
जय हे। जय हे। जय हे।
जय जय जय जय हे॥

Odia

ଜନ ଗଣ ମନ ଅଧିନାୟକ ଜୟ ହେ
ଭାରତଭାଗ୍ୟବିଧାତା!
ପଞ୍ଜାବ ସିନ୍ଧୁ ଗୁଜରାଟ ମରାଠା
ଦ୍ରାବିଡ଼ ଉତ୍କଳ ବଙ୍ଗ
ବିନ୍ଧ୍ୟ ହିମାଚଳ ଯମୁନା ଗଙ୍ଗା ଉଚ୍ଛଳଜଳଧିତରଙ୍ଗ
ତବ ଶୁଭ ନାମେ ଜାଗେ
ତବ ଶୁଭ ଆଶିଷ ମାଗେ,
ଗାହେ ତବ ଜୟଗାଥା।
ଜନଗଣମଙ୍ଗଳଦାୟକ ଜୟ ହେ
ଭାରତଭାଗ୍ୟବିଧାତା!
ଜୟ ହେ, ଜୟ ହେ, ଜୟ ହେ,
ଜୟ ଜୟ ଜୟ ଜୟ ହେ॥

== Gallery ==
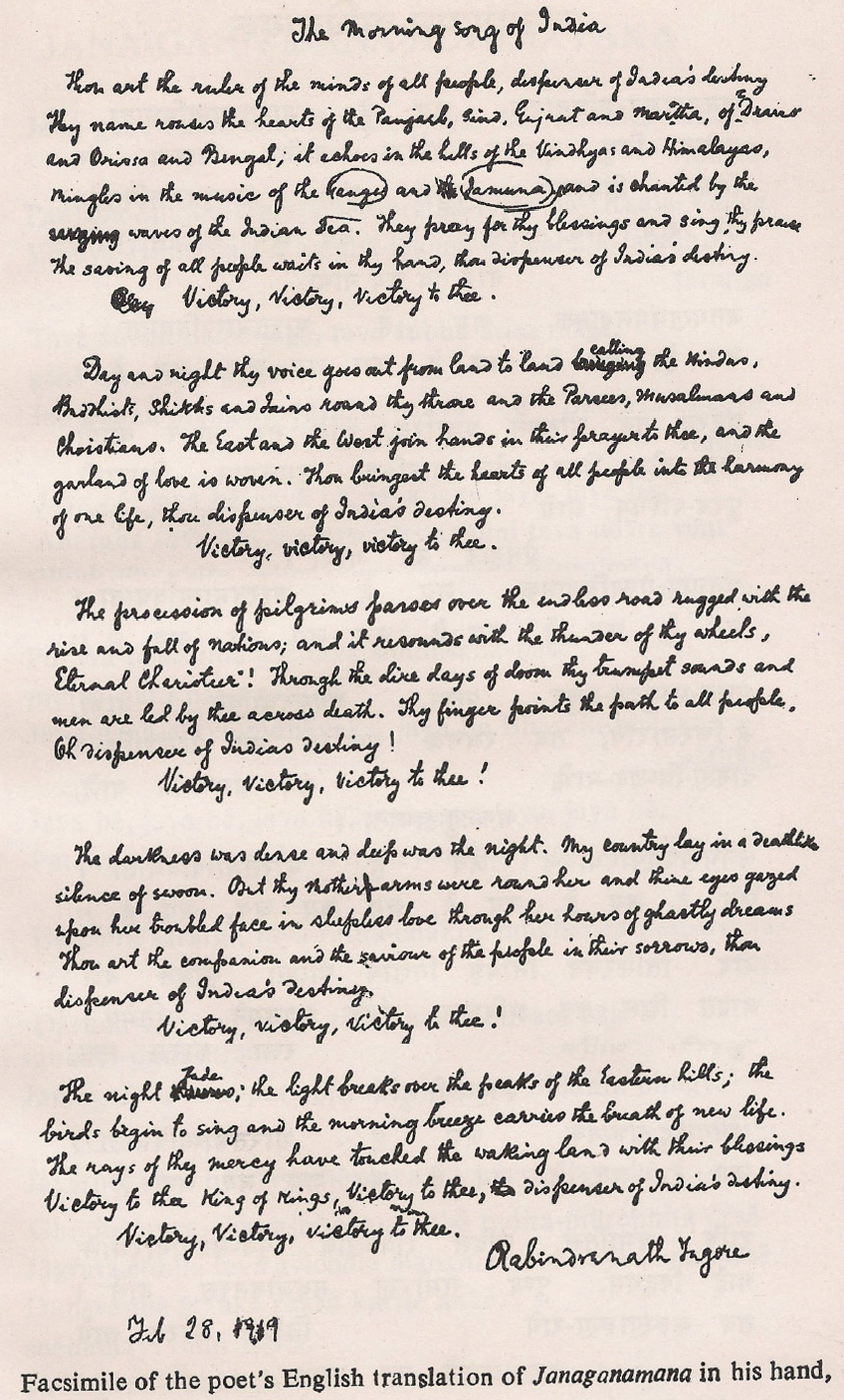
Tagore's translation of "Jana Gana Mana" on 28 February 1919, at the Besant Theosophical College

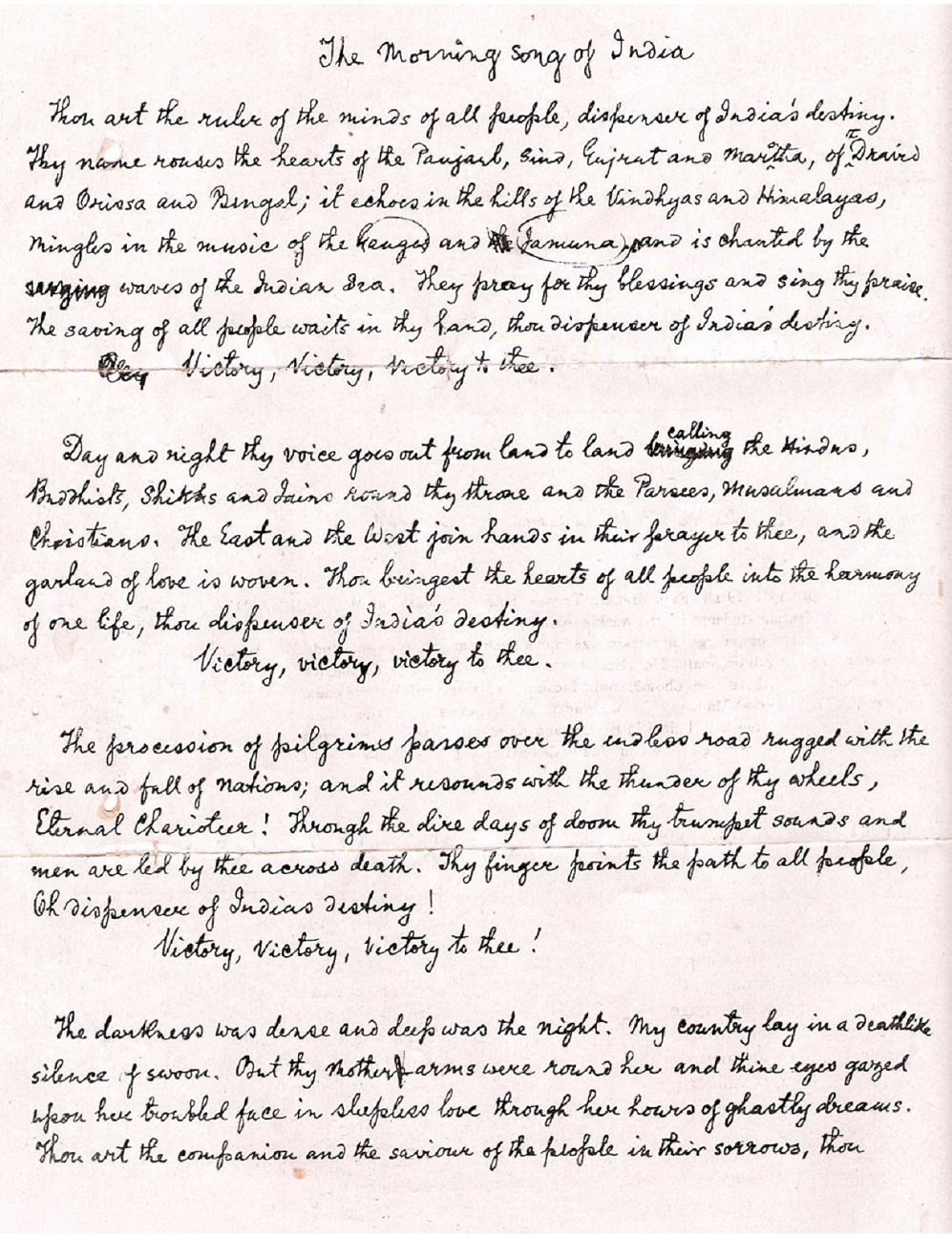
Page 1 of Tagore's translation of "Jana Gana Mana" on 28 February 1919, at the Besant Theosophical College

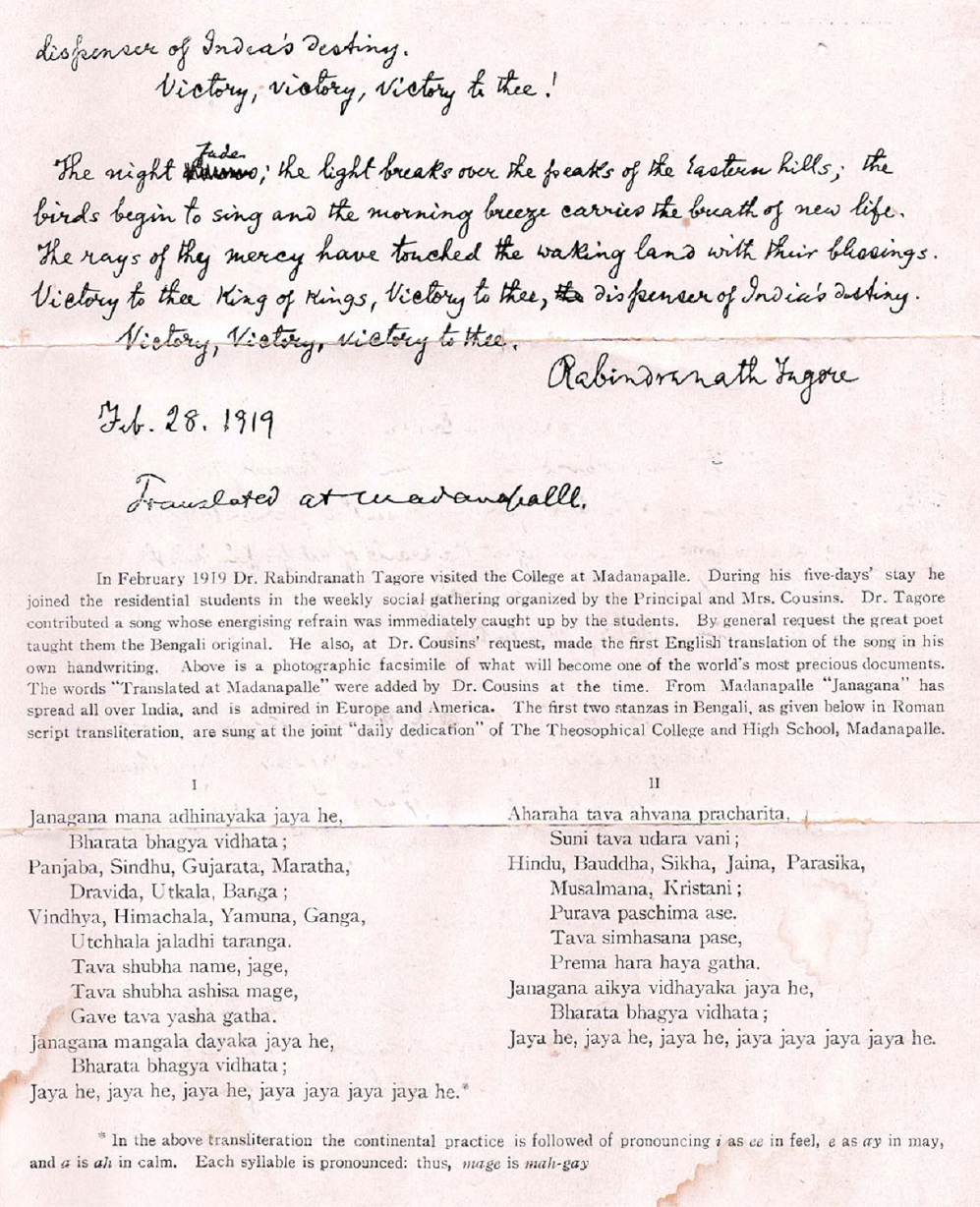
Page 2 of Tagore's translation of "Jana Gana Mana" on 28 February 1919, at the Besant Theosophical College

== Controversies ==
=== Historical significance ===
The composition was first sung during a convention of the Indian National Congress in Calcutta on 27 December 1911. It was sung on the second day of the convention. The event was reported as such in the British Indian press:

"The Bengali poet Rabindranath Tagore sang a song composed by him specially to welcome the Emperor." (Statesman, 28 December 1911)
"The proceedings began with the singing by Rabindranath Tagore of a song specially composed by him in honour of the Emperor." (Englishman, 28 December 1911)
"When the proceedings of the Indian National Congress began on Wednesday 27 December 1911, a Bengali song in welcome of the Emperor was sung. A resolution welcoming the Emperor and Empress was also adopted unanimously." (Indian, 29 December 1911)

Many historians aver that the newspaper reports cited above were misguided. The confusion arose in the Indian press since a different song, "Badshah Humara" written in Hindi by Rambhuj Chaudhary, was sung on the same occasion in praise of George V. The nationalist press in India stated this difference of events clearly:

"The proceedings of the Congress party session started with a prayer in Bengali to praise God (song of benediction). This was followed by a resolution expressing loyalty to King George V. Then another song was sung welcoming King George V." (Amrita Bazar Patrika, 28 December 1911)
"The annual session of Congress began by singing a song composed by the great Bengali poet Rabindranath Tagore. Then a resolution expressing loyalty to King George V was passed. A song paying a heartfelt homage to King George V was then sung by a group of boys and girls." (The Bengalee, 28 December 1911)

Even the report of the annual session of the Indian National Congress of December 1911 stated this difference:

"On the first day of 28th annual session of the Congress, proceedings started after singing Vande Mataram. On the second day the work began after singing a patriotic song by Babu Rabindranath Tagore. Messages from well-wishers were then read and a resolution was passed expressing loyalty to King George V. Afterwards the song composed for welcoming King George V and Queen Mary was sung."

On 10 November 1937, Tagore wrote a letter to Pulin Bihari Sen about the controversy. That letter in Bengali can be found in Tagore's biography Rabindrajibani, volume II page 339 by Prabhatkumar Mukherjee.

"A certain high official in His Majesty's service, who was also my friend, had requested that I write a song of felicitation towards the Emperor. The request simply amazed me. It caused a great stir in my heart. In response to that great mental turmoil, I pronounced the victory in Jana Gana Mana of that Bhagya Bidhata [ed. God of Destiny] of India who has from age after age held steadfast the reins of India's chariot through rise and fall, through the straight path and the curved. That Lord of Destiny, that Reader of the Collective Mind of India, that Perennial Guide, could never be George V, George VI, or any other George. Even my official friend understood this about the song. After all, even if his admiration for the crown was excessive, he was not lacking in simple common sense."

Again in his letter of 19 March 1939, Tagore writes:

"I should only insult myself if I cared to answer those who consider me capable of such unbounded stupidity as to sing in praise of George the Fourth or George the Fifth as the Eternal Charioteer leading the pilgrims on their journey through countless ages of the timeless history of mankind." (Purvasa, Phalgun, 1354, p. 738.)

These clarifications by Tagore regarding the controversy occurred only after the death of King George V in 1936. Earlier, in 1915, after Tagore was awarded the Nobel Literature Prize, George V had conferred a knighthood on him, which he renounced in 1919 in protest over the Jallianwala Bagh massacre; writing a letter addressed to the viceroy of India Lord Chelmsford: "The time has come when badges of honour make our shame glaring in their incongruous context of humiliation, and I for my part wish to stand, shorn of all special distinctions, by the side of my country men."

=== Singing ===
In Kerala, students belonging to the Jehovah's Witnesses religious denomination were expelled by school authorities for their refusal to sing the national anthem on religious grounds, although they stood up when the anthem was sung. The Kerala High Court concluded that there was nothing in it which could offend anyone's religious susceptibilities, and upheld their expulsion. On 11 August 1986, the Supreme Court reversed the High Court and ruled that the High Court had misdirected itself because the question is not whether a particular religious belief or practice appeals to our reason or sentiment but whether the belief is genuinely and conscientiously held as part of the profession or practice of religion. "Our personal views and reactions are irrelevant." The Supreme Court affirmed the principle that it is not for a secular judge to sit in judgment on the correctness of a religious belief.

The Supreme Court observed in its ruling that:

There is no provision of law which obliges anyone to sing the National Anthem nor is it disrespectful to the National Anthem if a person who stands up respectfully when the National Anthem is sung does not join the singing. Proper respect is shown to the National Anthem by standing up when the National Anthem is sung. It will not be right to say that disrespect is shown by not joining in the singing. Standing up respectfully when the National Anthem is sung but not singing oneself clearly does not either prevent the singing of the National Anthem or cause disturbance to an assembly engaged in such singing so as to constitute the offence mentioned in s. 3 of the Prevention of Insults to National Honour Act.

In some states, the anthem must be played before films are played at cinemas. On 30 November 2016, to instil "committed patriotism and nationalism", the Supreme Court ordered that all cinemas nationwide must play the national anthem, accompanied by an image of the flag of India, before all films. Patrons were expected to stand in respect of the anthem, and doors to a cinema hall were expected to be locked during the anthem to minimise disruption. The order was controversial, as it was argued that patrons who chose not to participate would be targeted and singled out, as was the case in an incident publicised in 2015 which purported to show a group of patrons (alleged by the YouTube uploader to be Muslims) being heckled by others. On 10 February 2017, two Kashmiris (which included an employee of the state government) were arrested under the Prevention of Insults to National Honour Act for not standing during the anthem at a cinema, in the first such arrest of its kind made by a state government. On 3 July 2023, an executive magistrate in Srinagar sent 11 men to jail for a week, allegedly not rising for the anthem at a 25 June event in the presence of J&K Lt Governor Manoj Sinha. Other incidents of violent outbreaks associated with the policy were also reported.

A cinema club in Kerala (whose film festival was required to comply with the order, leading to several arrests) challenged the order as an infringement of their fundamental rights, arguing that cinemas were "singularly unsuited for the gravitas and sobriety that must accompany the playing of the national anthem", and that the films screened would often "be at odds with sentiments of national respect". In October 2017, Justice Dhananjaya Y. Chandrachud questioned the intent of the order, arguing that citizens "don't have to wear patriotism on our sleeve", and that it should not be assumed that people who do not stand for the anthem were any less patriotic than those who did. In January 2018, the order was lifted, pending further government discussion.

In October 2019, a video of a Bengaluru couple being bullied for not standing up during the national anthem in a movie hall went viral. They were questioned "Are you Pakistani?". There was a debate on the issue; some lawyers recalled Article 21, some people called it a way to gain media attention and some recommended attending the movie after the national anthem is played to avoid any problems. But after the debate, the Supreme Court reversed its earlier order making it mandatory for cinema halls to play the National Anthem.

=== Regional aspects ===
Another controversy is that only those provinces that were under direct British rule, i.e. Punjab (Punjab Province), Sindh, Gujarat, Maratha (Bombay Presidency), Dravida (Madras Presidency), Utkala (Orissa) and Bengal (Bengal Presidency), were mentioned. None of the princely states – Jammu and Kashmir, Rajputana, Central India Agency, Hyderabad, Mysore or the states in Northeast India (erstwhile Assam), which are now parts of India, were mentioned. However, opponents of this proposition claim that Tagore mentioned only the border states of India to include complete India. Whether the princely states would form a part of an independent Indian republic was a matter of debate even until Indian independence.

In 2005, there were calls to delete the word "Sind" (Note: From the Sanskrit term Sindhu. Historical romanisation of Sindh, referring to the Sind province of British India.) and substitute it with the word Kashmir. The argument was that Sindh was no longer a part of India, having become part of Pakistan as a result of the Partition of 1947. Opponents of this proposal hold that the word "Sind" refers to the Indus River (Note: Indus (Sindhu), flows through Ladakh in Northern India.) and Sindhi culture and that Sindhi people are a part of India's cultural fabric. The Supreme Court of India declined to change the national anthem and the wording remains unchanged.

On 17 December 2013, MLA of Assam, Phani Bhushan Choudhury cited an article in The Times of India published on 26 January 1950, stating that originally the word "Kamarup" was included in the song, but was later changed to "Sindhu" and claimed that Kamarup should be re-included. To this, the then minister Rockybul Hussain replied that the state government would initiate steps in this regard after a response from the newspaper. The debate was further joined by the then minister Ardhendu Dey, mentioning "Sanchayita" (edited by Tagore himself) etc. where he said Kamarup was not mentioned.

In 2017 the state government of Jharkhand under the Bharatiya Janata Party proposed making the singing of the national anthem compulsory in Madrasas. This was met with opposition from a section of Muslim clerics because it allegedly violated the basic principles of the Islamic centres of learning.

== Notable events ==
=== Guinness World Record ===
As of the last retrieval, Jana Gana Mana holds the record of the most people singing a national/regional anthem simultaneously.

== See also ==
- "Amar Shonar Bangla" – the national Anthem of Bangladesh, also written by Rabindranath Tagore
- "Banglar Mati Banglar Jol" – the state song of West Bengal, also written by Rabindranath Tagore
- National Pledge
- "Saare Jahan Se Achcha" – an ode to Hindustan
- "Vande Mataram" – the national song of India
