= Charlie Harbour =

Australian rules footballer

Personal information
- Full name: Edmond Charles Harbour
- Born: 20 June 1924; Foster, Victoria
- Died: 24 August 1988 (aged 64); Preston, Victoria
- Height: 183 cm (6 ft 0 in)
- Weight: 76 kg (168 lb)

Playing career^{1}
Years	Club	Games (Goals)
1945–46	St Kilda	7 (0)
- ^{1} Playing statistics correct to the end of 1946.

Charlie Harbour (20 June 1924 – 24 August 1988) was an Australian rules footballer who played with St Kilda in the Victorian Football League (VFL).
