= William Gumley =

Australian cricketer

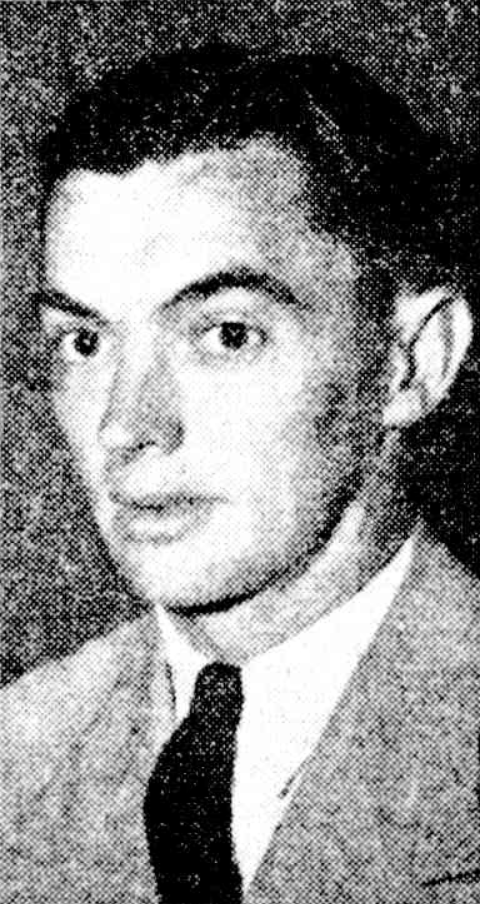

Personal information
- Born: 28 June 1923; Bangalow, New South Wales, Australia
- Died: 14 August 1988 (aged 65); Brisbane, Queensland, Australia
- Source: Cricinfo, 3 October 2020

William Gumley (28 June 1923 – 14 August 1988) was an Australian cricketer. He played in two first-class matches for Queensland in 1948/49.

== See also ==
- List of Queensland first-class cricketers
