= Xuân Quỳnh =

Vietnamese poet

Xuân Quỳnh (6 October 1942 – 29 August 1988) was a famous modern female Vietnamese poet. She, her husband Lưu Quang Vũ, and their 13-year-old son Lưu Quỳnh Thơ died in a car accident in Hải Dương city on 29 August 1988.

On 6 October 2019, she was honored with a Google Doodle.
