= Lưu Quang Vũ =

Vietnamese playwright and poet

Lưu Quang Vũ (Note: In this Vietnamese name, the surname is Lưu, but is often simplified to Luu in English-language text. In accordance with Vietnamese custom, this person should be referred to by the given name, Vũ.) (17 April 1948 – 29 August 1988) was a Vietnamese playwright and poet. His wife Xuân Quỳnh was a Vietnamese poet. Both parents and their 12-year-old son Lưu Quỳnh Thơ were killed in a traffic collision in 1988. In 2000 he was posthumously awarded the Ho Chi Minh Prize for his play The Ninth Pledge (Lời thề thứ 9).

He is the father of Lưu Minh Vũ, who is known as one of the hosts in the Vietnamese version of The Price Is Right.

== Works ==
=== Poetry ===
- Hương cây - Scents of the tree (1968)
- Mây trắng của đời tôi - White clouds of my life (1989).
- Bầy ong trong đêm sâu - Bees in a late night (1993)
- other works in collections

=== Theatre ===
- Sống mãi tuổi 17 - Forever 17
- Nàng Sita - Sita
- Hẹn ngày trở lại - We'll see each other again
- Nếu anh không đốt lửa - If you didn't light a fire
- Hồn Trương Ba da hàng thịt - Truong Ba's soul in the Butcher's skin
- Lời thề thứ 9 - The ninth oath
- Khoảnh khắc và vô tận - An instant and the eternity
- Bệnh sĩ - Egotism
- Tôi và chúng ta - Me and Us
- Người tốt nhà số 5 - The good man at the 5th
- Chiếc ô công lý - The justice umbrella
- Ông không phải là bố tôi - You're not my father
- Lời nói dối cuối cùng - The last lie
