= Violet Hackbarth =

American baseball player

- First base
- Born: October 27, 1919; Lebanon, Dodge County, Wisconsin, U.S.
- Died: August 8, 1988 (aged 68); Watertown, Wisconsin, U.S.

Teams
- Muskegon Lassies (1946)

Violet Frieda Hockbein (née Hackbarth; October 27, 1919 – August 8, 1988) was an All-American Girls Professional Baseball League player.

According to All American League data, Violet Hackbarth played in the league in its 1946 season. Nevertheless, additional information is incomplete because there are no records available at the time of the request.

The league folded in 1954, but there is a permanent display at the Baseball Hall of Fame and Museum at Cooperstown, New York, since 1988 that honors the entire league rather than any individual figure.
