= Joe Bruce (footballer) =

Australian rules footballer, born 1905

Personal information
- Full name: Joe Bruce
- Born: 2 January 1905
- Died: 9 August 1988 (aged 83)

Playing career^{1}
Years	Club	Games (Goals)
1929	North Melbourne	1 (0)
- ^{1} Playing statistics correct to the end of 1929.

Joe Bruce (2 January 1905 – 9 August 1988) was an Australian rules footballer who played with North Melbourne in the Victorian Football League (VFL).
