= Kōri Hisataka =

Karateka

Kori Hisataka
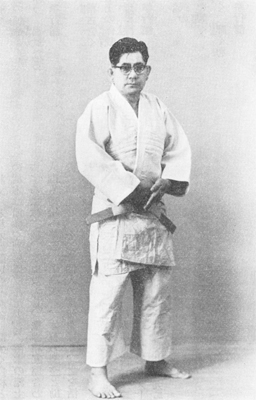
- Born: Seiki Kudaka; April 22, 1907; Shuri, Okinawa
- Died: August 14, 1988 (aged 81); Tokyo, Japan
- Other names: Masayoshi Hisataka, Seiki Kudaka
- Style: Shorinjiryu Kenkokan Karate
- Teachers: Chotoku Kyan, Sanda Kanagusuku

Other information
- Notable students: Masayuki Hisataka, Shunji Watanabe, Shigeru Ishino, Tamon Kashimoto

Masayoshi Kori Hisataka (久高 政祺 幸利, Hisataka Masayoshi Kōri; Seiki Kudaka in Okinawan; April 22, 1907 – August 14, 1988) was the founder of Shorinjiryu Kenkokan Karate.

== Biography ==
Born in Shuri (Naha City in Okinawa), he was a descendant of Seiwa, the 56th Emperor of Japan. He studied karate, kobudo and jujutsu, most notably karate from Chotoku Kyan and weapons from kobudo pioneer (and former Prefectural police superintendent), Sanda Kanagusuku. He also learned the Kudaka family art of weapons known as Shishiryu, and the family art of Okinawa-te from his father (Seisei Kudaka), an uncle and his grandfather. Hisataka completed a period of service in the Japanese military.

In August 1930, he toured Taiwan with Chotoku Kyan and Ryosei Kuwae demonstrating karate at the Taipei Butokuden and participating in a number of challenge matches. Upon returning to Japan he studied judo at the Kodokan with Sanpo Toku and achieved 4th dan within a year of training. He studied kendo and competed at Police Department competitions.

During World War II, he was sent to Manchuria and assigned as a station master along the railway at various locations. When possible he would practice karate and judo, and studied Chinese martial arts with a master of Hakkyoku kempo. He is credited with saving both Chinese and Japanese lives during his stint as station master.

After World War II, he returned to Japan to find that the Japanese people were demoralized by the war so he placed a greater emphasis on spiritual development of the individual through karate training. He founded the first Shorinjiryu Kenkokan Karate dojo in Oshima Park, Hamada village, in Kumamoto prefecture, Kyūshū in 1945. He later relocated the dojo to Shimo-Kitagawa in Tokyo's Setagaya Ward. In 1955, he opened his Shorinjiryu Kenkokan Karate headquarters in the Waseda area of Shinjuku Ward, Tokyo.

Hisataka was also one of the first to experiment with the use of Bōgu (protective equipment) to provide safety in karate kumite. His philosophy was to "protect the targets, not the weapons", meaning that protective equipment should cover the vital targets on the body, as opposed to wearing gloves and shin pads to cover the hands and feet. His son, Masayuki Hisataka has continued this approach, having gone on to create the Supersafe Anzen Bogu protective equipment used in the Koshiki Karate competition system.

== Death and legacy ==
Masayoshi Kori Hisataka died in Tokyo, Japan on August 14, 1988. His legacy continues on today through the practitioners of Shorinjiryu Kenkokan Karate (headed by his son Masayuki Hisataka) and the various derivative schools based on Shorinjiryu Kenkokan Karatedo. Other than Masayuki Hisataka, two of Masayoshi Kori Hisataka's direct students are teaching to this day, including Shunji Watanabe (Shorinjiryu Kenyukai Watanabe Ha) and Shigeru Ishino (Ishino Shorinjiryu Genbukan Karate).

While he was actively teaching, Hisataka utilised the title Shinan, and many of his former students from that era, and their descendent students, continue to respect him with this title. At some point after his retirement from active teaching, the members of his Shorinjiryu Kenkokan organisation began using the honorific title of Kaiso.

== Innovations ==
He made several other innovations to karate training including:

- Use of the heel when kicking
- Whole body is put into action when executing a technique, using a follow through motion
- Use of the vertical fist (tate ken)
- Practice of yakusoku kumite
- Use of protective equipment to allow the karatedo student to really test their techniques without having to hold back their power
- Practice of weapons (buki ho)

== Sources ==
- "Scientific Karatedo" (1976) by Masayuki Kukan Hisataka
- "Essential Shorinjiryu Karatedo" by Masayuki Kukan Hisataka
