= Shōrinjiryū Kenkōkan Karate =

Style of karate

Shōrinjiryū Kenkōkan Karate (少林寺流拳行館唐手)
- Date founded: 1945
- Country of origin: Japan
- Founder: Kōri Hisataka (1907–1988)
- Current head: Masayuki Hisataka (1940-Present)
- Arts taught: Karate, Okinawan Kobudo
- Ancestor arts: Okinawan Martial Arts, Judo
- Ancestor schools: Shuri-te
- Descendant schools: Shorinjiryu Kenyukai Watanabe-Ha • Shorinjiryu Genbukan • Shorinjiryu Kenryukan • Shorinjiryu Kentokukan • Shorinjiryu Koshinkai
- Practitioners: Masayuki Hisataka, Shunji Watanabe

Shōrinjiryū Kenkōkan Karate (少林寺流拳行館唐手) is a style of karate founded by Kōri Hisataka (Seiki Kudaka in Okinawan) (1907–1988) shortly after World War II in Japan.

It consists of the primary arts of Shōrinjiryū Kenkōkan Okinawan karate and Okinawan Kobudo, as taught to the founder by masters including Chotoku Kyan and Sanda Kanagusuku, as well as Judo, which Kori Hisataka studied at the Kodokan, obtaining the rank of 4th Dan after only 1 years training. Other component arts include Aikijutsu and Chinese Bajiquan, which the founder studied on his extensive tours of Japan, China and Asia.

The style is responsible for a number of innovations to karate training including:

- Use of the heel when kicking
- Whole body is put into action when executing a technique, using a follow through motion
- Use of the vertical fist (tate ken)
- Practice of yakusoku kumite
- Use of protective equipment to allow the karatedo student to test their techniques without having to hold back their power
- Practice of weapons (buki ho)

In some aspects, Shorinjiryu Karate has a strong resemblance to Japanese Koryu Budo, in that it has a great emphasis on pre-arranged two-person drills (yakusoku kumite). One person kata is an important practice, and the main kata taught in the style in its early days were versions of Naihanchin, Nijushiho, Sanchin, Chinto and Kusanku, as well as a Bō (6 ft staff) kata (Shishiryu no Bo), a Jo (4 ft staff) kata and a Sai (iron truncheon) kata (Nijushiho no Sai). Other kata were introduced later, mainly by the son of the founder, Masayuki Hisataka.

Following Kori Hisataka's retirement in 1974, his son Masayuki Hisataka took over as head of the organization. He has expanded the reach of the style worldwide and trained karateka all over the world.

== Grading structure ==
Like many styles of karate to date, the grading structure runs on a belt system, with 10 coloured belt levels (Kyū) for non-black holders (mudansha) and 10 levels (dan) for black belt holders (yudansha). The following describes the grading structure utilised by the Shorinjiryu Kenkokan organisation and many of the descendant schools. Other descendant schools may utilise alternative structures, though all use ten levels for black belt holders.

The 10 levels of coloured belts used in Shorinjiryu Kenkokan and many descendent schools are:

- 10th kyu - White belt
- 9th kyu - Yellow/White stripe
- 8th kyu - Yellow belt
- 7th kyu - Orange/White Stripe
- 6th kyu - Orange belt
- 5th kyu - Green/White Stripe
- 4th kyu - Green belt
- 3rd kyu - Brown/White Stripe
- 2nd kyu - Brown belt
- 1st kyu - Black/White Stripe

Black belt holders (yudansha) all wear a black belt that may be embroidered with the holder's name and style. There are ceremonial belts for high-ranking black belts, including the red and white panelled belt for holders of 6th, 7th and 8th Dan, and a red belt for 9th and 10th Dan masters. Some derivative schools of Shorinjiryu Kenkokan utilise additional ceremonial belts.

Masayuki Hisataka is currently the highest graded proponent of the Shorinjiryu Kenkokan organisation, holding the rank of 9th Dan and the title of Hanshi.

== International Mainline Branches ==
The mainline Shorinjiryu Kenkokan Karate Do is represented around the world by its international branches directly affiliated to the Shorinjiryu Kenkokan Karate Hombu Dojo in Japan. Some of the major locations and the senior instructors include:

- Japan: Masayuki Hisataka 9th Dan, Hiroshi Hisataka 6th Dan, Masamitsu Kudaka 7th Dan, Masaki Enomoto 6th Dan
- Australia: Scott Brown 6th Dan
- USA: Mega Martinez 6th Dan
- Canada: Philippe Nadeau 7th Dan
- Germany: Olaf Lotze-Leoni 7th Dan
- New Zealand: Shaun O'Leary 5th Dan
- Switzerland: Mamadou Diallo 6th Dan
- Venezuela: Kunio Tanabe 6th Dan
- Spain: Luis Peres Santiago 5th Dan
- Netherlands: Peter Lerk 4th Dan

== Descendent Schools ==
Over the years, a number of individuals and organisations have branched out to form new schools based on Shorinjiryu Kenkokan Karate. These may include individuals who were direct students of the founder, Kori Hisataka, or the current international head master, Masayuki Hisataka. As with the mainline Shorinjiryu Kenkokan school, each of these descendent schools, their founders and current chief instructors have continued to evolve organisationally, and in technique and teaching approaches. Some, such as the Shorinjiryu Kenyukai Watanabe-Ha school have "carefully preserved the styles and principles taught" by the founder, while others have introduced new techniques, forms and training approaches. These descendent schools include:

- USA: Shorinjiryu Kenyukai Watanaba-Ha: 'Shunji Watanabe 9th Dan Hanshi (direct student of the Kori Hisataka)
- Shorinjiryu Genbukan: Shigeru Ishino 7th Dan (direct student of the Kori Hisataka)
- USA: Nanzenkai Tokyo Karate: Tamon Kashimoto (student of Kori Hisataka)
- USA: Nido Ichi Shinto Ryu: Evan Marcus 7th dan (student of Ken Mack)
- USA: Shorinjiryu Kenryukan: Myron Lubitsch 9th Dan
- USA: Shorinjiryu Ake no Myojo Budo: Peter Hiltz, 7th Dan
- Canada: Shorinjiryu Kentokukan: Wayne Donivan 9th Dan
- Canada: Shorinjiryu Shindo Budo Kwai: Michel Laurin 9th Dan
- Canada: Shorinjiryu Kudaka: Doug Roberts 9th Dan
- Canada: Shorinjiryu Kenshin: Manny Hawthorne 7th Dan (student of Masayuki Hisataka & Wayne Donivan)
- Canada: Bubishido: Jeffrey Henderson, 7th Dan (student of Hanshi Hisataka & Wayne Donivan)"The International Budo Institute - Bubishido". i-budo.com.
- Canada: Shorinjiryu Ken Sei Kai: Tom Bellazzi, 7th Dan
- Australia Shorinjiryu Koshinkai: Jim Griffin 7th Dan and Max Estens 7th Dan

The above organisations are independent of the mainline Shorinjiryu Kenkokan organisation, but largely base their teachings on that style as developed by the founder and/or the current headmaster.

== Other Schools Influenced by Shorinjiryu Kenkokan Karatedo ==
Over the years, a number of practitioners of karatedo in particular, or budo in general, have been influenced by Shorinjiryu Kenkokan Karatedo, either directly from the founder, Kori Hisataka, current headmaster, Masayuki Hisataka or other senior practitioners of the style. Some of these individuals have gone on to found their own schools, and have integrated aspects of Shorinjiyru Kenkokan into their own school. As they have blended other significant components into the school, these have not been classified into the list of Descendent Schools (above), but are listed below to recognise the fact that they are unique schools based on the foundation of Shorinjiryu Kenkokan Karatedo.

- Canada/Iran: Kan Zen Ryu - Farhad Varasteh
- Australia: United Karate Brotherhood - Patrick McKean (student of Scott Brown)
- USA: " Mouko-Ken " (Fierce Tiger Fist) Shito-Ryu Karate-Do - John Gaddy 8th Dan

== Buki-Ho (Weapons) ==
In its early days, Shorinjiryu Kenkokan Karatedo practice featured heavy use of a variety of Okinawan weapons, including the Bo (6 ft staff), jo (4 ft staff) and sai (iron truncheon) as the primary weapons, with other weapons including the yari (spear), kai (oar), bokken (wooden sword), tanbo (stick) and occasionally the katana (Japanese sword) also being practiced. The three primary weapons were emphasised as they represented short, medium and long range weapons.

In more recent times, the Shorinjiryu Kenkokan Karatedo So Hombu dojo (along with its various mainline branches) stresses the Bo, Sai and sword, with the sword effectively replacing the Jo as the primary mid-range weapon. Various descendent schools practice a combination of the original primary and support weapons.

The original weapons kata taught by Kori Hisataka, still taught in some of the mainline Kenkokan branches or descendent schools, include Shishiryu no Bo (also simply known as Bo no Kata), Nijushiho no Sai (also known as Sai no Kata, or occasionally Kudaka no Sai) and Jo no Kata (also known as Kudaka no Jo, or Shishiryu no Jo). There were also various 2 person pre-arranged forms, including Bo vs Bo, Bo vs Sai and the Shin Ken Shira Ha Dori (empty hand against sword).

Other weapons forms have been added to the mix over time, and include the Gorin no Bo series of kata (Shodan, Nidan and Sandan) and Gokyoku no Ken forms created by Masayuki Hisataka. Shorinjiryu Koshinkai Karatedo also practices the Ufuchiku no Jo form that has evolved from the teachings of Sanda "Ufuchiku" Kanagusuku, one of the weapons teachers of Kori Hisataka.
