= Pydimarri Venkata Subba Rao =

Composer of the Indian National Pledge

- Born: 10 June 1916; Anneparthy, Nalgonda, Telangana, India
- Died: 13 August 1988 (aged 72)
- Citizenship: India
- Writing career
- Genre: Writer
- Notable works: Kalabhairavudu, Author of National Pledge of India

Pydimarri Venkata Subba Rao (10 June 1916 – 1988) was an Indian Telugu author who is best remembered as the composer of the National Pledge of India.

== Writer and polyglot ==
Subba Rao was a native of Anneparthy village in the Nalgonda District of Telangana. He was a polyglot, having mastered Telugu, Sanskrit, English and Arabic. He was also a naturopathy doctor and a bureaucrat who wrote several books in Telugu, the most famous of which is the novel Kalabhairavudu.

== Composer of the National Pledge ==
Subba Rao composed the National Pledge in Telugu in 1962 while he was serving as the District Treasury Officer of Vishakhapatnam District of Andhra Pradesh. He was a close associate of the nationalist leader Tenneti Viswanadham, who forwarded the pledge to the then Education Minister of Andhra Pradesh, P.V.G. Raju who was also known as the Raja Garu of Vizianagaram. Raju directed all the schools in the district to have the students take the pledge and it was subsequently taken up at the national level. The Advisory Committee of the Department of Education, Government of India at its meeting in Bangalore in 1964 decided to introduce the pledge in all schools nationally from 26 January 1965. The Government of India had it translated into seven languages and directed that it be taken in schools every day. Curiously, Subba Rao himself remained unaware of the status of this pledge as the National Pledge. It was only when, after his retirement, he happened to hear his granddaughter read the pledge from a textbook that he and his family realised this. The records with the Union Human Resources Development Ministry also record him as the author of the Pledge although his family's letters to the central and state governments remained unanswered until his death in 1988.

== Golden Jubilee Celebrations ==
2012 marks the golden jubilee year of the National Pledge and there are plans afoot to commemorate it and the author as part of the celebrations.
