= National Pledge (India) =

Oath of allegiance to India

The National Pledge is an oath of allegiance to the Republic of India. It is commonly recited by Indians in unison at public events, especially in schools, and during the Independence Day and Republic Day celebrations. It is commonly found printed in the opening pages of school textbooks and calendars. It is recited in the morning assembly of most Indian schools. However, the pledge is not part of the Indian Constitution.

The pledge was originally composed in Telugu by writer Pydimarri Venkata Subba Rao in 1962. It was first read out in a school in Visakhapatnam in 1963 and was subsequently translated into various regional languages.

== Origin ==
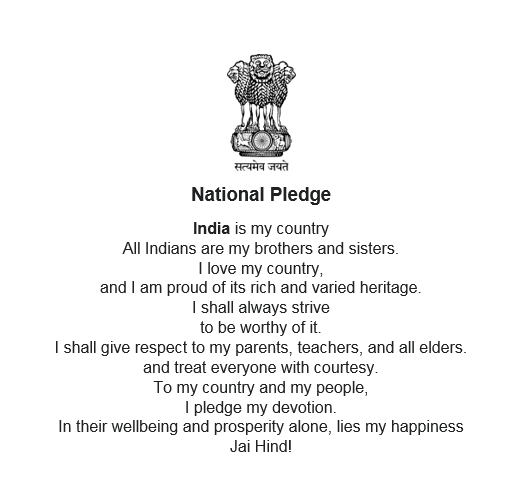
"National Pledge of India"

The Indian National Pledge was composed by Pydimarri Venkata Subba Rao. Subbarao, a noted author in Telugu and a bureaucrat, composed the pledge while serving as the District Treasury Officer of Visakhapatnam District in 1962. He presented it to the senior Congress leader Tenneti Viswanadham who forwarded it to the then Education Minister P.V.G. Raju. Subba Rao was born in Anneparti, Nalgonda District, Telangana. He was an expert in Telugu, Sanskrit, English and Arabic. He worked as Treasury Officer in the state of Hyderabad. After the formation of Andhra Pradesh, he worked in Khammam, Nizamabad, Nellore, Visakhapatnam and Nalgonda Districts. The pledge was introduced in many schools in 1963.

The Indian National Pledge is commonly recited by Indians at public events, during daily assemblies in many Indian schools, and during the Independence Day and Republic Day commemoration ceremonies. Unlike the National Anthem or the National Song, whose authors are well known in India, P.V. Subba Rao, the author of the pledge remains largely a little-known figure, his name being mentioned neither in the books nor in any documents. Records with the Human Resources Development Ministry of the Government of India however record Subbarao as the author of the pledge. Subba Rao himself is thought to have been unaware of its status as the National Pledge with a position on par with the National Anthem and the National Song. Apparently, he learned of this when his granddaughter was reading the pledge from her textbook.

=== English translation ===
India is my country and all Indians are my brothers and sisters.

I love my country and I am proud of its rich and varied heritage.

I shall always strive to be worthy of it.

I shall give respect to my parents, teachers and all elders and treat everyone with courtesy.

To my country and my people, I pledge my devotion.

In their well being and prosperity alone, lies my happiness.

== Usage ==
The National Pledge has been required to be recited in schools daily since Republic Day, January 26, 1965, and is also spoken during school assemblies, on Independence Day, Republic Day, and at other traditional or lawful ceremonies.
