= Deolali (disambiguation) =

Deolali may refer to:

- Deolali, a hill station and town in Nashik district, Maharashtra, India
- Deolali Pravara, a city in Ahmednagar district, Maharashtra
- Deolali Pravara Municipal Council
- Deolali, Solapur district, a village in Solapur district, Maharashtra, India
- Deolali transit camp
- Deolali (Vidhan Sabha constituency)
