= Tippana Vijaya Simha Reddy =

Chairman of Telangana State Agro Industries Development Corporation
- In office 30 November 2022 – December 2023
- Succeeded by: Kasula Balaraju

Member of the Legislative Assembly
- In office 1989–1994
- Succeeded by: Julakanti Ranga Reddy
- Constituency: Miryalaguda

Personal details
- Born: 1948 (age 77–78) Miryalaguda, Nalgonda district, Telangana, India
- Party: Bharat Rashtra Samithi
- Other political affiliations: Indian National Congress
- Children: Tippana Keerthi Nandan Reddy
- Parent: Tippana China Krishna Reddy (father)

Tippana Vijaya Simha Reddy is an Indian politician from Telangana. He was elected as a Member of the Legislative Assembly (MLA) from the Miryalaguda constituency in 1989. On 30 November 2022, he was appointed as the Chairman of the Telangana State Agro Industries Development Corporation.

Tippana Vijaya Simha Reddy meeting MLC Kalvakuntla Kavitha after being appointed as Chairman of Telangana State Agro Industries Development Corporation

== Early life and education ==
Tippana Vijaya Simha Reddy was born in 1948 in Miryalaguda, Nalgonda district, Telangana. His father, Tippana China Krishna Reddy, was a former MLA of Miryalaguda. Vijaya Simha Reddy completed his Intermediate education in Nalgonda and graduated with a BSc degree from Hyderabad City College in 1972.

== Political career ==
Tippana Vijaya Simha Reddy entered politics through the Congress Party and served in various positions within the party. In the 1989 Andhra Pradesh Legislative Assembly election, he contested as a Congress candidate and was elected to the Assembly for the first time, defeating CPM candidate A. Lakshminarayana Reddy by a margin of 5,453 votes. In the 1994 elections, he contested again but was defeated by CPM candidate Julakanti Ranga Reddy by a margin of 20,093 votes.

He later joined the Telangana Rashtra Samithi (TRS) party and served as its president for the undivided Nalgonda district. He contested the 2004 Assembly elections on behalf of the TRS party but was unsuccessful. From 2012 to 2015, he served as the Chairman of the Miryalaguda Market Committee. In 2019, he was elected as a ZPTC member from Miryalaguda representing TRS. On 30 November 2022, Chief Secretary Somesh Kumar issued orders on the instructions of Chief Minister K. Chandrashekar Rao appointing him as the Chairman of the Telangana State Agro Industries Development Corporation.
