= Kadthal =

- Village
- Location in Telangana, India Kadthal (India)
- Coordinates: 16.985875°N 78.501420°E
- Country: India
- State: Telangana
- District: Ranga Reddy

Population
  - Total: 10,581

Languages
  - Official: Telugu
- Time zone: UTC+5:30 (IST)
- PIN: 509358
- Telephone code: 08543
- Vehicle registration: TG 07
- Nearest city: Hyderabad, India
- Climate: hot (Köppen)

Kadthal is a village in Ranga Reddy district of the Indian state of Telangana. It is located in Kadthal mandal of Kandukur revenue division.

Maheswara Maha Pyramid, Kadthal Main Rd and Maisigandi Maisamma Temple, Kadthal are popular attractions located close to Kadthal town.

The upcoming Hyderabad Pharma City is near Kadthal town.

The villages in Kadthal mandal include:

1. Chellampally (Takuraju Guda, Vampu Guda, Jonnala Rasi, Balaji Nagar) 2. Maisigandi 3. Salarpoor 4. Maktta Madaram 5. Karkalpahad 6. Govinda Pally 7. Vasdevupur 8. Raviched
