= Maisamma =

Hindu deity

Maisamma, Mesai
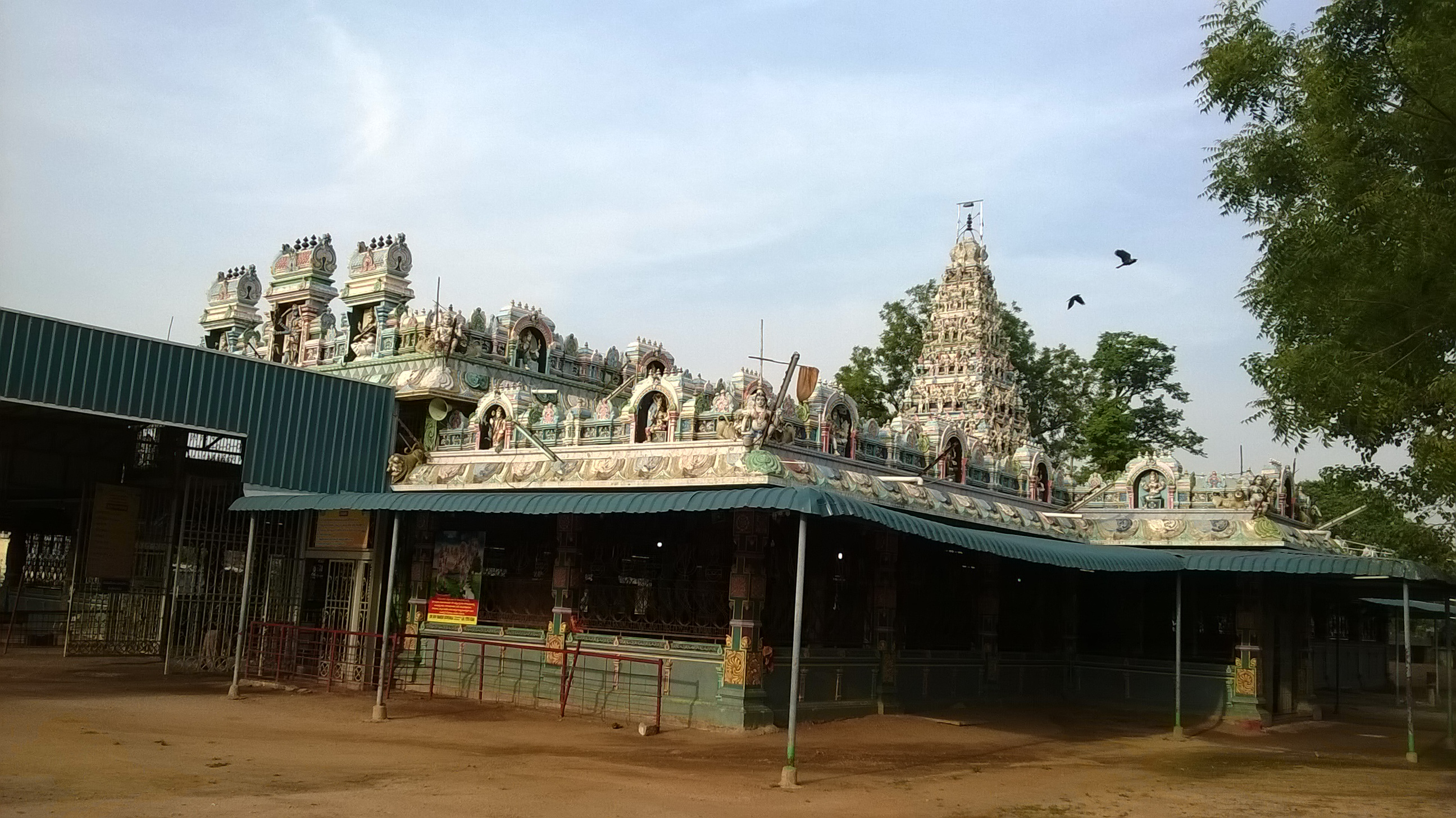
- Goddess Maisamma
- Devanagari: मेसाई
- Telugu: మైసమ్మ

Maisamma (Telugu: మైసమ్మ), also known as Mesai (Marathi: मेसाई) and additionally spelt Mesko (Marathi: मेस्को), Amma in Telugu or Aai in Marathi (Telugu: అమ్మ Marathi: आई, "mother") is a Hindu folk goddess. She is mainly worshipped as a South Indian mother goddess, predominantly in the rural areas of Telangana, Karnataka and Maharashtra.

In Shamirpet in Telangana, Maisamma is worshipped as the goddess protecting village boundaries.

== Names and characteristics ==
She is believed to be the daughter of Shiva and Parvati. As per the place she is worshipped, she is called in different names:

1. Katta Maisamma (who protects water and ensures that the tank is full)
2. Nalla Maisamma (who is in black color and worshipped under a tree)
3. Tella Maisamma (who is white and worshipped in a small tomb like structure or wall)
4. Bangaaru Maisamma (who is in golden complexion and safe guards the town/village)
5. Vendi Maisamma (who is worshipped in outskirts of the village and wears silver)
6. Panta Maisamma (who is worshipped in the agricultural lands, she doesn't has any idols, she is worshipped before and after the crop harvest)

== See also ==
- Katta Maisamma temple
- Maisigandi Maisamma Temple, Kadthal
- Gandhari Maisamma Jatra
- Mariamman
