= Hyderabad–Amaravati Greenfield Expressway =

Proposed expressway in India

Route information
- Maintained by NHAI
- Length: 298 km (185 mi)
- Status: Proposed / Under Survey

Major junctions
- West end: Mucherla (Future City), Hyderabad
- East end: Amaravati / Machilipatnam

Location
- Country: India
- States: Telangana, Andhra Pradesh

Highway system
- Roads in India; Expressways; National; State; Asian

The Hyderabad–Amaravati Greenfield Expressway is a proposed 298-kilometre-long (185 mi), six-lane, access-controlled highway connecting the capital cities of Telangana and Andhra Pradesh. The project is designed as a "straight-line" greenfield corridor to reduce travel time between the two cities to approximately 2.5 hours.

The expressway originates near Tippareddypalli in Mucherla (Future City) and follows a new alignment that bypasses the congested NH-65. It passes through the following districts:

- Telangana (118 km): Ranga Reddy district, Nalgonda district (passing through the Miryalaguda region), and Suryapet district.
- Andhra Pradesh (180 km): Palnadu district (Sattenapalli), Guntur district, Amaravati, and extends to Machilipatnam (Bandar Port).

A semi-high-speed rail corridor is planned to run parallel to the expressway, aiming to reduce travel time between Hyderabad and Amaravati to 1.5 hours. Following a request from the Telangana government, the South Central Railway (SCR) revised the alignment to follow this greenfield path. This shift officially identifies Miryalaguda as a key station on the route, replacing the previous alignment that passed further north through Suryapet.

As of early 2026, the National Highways Authority of India (NHAI) is finalizing the detailed project report. The central government has committed to funding the project, estimated at ₹25,000 crore, which includes total land acquisition costs.
