= Mirkhanpet =

Coordinates: 17°03′N 78°35′E

Mirkhanpet Meerkhanpet
- Village
- Interactive map of Mirkhanpet
- Country: India
- State: Telangana State

Government
  - Type: State
  - Body: Telangana

Telugu, Urdu Languages
  - Official: Telugu
- Time zone: UTC+5:30 (IST)
- Postal code: 501509
- Telephone code: 040
- Vehicle registration: TS07 X XXXX

Meerkhanpet is a village in Ranga Reddy district in the Indian state of Telangana. It falls under Kandukur mandal. This village is situated in between Srishailam Highway and Nagarjuna Sagar Highway. Telangana state government officials announced that the Green Pharmacity, Central Powergrid Corporation, and State Electric Substation had lain the foundations for the city. Meerkhanpet currently consists of functioning facilities including banks and ATMs, which are used by villagers on a daily basis.
