= Swachha Andhra Corporation =

Waste management corporation in India

Public Sector Undertaking overview
- Formed: 2015
- Jurisdiction: Andhra Pradesh, India
- Headquarters: Vijayawada
- Public Sector Undertaking executive: Kommareddy Pattabhi Ram, (Chairman)
- Parent department: Government of Andhra Pradesh
- Website: sac.ap.gov.in

Swachh Andhra Corporation is an organization set up by the government of Andhra Pradesh. Its main job is to make the state cleaner and manage waste like trash and garbage.

== History ==
The Swachh Andhra Corporation was created by the Andhra Pradesh government in 2015 to help with the Swachh Andhra Mission.

=== Leadership ===
Gandham Chandrudu, a senior IAS officer, serves as the managing director of the Swachh Andhra Corporation and is in charge of improving cleanliness and sanitation in the state.

== Impact ==
Corporation contributed to the cleanliness of cities in Andhra Pradesh. In the Swachh Survekshan 2020 rankings, three cities from the state—Vijayawada, Visakhapatnam, and Tirupati—were listed among the top 10 cleanest cities in India.

In an effort to improve sanitation and public health, over 200,000 toilets have been constructed in urban areas and 37.76 lakh toilets in rural communities.

The corporation backed a local event in Vijayawada known as the Indian Swachhta League 2.0. About 3,000 young folks took part to make the city cleaner. At this event, workers got rid of a lot of trash from the city's waterways.

Corporation has set an ambitious goal to distribute two crore dustbins in villages throughout the state. This initiative aims to enhance waste collection and promote cleaner living conditions in rural areas. By providing these dustbins, the corporation hopes to make it easier for residents to dispose of waste responsibly.

== See also ==
Swachh Bharat Mission
