= Hyderabad Pharma City =

- Pharmaceuticals industrial park
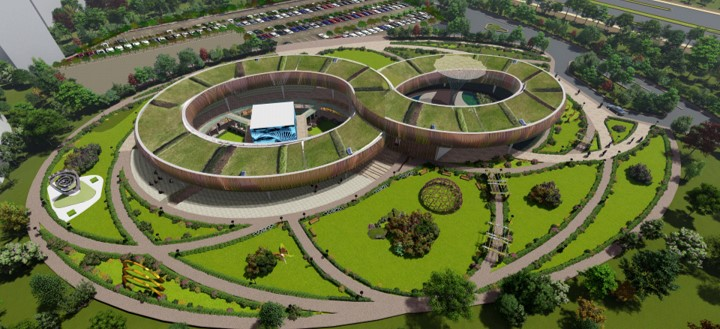
- An image of the proposed park

- Location in Telangana, India
- Country: India
- State: Telangana
- District: Ranga Reddy
- Founder: K. T. Rama Rao

Area
  - Total: 77 km^{2} (30 sq mi)

Languages
- Time zone: UTC+5:30 (IST)

Hyderabad Pharma City, is a large pharmaceuticals industrial park being established Mucherla near Hyderabad, India by the Government of Telangana. Spread over 19,000-acre (77 km^{2}), the Park is touted to be biggest of its kind industrial cluster for the pharmaceuticals for pharmaceutical companies in manufacturing and development needs.

Telangana Government has embarked on this project. It is expected to attract US$9.7 billion Investment and generate employment to 560,000 people.

It is a controversial project because of the potential impact on the surrounding environment that has already been polluted by the existing pharmaceutical factories in Hyderabad.

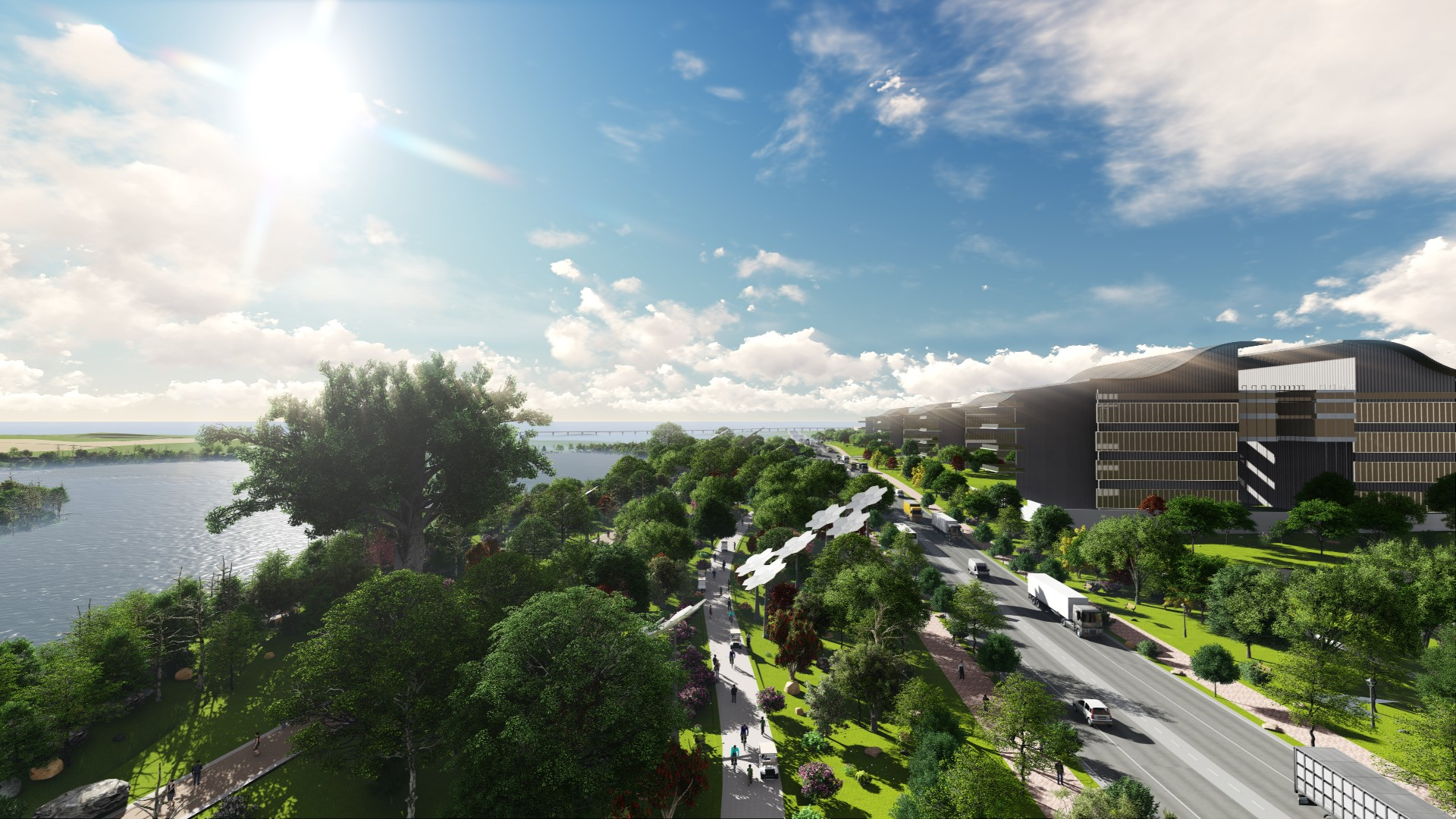

== History ==
The Park is an initiative of the IT and Industries Minister, Government of Telangana, K. T. Rama Rao. It was announced on 24 March 2018. Hyderabad, the capital of Telangana State and has been an industrial capital and major economic hub. Pharmaceuticals is one of the major industries in and around Hyderabad in addition to Information Technology. Contributing to more than 40% of the bulk drug production in the country, Hyderabad has been named as "Bulk Drug Capital of India" and "Vaccine Capital of the World".

In December 2019 the Government of India granted National Investment Manufacturing Zone (NIMZ) status to the project (NIMZ) status to the project and has recognized the project as a Project of National Importance. A Special Purpose Vehicle "Hyderabad Pharma City Ltd" has been set up to implement the project.

== Location ==
The Park is coming up in Mucherla near Hyderabad.

The proposed Hyderabad Pharma City is situated in Kandukur, yacharam and kadthal Mandals of Ranga Reddy District in the State of Telangana. Project site is located around Mucherla Village, Kadthal Village, Ranga Reddy District at a distance of approximately 25 km from Hyderabad Outer Ring Road (ORR) and ~ 29 km from Hyderabad International Airport.

== Companies presence ==
The companies that committed to have presence are Biocon, Dr. Reddy's Laboratories, Novartis.

GoTS announced that the project will be operationalized in 2020. A total of 350 companies had approached the government seeking land in Pharma City, and 150 of them will be allotted land in phase I.

== See also ==
- Genome Valley
- Financial District, Hyderabad
