= Julakanti =

Julakanti (Telugu: జూలకంటి) is a Telugu surname. Notable people with the surname include:

- Julakanti Brahmananda Reddy (born 1964), Indian politician
- Julakanti Ranga Reddy (born 1958), Indian politician
