= Swachh Survekshan =

Indian sanitation survey

Swachh Survekshan (SS)
- Owner: Quality Council of India
- Country: India
- Prime Minister(s): Narendra Modi
- Ministry: Ministry of Housing and Urban Affairs
- Launched: May 2016; 10 years ago

Swachh Survekshan (SS; lit. 'Cleanliness Survey' from Sanskrit) is an annual survey of cleanliness, hygiene and sanitation in villages, cities and towns across India. It was launched as part of the Swachh Bharat Mission, which aimed to make India clean and free of open defecation by 2 October 2019. The first survey was undertaken in 2016 and covered 73 cities (53 cities with a population of over a million, and all state capitals); by 2020 the survey had grown to cover 4242 cities and was said to be the largest cleanliness survey in the world. The surveys are carried out by Quality Council of India.

== Survey methodology ==
The survey is carried out by the Quality Council of India, which in 2020 covered 4242 cities and towns, It include 5 Lakhs+ ULB Document Evidence captured, 24 Lakhs+ Geotagged Photos captured from field and feedback from 1.9 crore people.

Survey in 2020 was weighted on 6000 points. The criteria and weightages for different components of sanitation related aspects used for the survey were:

a) Service Level Progress-1300 marks

b) Citizen feedback – 1500 marks

c) Direct observation – 1500 marks

d) GFC (SWM) 1,000 Marks; ODF /ODF+ / ODF++ 500 Marks

e) Average ranking of Quarterly Assessments (April 2019 to June 2019, July 2019 to Sep 2019, Oct 2019 to Dec 2019)-200 Marks

== Highlights ==
=== In the 2020 survey ===
- Indore, in Madhya Pradesh, is India's cleanest city.
- Surat, in Gujarat, Ranked second cleanest city of India and was followed by Maharashtra's Navi Mumbai.
- Varanasi was adjudged the ‘best Ganga town’ in the central government's cleanliness survey.
- A total of 1.9 crore citizens across 4,242 cities of the country participated in the survey held by the Ministry of Housing and Urban Affairs.
- The survey focused on collection segregated waste and maintenance till processing site, treatment and reuse of wastewater, curtailing solid waste-based air pollution, among other factors.
Location of Top 3 cleanest Indian Cities.

=== In the 2019 survey ===
7 of the top 10 cities in the survey had populations less than 10 lakhs

=== In the 2017 survey ===
- Indore, in Madhya Pradesh, was India's cleanest city and Gonda, in Uttar Pradesh, was the filthiest
- Of 10 cleanest cities, two were are from Madhya Pradesh, Gujarat and Andhra Pradesh each, while Karnataka, Tamil Nadu, Delhi and Maharashtra each had one
- Out of 10 dirtiest cities, Uttar Pradesh had five cities, two each were from Bihar and Punjab, and one from Maharashtra
- 118 out of 500 cities were found to be Open Defecation Free
- 297 cities had 100% door to door collection of garbage
- 37 lakh citizens showed interest in Swachh Surveksan
- There were 404 cities in which at least 75% of residential areas were found substantially clean
- Gujarat had 12 cities among the top 50 cleanest, followed by Madhya Pradesh with 11 and Andhra Pradesh with eight
- Four of the dirtiest cities were in Uttar Pradesh and 50 of the state's towns were ranked 305 and below

== Pre-evaluation results ==
=== Kota city ===
The experts from the Swachh Sarvekshan survey awarded a score of 525 out of 6000 to the municipal corporation of Kota. Kota, a city in Rajasthan known for its IIT and medical coaching centers, has faced serious criticism from the Swachhta Mission. The city is situated on the banks of the Chambal River and is home to six government universities: Rajasthan Technical University, the Indian Institute of Information Technology (IIIT), the University of Kota, Agriculture University, Vardhman Mahaveer Open University, and another Agriculture University. None of these institutions have initiated any research projects to address the endangered situation and disruptions. Every day, tons of garbage and chemical waste are disposed of directly into the Chambal River. The National Brand Ambassador of Swachh Bharat Mission D. P. Sharma evaluated the status of the city after the latest evaluation and also criticized the city's Municipal Corporation for its Swachhta management. According to Dr. DP Sharma's evaluation, the city scored 545 marks out of a 6000-point scale. Dainik Bhaskar, a regional newspaper, also covered the issue and assessed the cleanliness of the city. The next day, more than 49 NGOs and social activists mobilized public and private institutions, as well as individuals, to take an oath to keep the city neat and clean. A local career center in the city has created a separate cleanliness brigade to support the Swachhta mission and clean the city's roads and crematoriums.

== Survey results ==
According to the 2020 survey, Swachh Survekshan Results 2020: Indore in Madhya Pradesh retained its position as the cleanest city in India for the fourth consecutive year, according to the Swachh Survekshan 2020 survey results.

While Gujarat's Surat bagged the second spot, Maharashtra's Navi Mumbai ranked third. Varanasi was adjudged the ‘best Ganga town’ in the central government's cleanliness survey.

Latest Results from annual city surveys (Swachh Sarveskshana surveys)
	2024	2020	2019	2018	2017	2016
Number of cities surveyed or ranked		4242	4237	4203	434	73
Duration of survey					4 January 2017 and 7 February 2017	
Sources of data						
Cleanest ten cities	1. Indore; 2. Surat; 3. Navi Mumbai; 4. Vijayawada	More than 10 Lakh Population: 1. Indore; 2. Surat; 3. Navi Mumbai; 4. Vijayawada; 5. Ahmedabad; 6. Rajkot; 7. Bhopal; 8. Chandigarh; 9. Vishakhapatnam(GVMC); 10. Vadodara	1. Indore; 2. Ambikapur; 3. Mysuru; 4. Ujjain; 5. New Delhi (NDMC); 6. Ahmedabad; 7. Navi Mumbai; 8. Tirupati; 9. Rajkot; 10. Dewas	1. Indore; 2. Bhopal; 3. Chandigarh; 4. New Delhi (NDMC); 5. Vijayawada; 6. Tirupati; 7. Visakhapatnam(GVMC); 8. Mysore; 9. Navi Mumbai; 10. Pune	1. Indore; 2. Bhopal; 3. Vishakhapatnam; 4. Surat; 5. Mysore; 6. Tiruchirapalli; 7. New Delhi Municipal Council; 8. Navi Mumbai; 9. Tirupati; 10. Vadodara; 11. Coimbatore	1. Indore (Madhya Pradesh); 2. Tiruchirappalli (Tamil Nadu); 3. Chandigarh; 4. New Delhi; 5. Visakhapatnam (Andhra Pradesh); 6. Surat (Gujarat); 7. Rajkot (Gujarat); 8. Gangtok (Sikkim); 9. Pimpri-Chinchwad (Maharashtra); 10. Greater Mumbai (Maharashtra)
Ten least clean cities (at the bottom of the list)						64. Kalyan Dombivili (Maharashtra); 65. Varanasi (Uttar Pradesh); 66. Jamshedpur (Jharkhand); 67. Ghaziabad (Uttar Pradesh); 68. Raipur (Chhattisgarh); 69. Meerut (Uttar Pradesh); 70. Patna (Bihar); 71. Itanagar (Arunachal Pradesh); 72. Asansol (West Bengal); 73. Dhanbad (Jharkhand)

== 2024 ==
=== Swachh Sarvekshan 2024-2025 ===
'Super Swachh League Cities' (by population)
Million Plus Cities (>10 Lakh)	Indore, Surat, Navi Mumbai, Vijayawada
Big Cities (3-10 Lakh)	Noida, Chandigarh, Mysore, Ujjain, Gandhinagar, Guntur
Medium Cities (50,000 – 3 Lakh)	New Delhi (NDMC), Tirupati, Ambikapur, Lonavala
Small Cities (20,000 – 50,000)	Vita, Saswad, Deolali Pravara, Dungarpur
Very Small Cites (<20,000)	Panchgani, Patan, Panhala, Bishrampur, Bundi

'Swachh Shehar Award Cities' (by population)
>10 Lakh:	Ahmedabad, Bhopal, Lucknow
3-10 Lakh:	Mira-Bhayandar, Bilaspur, Jamshedpur
50,000 - 3 Lakh:	Dewas, Karnal, Karad
20,000 – 50,000:	Panaji, Aska, Kumhari
< 20,000:	Bilha, Chikiti, Shahganj

Source: SWACHH SURVEKSHAN

Rest of Cities - Rankings (excludes 'Super Swachh League Cities'):
City	State	Total Score (12,500)	SS 2024 (10,000)	Garbage Free City (1,300)	ODF (1,200)
Ahmedabad	GUJARAT	12,079	9,579	1,300	1,200
Bhopal	MADHYA PRADESH	12,067	9,567	1,300	1,200
Lucknow (M. Corp)	UTTAR PRADESH	12,001	9,501	1,300	1,200
Raipur	Chhattisgarh	11,996	9,496	1,300	1,200
Jabalpur	MADHYA PRADESH	11,989	9,489	1,300	1,200
Hyderabad (GHMC)	TELANGANA	11,805	9,350	1,300	1,200
Pimpri-Chinchwad	Maharashtra	11,782	9,302	1,300	1,200
Panaji	GOA	11,694	9,254	1,300	1,200
DEWAS	MADHYA PRADESH	11,692	9,457	1,100	1,200
PUNE	Maharashtra	11,653	9,393	1,100	1,200
Mira-Bhayandar	Maharashtra	11,652	9,352	1,100	1,200
Visakhapatnam	ANDHRA PRADESH	11,636	9,336	1,100	1,200
BILASPUR	Chhattisgarh	11,624	9,354	1,100	1,200
JAMSHEDPUR	JHARKHAND	11,588	9,323	1,100	1,200
AGRA (M. Corp)	UTTAR PRADESH	11,532	9,232	1,100	1,200
GHAZIABAD (M. Corp)	UTTAR PRADESH	11,514	9,254	1,100	1,200
Prayagraj (M. Corp)	UTTAR PRADESH	11,292	9,017	1,100	1,200
GORAKHPUR (M. Corp)	UTTAR PRADESH	11,278	9,108	1,100	1,200
AHMEDANAGAR	Maharashtra	11,136	9,196	800	1,200
PANVEL	Maharashtra	11,119	9,249	800	1,200
KARHAD	Maharashtra	11,088	9,148	800	1,200
BHILAI NAGAR	Chhattisgarh	11,055	9,160	800	1,200
KANPUR (M. Corp)	UTTAR PRADESH	11,022	8,802	1,100	1,200
GWALIOR	MADHYA PRADESH	10,995	9,060	800	1,200
KARNAL	HARYANA	10,992	9,067	800	1,200
SINGRAULI	MADHYA PRADESH	10,972	9,092	800	1,200
REWA	MADHYA PRADESH	10,931	8,906	1,100	1,000
SEHORE	MADHYA PRADESH	10,917	8,972	800	1,200
THANE	Maharashtra	10,836	8,956	800	1,200
JAIPUR GREATER (MC)	Rajasthan	10,793	8,923	800	1,200
KHURAI	MADHYA PRADESH	10,773	9,003	800	1,000
KATNI	MADHYA PRADESH	10,746	9,046	800	1,000
VARANASI (M. Corp)	UTTAR PRADESH	10,728	8,778	800	1,200
ASIKA (NAC)	ODISHA	10,722	9,067	800	1,000
PITHAMPUR	MADHYA PRADESH	10,714	8,994	800	1,000
VADODARA	GUJARAT	10,713	8,888	800	1,200
SAGAR	MADHYA PRADESH	10,702	8,837	800	1,200
BILHA (NP)	Chhattisgarh	10,685	8,965	800	1,000
SECUNDERABAD CANTT.	Telangana	10,680	8,835	800	1,200
SATNA	MADHYA PRADESH	10,671	8,716	1,100	1,000
RAJKOT	GUJARAT	10,634	8,844	800	1,200
JAIPUR HERITAGE (MC)	RAJASTHAN	10,630	8,925	800	1,000
BARAMATI	Maharashtra	10,623	8,918	800	1,200
PATNA	BIHAR	10,584	8,659	800	1,200
KORBA	Chhattisgarh	10,564	8,719	800	1,200
Rajnandgaon	Chhattisgarh	10,553	8,968	800	1,000
Bhubaneswar	ODISHA	10,548	8,608	800	1,200
Moradabad (M. Corp)	UTTAR PRADESH	10,541	8,666	800	1,200
Mathura (Mathura Vrindavan MC)	UTTAR PRADESH	10,527	8,702	800	1,200
CHIKITI (NAC)	ODISHA	10,524	8,859	800	1,000
SHAHGANJ	MADHYA PRADESH	10,508	8,983	500	1,200
Firozabad (M.CORP.)	UTTAR PRADESH	10,502	8,647	800	1,200
BALRAMPUR (NP)	Chhattisgarh	10,491	8,826	800	1,000
UDAIPUR (M CL)	RAJASTHAN	10,478	8,503	800	1,200
JAGDALPUR	Chhattisgarh	10,446	8,841	800	1,000
BHAVNAGAR	GUJARAT	10,416	8,691	800	1,200
Rourkela (M)	ODISHA	10,396	8,701	800	1,000
KUMHARI	Chhattisgarh	10,367	8,662	800	1,000
REHLI	MADHYA PRADESH	10,357	8,692	800	1,000
INDAPUR	Maharashtra	10,355	8,725	800	1,000
SAHARANPUR (M. Corp)	UTTAR PRADESH	10,338	8,758	500	1,200
PRATAPPUR (NP)	Chhattisgarh	10,335	8,705	800	1,000
RAJPUR (NP)	Chhattisgarh	10,308	8,728	800	1,000
NEEMUCH	MADHYA PRADESH	10,297	8,757	500	1,200
DATIA	MADHYA PRADESH	10,296	8,786	500	1,200
MANASA	MADHYA PRADESH	10,289	8,599	800	1,000
CHHATARPUR	MADHYA PRADESH	10,276	8,591	800	1,000
BHILAI CHARODA (M)	Chhattisgarh	10,271	8,841	500	1,000
VAPI	GUJARAT	10,265	8,430	800	1,200
DANTEWADA (NP)	Chhattisgarh	10,263	8,888	500	1,000
GHARGHODA (NP)	Chhattisgarh	10,259	8,614	800	1,000
DEOLALI CANTT	Maharashtra	10,255	8,300	800	1,200
SANGAMNER	Maharashtra	10,253	8,533	800	1,000
KHATEGAON	MADHYA PRADESH	10,252	8,632	800	1,000
NAGRI_M	MADHYA PRADESH	10,242	8,902	500	1,000
CHHURA (NP)	Chhattisgarh	10,220	8,510	800	1,000
KAWARDHA (M)	Chhattisgarh	10,207	8,867	500	1,000
NAYAGAON	MADHYA PRADESH	10,196	8,816	500	1,000
MHOW CANTT	MADHYA PRADESH	10,195	8,530	800	1,000
DURG	Chhattisgarh	10,167	8,872	500	1,000
DORNAPAL (NP)	Chhattisgarh	10,167	8,802	500	1,000
JHANSI (M. Corp)	UTTAR PRADESH	10,159	8,509	800	1,000
CHHINDWARA	MADHYA PRADESH	10,151	8,536	800	1,000
KUNKURI(NP)	Chhattisgarh	10,144	8,829	500	1,000
HOSHANGABAD	MADHYA PRADESH	10,141	8,456	800	1,000
MUNGELI (M)	Chhattisgarh	10,139	8,794	500	1,000
SIDDHI	MADHYA PRADESH	10,127	8,477	800	1,000
NASHIK	Maharashtra	10,125	8,270	800	1,200
ASHOKNAGAR	MADHYA PRADESH	10,122	8,567	800	1,000
KANJARI	GUJARAT	10,118	8,553	500	1,200
JASHPUR NAGAR (M)	Chhattisgarh	10,110	8,780	500	1,000
HINJILICUT (NAC)	ODISHA	10,109	8,489	800	1,000
KAGAL	Maharashtra	10,104	8,469	800	1,000
VENGURLA	Maharashtra	10,094	8,774	500	1,000
SIMGA (NP)	Chhattisgarh	10,093	8,763	500	1,000
KANNOD	MADHYA PRADESH	10,092	8,737	500	1,000
ANUPSHAHR (NPP)	UTTAR PRADESH	10,082	8,747	500	1,000
BIJNOR (NPP)	UTTAR PRADESH	10,081	8,491	500	1,200
KHAJURAO	MADHYA PRADESH	10,080	8,700	500	1,000
AGAR	MADHYA PRADESH	10,075	8,755	500	1,000
ITARSI	MADHYA PRADESH	10,070	8,690	500	1,000
RAMANUJGANJ (NP)	Chhattisgarh	10,070	8,715	500	1,000
SITAMAU	MADHYA PRADESH	10,069	8,729	500	1,000
SILLOD	Maharashtra	10,066	8,321	800	1,000
RATLAM	MADHYA PRADESH	10,063	8,688	500	1,200
BADE BACHELI (M)	Chhattisgarh	10,059	8,789	500	1,000
UTAI (NP)	Chhattisgarh	10,057	8,772	500	1,000
ICHALKARANJI	Maharashtra	10,055	8,440	500	1,200
MODINAGAR (NPP)	UTTAR PRADESH	10,047	8,627	500	1,000
BARSUR (NP)	Chhattisgarh	10,044	8,664	500	1,000
AMRAVATI	Maharashtra	10,036	8,621	500	1,200
HIMMATNAGAR	GUJARAT	10,029	8,514	500	1,200
BUTIBORI (NP)	Maharashtra	10,025	8,610	500	1,000
SANWER	MADHYA PRADESH	10,018	8,748	500	1,000
RAJAHMUNDRY	ANDHRA PRADESH	10,017	8,402	800	1,000
PALARI (NP)	Chhattisgarh	10,013	8,653	500	1,000
ABHANPUR (NP)	Chhattisgarh	10,006	8,691	500	1,000
ARANGÂ (NP)	Chhattisgarh	10,005	8,665	500	1,000
MURGUD	Maharashtra	10,001	8,586	500	1,000
BURHANPUR	MADHYA PRADESH	9,998	8,153	800	1,200
SENDHWA	MADHYA PRADESH	9,997	8,427	800	1,000
SANTRAMPUR	GUJARAT	9,991	8,491	500	1,200
SONIPAT	HARYANA	9,987	8,182	800	1,200
PASAN	MADHYA PRADESH	9,986	8,511	800	1,000
GEEDAM (NP)	Chhattisgarh	9,986	8,571	500	1,000
BHATGAON_S (NP)	Chhattisgarh	9,982	8,622	500	1,000
PATHALGAON (NP)	Chhattisgarh	9,975	8,665	500	1,000
MANA-CAMP (NP)	Chhattisgarh	9,968	8,573	500	1,000
MANSA_G	GUJARAT	9,965	8,510	500	1,200
SHIVRINARAYAN	Chhattisgarh	9,965	8,470	800	1,000
PANIPAT (M CL)	HARYANA	9,959	8,489	500	1,200
SHIRUR	Maharashtra	9,955	8,465	500	1,200
DONGARGAON (NP)	Chhattisgarh	9,955	8,625	500	1,000
SHEGAON	Maharashtra	9,947	8,437	500	1,200
KHARORA (NP)	Chhattisgarh	9,944	8,614	500	1,000
KOTMA	MADHYA PRADESH	9,942	8,612	500	1,000
SHAHPUR_S	MADHYA PRADESH	9,939	8,584	500	1,000
SIDHAULI (NP)	UTTAR PRADESH	9,938	8,693	500	1,000
NARSINGHGARH	MADHYA PRADESH	9,937	8,562	500	1,000
SHAHPUR_B	MADHYA PRADESH	9,934	8,649	500	1,000
NAGARI (NP)	Chhattisgarh	9,932	8,602	500	1,000
DOUNDI (NP)	Chhattisgarh	9,926	8,636	500	1,000
NAVSARI	GUJARAT	9,923	8,483	500	1,200
BHAKHARA (NP)	Chhattisgarh	9,919	8,609	500	1,000
DHAMNOD_R	MADHYA PRADESH	9,915	8,620	500	1,000
BERLA (NP)	Chhattisgarh	9,914	8,574	500	1,000
BAREILLY (M. Corp)	UTTAR PRADESH	9,913	8,433	500	1,200
NAYA BARADWAR (NP)	Chhattisgarh	9,909	8,539	500	1,000
DAHOD	GUJARAT	9,899	8,429	500	1,200
SIRONJ	MADHYA PRADESH	9,898	8,608	500	1,000
GARHAKOTA	MADHYA PRADESH	9,893	8,588	500	1,000
ATHANA	MADHYA PRADESH	9,892	8,572	500	1,000
DAHI	MADHYA PRADESH	9,889	8,309	800	1,000
BASTAR (NP)	Chhattisgarh	9,888	8,168	800	1,000
ANTAGARH (NP)	Chhattisgarh	9,887	8,597	500	1,000
NARSINGI	TELANGANA	9,884	8,614	500	1,000
BALAGHAT	MADHYA PRADESH	9,880	8,500	500	1,000
CHANDRAPUR_M	Maharashtra	9,878	8,288	800	1,000
DHAR	MADHYA PRADESH	9,877	8,372	800	1,000
DEESA	GUJARAT	9,876	8,826	-	1,200
KHILCHIPUR	MADHYA PRADESH	9,872	8,537	500	1,000
VIDISHA	MADHYA PRADESH	9,871	8,311	500	1,200
SUTHALIA	MADHYA PRADESH	9,866	8,531	500	1,000
RADHOGARH	MADHYA PRADESH	9,864	8,309	800	1,000
RAHURI	Maharashtra	9,860	8,250	800	1,000
MALHAR (NP)	Chhattisgarh	9,858	8,608	500	1,000
NAWAGARH_JC (NP)	Chhattisgarh	9,851	8,461	500	1,000
BAGICHA (NP)	Chhattisgarh	9,845	8,545	500	1,000
MAHABALESHWAR	Maharashtra	9,843	8,513	800	1,200
PIPLODHA	MADHYA PRADESH	9,843	8,578	500	1,000
NAGPUR	Maharashtra	9,836	8,281	500	1,200
KHARGONE	MADHYA PRADESH	9,832	8,322	500	1,200
LALKUAN	UTTARAKHAND	9,828	8,553	500	1,000
RISALI (NN)	Chhattisgarh	9,827	8,467	500	1,000
BATHINDA	PUNJAB	9,824	8,529	500	1,200
GUNDERDEHI (NP)	Chhattisgarh	9,824	8,524	500	1,000
WARANGAL	TELANGANA	9,821	8,511	500	1,000
KIRANDUL (M)	Chhattisgarh	9,814	8,539	500	1,000
SAWANTWADI	Maharashtra	9,813	8,438	500	1,000
SOLAPUR	Maharashtra	9,812	8,102	800	1,000
Shendurjana Ghat	Maharashtra	9,811	8,506	500	1,000
SARGAON (NP)	Chhattisgarh	9,809	8,419	500	1,000
KUKDESHWAR	MADHYA PRADESH	9,807	8,452	500	1,000
DHANPURI	MADHYA PRADESH	9,805	8,300	800	1,000
BARAMKELA (NP)	Chhattisgarh	9,800	8,460	500	1,000
HINGANA	Maharashtra	9,800	8,400	500	1,000
BADKUHI	MADHYA PRADESH	9,798	8,488	500	1,000
Mhowgaon	MADHYA PRADESH	9,795	8,495	500	1,000
Ankleshwar	GUJARAT	9,792	8,382	500	1,000
BASNA (NP)	Chhattisgarh	9,792	8,477	500	1,000
TUMGAON (NP)	Chhattisgarh	9,792	8,242	800	1,000
GUNA	MADHYA PRADESH	9,788	8,418	500	1,000
KOTBA (NP)	Chhattisgarh	9,788	8,418	500	1,000
DEVKAR (NP)	Chhattisgarh	9,784	8,519	500	1,000
KHARSIA (M)	Chhattisgarh	9,779	8,414	500	1,000
LODHIKHEDA	MADHYA PRADESH	9,777	8,572	500	1,000
MUNGAOLI	MADHYA PRADESH	9,776	8,496	500	1,000
Malkapur, Karad	Maharashtra	9,774	8,579	500	1,000
SINGOLI	Madhya Pradesh	9,771	8,496	500	1,000
HARDOI (NPP)	Uttar Pradesh	9,769	8,404	500	1,000
BODLA (NP)	Chhattisgarh	9,769	8,579	500	1,000
KHANDWA	Madhya Pradesh	9,766	8,456	500	1,000
RAIGARH	Chhattisgarh	9,765	8,490	500	1,000
MANJHOLI_J	Madhya Pradesh	9,763	8,578	500	1,000
Bilaigarh (NP)	Chhattisgarh	9,751	8,451	500	1,000
NARAYANPUR (NP)	Chhattisgarh	9,745	8,480	500	1,000
SHYAMGARH	MADHYA PRADESH	9,743	8,468	500	1,000
MEERUT	UTTAR PRADESH	9,741	8,231	500	1,200
SARAIPALI (NP)	Chhattisgarh	9,741	8,491	500	1,000
RAU	MADHYA PRADESH	9,739	8,434	500	1,000
NANDURBAR	Maharashtra	9,734	8,159	500	1,200
SATARA	Maharashtra	9,734	8,379	500	1,000
CHHUIKHADAN (NP)	Chhattisgarh	9,725	8,415	500	1,000
GANJBASODA	MADHYA PRADESH	9,720	8,390	500	1,000
KOTHRI	MADHYA PRADESH	9,719	8,504	500	1,000
SAHASPUR-LOHARA (NP)	Chhattisgarh	9,718	8,148	800	1,000
AHMEDABAD CANTT	GUJARAT	9,717	7,882	800	1,200
GAUTAMPURA	Madhya Pradesh	9,714	8,349	500	1,000
JEERAN	Madhya Pradesh	9,711	8,466	500	1,000
GADARWARA	Madhya Pradesh	9,710	8,445	500	1,000
BAMHANI	Madhya Pradesh	9,707	8,487	500	1,000
MAGARLOD (NP)	Chhattisgarh	9,705	8,340	500	1,000
DABHRA (NP)	Chhattisgarh	9,704	8,389	500	1,000
SELU	Maharashtra	9,704	8,054	800	1,000
CHIRMIRI	Chhattisgarh	9,703	8,358	500	1,000
DESAIGANJ	Maharashtra	9,702	8,372	500	1,000
NASRULLAGANJ	Madhya Pradesh	9,701	8,446	500	1,000
AAMADI (NP)	Chhattisgarh	9,695	8,350	500	1,000
MANENDRAGARH	Chhattisgarh	9,691	8,366	500	1,000
KHAMHARIYA	Chhattisgarh	9,691	8,281	500	1,000
GOBINDGARH	PUNJAB	9,689	7,879	800	1,200
NAINPUR	MADHYA PRADESH	9,689	8,314	800	1,000
PANNA	MADHYA PRADESH	9,687	8,357	500	1,000
YEOLA	Maharashtra	9,682	8,087	800	1,000
DAHIWADI	Maharashtra	9,674	8,359	500	1,000
URAN ISLAMPUR	Maharashtra	9,670	8,295	500	1,000
GARIYABAND (NP)	Chhattisgarh	9,665	8,385	500	1,000
DATTAPUR DHAMANGAON	Maharashtra	9,663	8,398	500	1,000
VANKHEDI	Madhya Pradesh	9,662	8,447	500	1,000
NANDED WAGHALA	Maharashtra	9,659	8,149	500	1,200
BARSHI	Maharashtra	9,655	8,575	500	1,000
KURA (NP)	Chhattisgarh	9,653	8,423	500	1,000
CHORAI	MADHYA PRADESH	9,651	8,426	500	1,000
SAINKHEDA	MADHYA PRADESH	9,641	8,316	500	1,200
MANDSAUR	MADHYA PRADESH	9,638	8,293	500	1,000
DHAMDHA (NP)	Chhattisgarh	9,631	8,266	500	1,000
BODRI (NP)	Chhattisgarh	9,631	8,741	-	1,000
NAGDA	MADHYA PRADESH	9,623	8,338	500	1,000
KIRODIMALNAGAR (NP)	Chhattisgarh	9,618	8,358	500	1,000
BETUL	MADHYA PRADESH	9,615	8,340	500	1,000
CHHURIYA (NP)	Chhattisgarh	9,612	8,382	500	1,000
CHICHOLI	MADHYA PRADESH	9,611	8,411	500	1,000
PITHORA (NP)	Chhattisgarh	9,605	8,335	500	1,000
RATANGARH_N_M	MADHYA PRADESH	9,602	8,372	500	1,000
RUDRAPUR	Uttarakhand	9,596	8,241	500	1,000
KASAI DODAMARG	Maharashtra	9,586	8,151	500	1,000
TEOSA	Maharashtra	9,586	8,381	500	1,000
CHANDRAPUR (NP)	Chhattisgarh	9,584	8,179	800	1,000
INDERGARH_MP	MADHYA PRADESH	9,582	8,117	800	1,000
DIPKA (M)	Chhattisgarh	9,582	8,772	-	1,000
NARAYANGARH	MADHYA PRADESH	9,576	8,461	500	1,000
SHAHDOL	MADHYA PRADESH	9,569	8,424	500	1,000
FATEHABAD	HARYANA	9,566	8,541	-	1,200
GOBRA NAWAPARA (M)	Chhattisgarh	9,556	8,741	-	1,000
ROHTAK	HARYANA	9,550	8,065	500	1,200
PANAGAR	MADHYA PRADESH	9,545	8,460	500	1,000
SEONDHA	MADHYA PRADESH	9,545	8,695	-	1,000
KAALOL	GUJARAT	9,543	8,278	500	1,000
SOHAGPUR	MADHYA PRADESH	9,532	8,282	500	1,000
KHIRKIYA	MADHYA PRADESH	9,527	8,292	500	1,000
NAWROZABAD	MADHYA PRADESH	9,527	8,322	500	1,000
DHAMTARI (M)	Chhattisgarh	9,523	8,068	800	1,000
MATTANNUR (M)	KERALA	9,522	8,447	500	750
KHACHROD	MADHYA PRADESH	9,522	8,172	500	1,000
HATTA	MADHYA PRADESH	9,517	8,247	500	1,000
BALOD (M)	Chhattisgarh	9,501	8,346	500	1,000
BHANPURA	MADHYA PRADESH	9,501	8,226	500	1,000
DAMUA	MADHYA PRADESH	9,498	8,283	500	1,000
SAMBHAL (NPP)	UTTAR PRADESH	9,494	8,174	500	1,000
UMRED	Maharashtra	9,492	8,242	500	1,000
MAHASAMUND (M)	Chhattisgarh	9,479	8,289	500	1,000
PEERZADIGUDA	TELANGANA	9,478	8,538	-	1,000
HALOL	GUJARAT	9,469	8,124	500	1,000
BHABHAR	GUJARAT	9,466	8,526	-	1,000
DAKOR	GUJARAT	9,466	8,166	500	1,000
PIPARIYA_M	MADHYA PRADESH	9,466	8,121	500	1,000
OBEDULLAGANJ	MADHYA PRADESH	9,461	8,626	-	1,000
SANAWAD	MADHYA PRADESH	9,451	8,236	500	1,000
JUNAGADH	GUJARAT	9,449	8,209	500	1,200
KESHOD	GUJARAT	9,441	8,081	500	1,200
BARDOLI	GUJARAT	9,440	8,160	500	1,200
AMROHA (NPP)	UTTAR PRADESH	9,437	8,097	500	1,000
Kalyan-Dombivli	Maharashtra	9,436	8,046	500	1,000
BINA ETAWA	MADHYA PRADESH	9,433	8,138	500	1,000
BADNAGAR	MADHYA PRADESH	9,433	8,263	500	1,000
Alappuzha (M)	KERALA	9,428	8,053	800	750
IDAR	GUJARAT	9,425	8,095	500	1,000
SARNI	MADHYA PRADESH	9,415	8,140	500	1,000
Guruvayur (M)	KERALA	9,412	8,212	500	1,000
KHERAGARH (NP)	UTTAR PRADESH	9,412	8,322	500	750
ZIRA	PUNJAB	9,397	8,112	500	1,000
SEONI MALWA	MADHYA PRADESH	9,397	8,352	500	1,000
Aurangabad	Maharashtra	9,395	7,805	500	1,200
Umariya	MADHYA PRADESH	9,388	8,328	500	1,000
Wanadongri	Maharashtra	9,385	8,500	-	1,000
Ghatanji	Maharashtra	9,384	8,124	500	1,000
GAYA	BIHAR	9,381	7,881	800	1,000
ALIGARH (M. Corp)	UTTAR PRADESH	9,378	8,118	500	1,000
Malegaon	Maharashtra	9,368	8,133	500	1,000
DASUA (M CL)	PUNJAB	9,364	8,369	-	1,200
KONDAGAON (M)	Chhattisgarh	9,357	8,527	-	1,000
GORMI	MADHYA PRADESH	9,352	7,777	800	1,000
TIKAMGARH	MADHYA PRADESH	9,350	8,215	500	1,000
SATANA	Maharashtra	9,348	8,018	500	1,000
KORTULLA (M)	TELANGANA	9,347	8,067	500	1,000
KARELI	MADHYA PRADESH	9,342	8,062	500	1,000
JUNNARDEO	MADHYA PRADESH	9,325	8,235	500	1,000
JAMUL (M)	Chhattisgarh	9,325	7,760	800	1,000
RAHATGARH	MADHYA PRADESH	9,324	7,929	500	1,000
SANAUR	PUNJAB	9,321	8,146	500	1,000
RAJAPUR (NP)	UTTAR PRADESH	9,320	7,990	500	1,000
HARDA	MADHYA PRADESH	9,300	8,005	500	1,000
AYODHYA (M.CORP.)	UTTAR PRADESH	9,291	8,146	800	1,000
HARIJ	GUJARAT	9,282	8,447	-	1,000
KANKER	Chhattisgarh	9,272	8,122	500	1,000
CHHARRA RAFATPUR (NP)	UTTAR PRADESH	9,268	8,148	500	750
DADRI (NPP)	UTTAR PRADESH	9,259	8,019	500	1,000
AMLA	MADHYA PRADESH	9,257	8,472	-	1,000
DONGAR PARASIYA	MADHYA PRADESH	9,255	8,125	500	1,000
CHIPLUN	Maharashtra	9,253	7,968	500	1,000
MAU	Madhya Pradesh	9,251	8,066	500	1,000
BADNAWAR	Madhya Pradesh	9,246	8,061	500	1,000
JAMNAGAR	GUJARAT	9,241	7,816	500	1,200
SHIRDI	Maharashtra	9,241	7,736	500	1,200
PANDHURNA	MADHYA PRADESH	9,241	8,476	-	1,000
Khedbrahma	GUJARAT	9,231	8,181	-	1,200
Namakkal	TAMIL NADU	9,225	8,110	500	1,000
Rasipuram	TAMIL NADU	9,219	7,799	800	1,000
CHACHODABINAGANJ	MADHYA PRADESH	9,218	8,063	500	1,000
KADODARA	GUJARAT	9,207	8,032	500	1,000
JHALOD	GUJARAT	9,203	8,388	-	1,000
BARWAHA	MADHYA PRADESH	9,202	8,432	-	1,000
MANAVAR	MADHYA PRADESH	9,199	8,039	800	1,000
PURI (M)	ODISHA	9,197	8,062	500	1,200
Bulandshahr (NPP)	UTTAR PRADESH	9,194	8,374	-	1,000
SIHORA	MADHYA PRADESH	9,189	8,099	500	1,000
UNJHA	GUJARAT	9,181	8,401	-	1,000
CUTTACK	ODISHA	9,156	7,641	500	1,200
Aruppukkottai	TAMIL NADU	9,153	7,638	800	1,000
ALIRAJPUR	MADHYA PRADESH	9,151	7,731	800	1,000
Gangaghat (NPP)	UTTAR PRADESH	9,142	8,372	-	1,000
SIKAR (M CL)	RAJASTHAN	9,137	7,692	500	1,200
Patan	GUJARAT	9,135	8,335	-	1,000
Kadapa	ANDHRA PRADESH	9,133	7,883	500	1,000
Davanagere	KARNATAKA	9,131	7,806	500	1,000
RATNAGIRI	Maharashtra	9,129	7,889	500	1,000
GONDAL	GUJARAT	9,100	8,155	-	1,200
Port Blair (M CL)	Andaman and Nicobar Islands	9,096	7,766	800	1,000
PORBANDAR	GUJARAT	9,084	8,224	-	1,200
Shahjahanpur (M.CO RP.)	UTTAR PRADESH	9,059	7,759	500	1,000
HUBLI-DHARWAD	KARNATAKA	9,035	7,480	500	1,200
LATUR	Maharashtra	8,940	7,535	500	1,000
MUZAFFARNAGAR (NPP)	UTTAR PRADESH	8,927	7,772	500	1,000
NELLORE	ANDHRA PRADESH	8,891	8,131	-	1,000
KAKINADA	ANDHRA PRADESH	8,842	8,097	-	1,000
DHULE	Maharashtra	8,809	8,139	-	1,000
SANGLI	Maharashtra	8,750	7,465	500	1,200
GURGAON	HARYANA	8,664	7,824	-	1,200
JAMMU	Jammu and Kashmir	8,655	7,225	800	1,000
ULHASNAGAR	Maharashtra	8,632	7,812	-	1,000
GUWAHATI	ASSAM	8,563	7,848	500	750
KURNOOL	ANDHRA PRADESH	8,506	7,956	-	1,000
Coimbatore	TAMIL NADU	8,347	7,587	-	1,000
VASAI VIRAR	Maharashtra	8,295	7,455	-	1,000
RAMPUR (NPP)	UTTAR PRADESH	8,274	7,739	-	1,000
YAMUNANAGAR (M CL)	HARYANA	8,267	7,647	-	1,000
BIKANER	RAJASTHAN	8,255	7,430	-	1,000
Tiruchirappalli	TAMIL NADU	8,239	7,629	-	1,000
KOCHI	KERALA	8,181	7,236	500	1,000
AMRITSAR	PUNJAB	8,173	7,183	-	1,200
MALEGAON	Maharashtra	8,024	7,294	-	1,000
JALGAON	Maharashtra	7,999	7,334	-	1,000
BHILWARA (M CL)	RAJASTHAN	7,988	7,233	-	1,000
ALWAR (M CL)	RAJASTHAN	7,935	7,155	-	1,000
Uzhavarkarai	Puducherry	7,932	7,317	-	1,000
DELHI	DELHI	7,920	7,080	500	1,200
JODHPUR NORTH (MC)	RAJASTHAN	7,919	7,189	-	1,000
Kalaburagi (M CORP. + OG)	KARNATAKA	7,823	7,203	-	1,000
THRISSUR	KERALA	7,815	7,280	500	750
HISAR	HARYANA	7,798	7,048	-	1,200
LONI (NPP)	UTTAR PRADESH	7,756	7,241	-	1,000
Thoothukudi	TAMIL NADU	7,743	7,138	-	1,000
DEHRADUN	Uttarakhand	7,614	6,994	-	1,000
JODHPUR SOUTH (MC)	RAJASTHAN	7,571	6,951	-	1,000
BHAGALPUR	BIHAR	7,550	6,700	500	750
SRINAGAR	JAMMU AND KASHMIR	7,488	6,918	-	750
Parbhani	Maharashtra	7,470	6,950	-	1,000
Kolhapur	Maharashtra	7,454	6,494	-	1,200
Mumbai	Maharashtra	7,419	6,894	-	750
Faridabad	HARYANA	7,329	6,989	-	1,000
Bhiwandi	Maharashtra	7,232	6,852	-	1,000
Kota ((North) M Corp)	RAJASTHAN	7,208	6,408	-	1,000
Dhanbad	JHARKHAND	7,196	6,986	-	750
Ajmer	RAJASTHAN	7,142	6,497	-	1,000
Kozhikode	KERALA	7,101	6,716	-	750
Akola	Maharashtra	7,058	6,263	-	1,000
Belgaum (M CORP. + OG)	KARNATAKA	7,053	6,468	-	750
Ballari	KARNATAKA	6,943	6,118	-	1,000
Kota ((South) M Corp)	RAJASTHAN	6,931	6,196	-	1,000
Brahmapur (M Corp)	ODISHA	6,911	6,851	-	1,000
Patiala	PUNJAB	6,907	6,532	-	1,200
Tiruppur	TAMIL NADU	6,865	6,390	-	1,000
Bruhat Bengaluru Mahanagara Palike	KARNATAKA	6,842	6,247	-	1,200
Ranchi	JHARKHAND	6,835	6,490	-	750
Chennai	TAMIL NADU	6,822	6,327	-	1,200
Muzaffarpur	BIHAR	6,698	6,283	-	750
Nizamabad	TELANGANA	6,684	6,724	-	500
Bihar Sharif	BIHAR	6,675	6,050	-	750
Shimoga (CMC)	KARNATAKA	6,666	6,201	-	1,000
Jalandhar	PUNJAB	6,525	5,800	-	1,200
Bijapur	KARNATAKA	6,524	6,264	-	500
Tambaram	TAMIL NADU	6,417	6,267	-	1,000
Vellore	TAMIL NADU	6,395	5,775	-	1,000
Mangaluru	KARNATAKA	6,315	6,285	-	500
Avadi	TAMIL NADU	6,297	6,162	-	1,000
Agartala	TRIPURA	6,292	5,542	-	1,000
Thiruvananthapuram	KERALA	5,871	5,991	-	1,200
Tirunelveli	TAMIL NADU	5,869	5,809	-	1,000
Salem	TAMIL NADU	5,633	5,518	-	1,000
Tumkur	KARNATAKA	5,590	4,840	-	1,000
Kollam	Kerala	5,376	6,121	-	500
Ludhiana	Punjab	5,272	5,542	-	750
Erode	Tamil Nadu	4,911	4,511	-	1,200
Madurai	Tamil Nadu	4,823	4,643	-	1,000
Mathura (Cantt.)	Uttar Pradesh	3,452	3,572	-	-

=== Garbage Free City Star Ratings 2024 ===
7 Stars:

(Door to Door Collection: >=90%, Waste Processing: >=90%)

State	District	ULB Name	Star Rating
ANDHRA PRADESH	NTR	VIJAYAWADA	7
CHHATTISGARH	RAIPUR	RAIPUR	7
GOA	NORTH GOA	PANAJI	7
GUJARAT	AHMEDABAD	AHMEDABAD	7
GUJARAT	SURAT	SURAT	7
MADHYA PRADESH	BHOPAL	BHOPAL	7
MADHYA PRADESH	INDORE	INDORE	7
MADHYA PRADESH	JABALPUR	JABALPUR	7
MAHARASHTRA	PUNE	PIMPRI CHINCHWAD	7
MAHARASHTRA	THANE	NAVI MUMBAI	7
TELANGANA	HYDERABAD	GREATER HYDERABAD	7
UTTAR PRADESH	LUCKNOW	LUCKNOW (M. Corp)	7

5 Stars:

(Door to Door Collection: >=90%, Waste Processing: >=80%)

State	District	ULB Name	Star Rating
ANDHRA PRADESH	GUNTUR	GUNTUR	5
ANDHRA PRADESH	TIRUPATI	TIRUPATI	5
ANDHRA PRADESH	VISAKHAPATNAM	GVMC VISAKHAPATNAM	5
CHHATTISGARH	BILASPUR	BILASPUR	5
CHHATTISGARH	DURG	PATAN (NP)	5
CHHATTISGARH	SARGUJA	AMBIKAPUR	5
DELHI	NEW DELHI	NEW DELHI (NDMC)	5
JHARKHAND	EAST SINGHBUM	JAMSHEDPUR	5
KARNATAKA	MYSORE	MYSORE	5
MADHYA PRADESH	DEWAS	DEWAS	5
MADHYA PRADESH	REWA	REWA	5
MADHYA PRADESH	SATNA	SATNA	5
MAHARASHTRA	PUNE	LONAVALA	5
MAHARASHTRA	PUNE	PUNE	5
MAHARASHTRA	SANGLI	VITA	5
MAHARASHTRA	THANE	MIRA-BHAYANDAR	5
UTTAR PRADESH	AGRA	AGRA (M. Corp)	5
UTTAR PRADESH	GAUTAM BUDDHA NAGAR	NOIDA	5
UTTAR PRADESH	GHAZIABAD	GHAZIABAD (M. Corp)	5
UTTAR PRADESH	GORAKHPUR	GORAKHPUR (M. Corp)	5
UTTAR PRADESH	KANPUR NAGAR	KANPUR (M. Corp)	5
UTTAR PRADESH	PRAYAGRAJ	PRAYAGRAJ (M. Corp)	5

3 stars:

(Door to Door Collection: >=90%, Waste Processing: >=70%)

State	District	ULB Name	Star Rating
Andaman and Nicobar Islands	South Andaman	Port Blair (M CL)	3
Andhra Pradesh	East Godavari	Rajamahendravaram	3
Bihar	Gaya	Gaya	3
Bihar	PATNA	Patna	3
Chandigarh	Chandigarh	Chandigarh	3
Chhattisgarh	BALRAMPUR	Balrampur (NP)	3
Chhattisgarh	BALRAMPUR	RAJPUR (NP)	3
Chhattisgarh	BASTAR	BASTAR (NP)	3
Chhattisgarh	BASTAR	JAGDALPUR	3
Chhattisgarh	BILASPUR	BILHA (NP)	3
Chhattisgarh	DHAMTARI	DHAMTARI (M)	3
Chhattisgarh	DURG	Bhilai	3
Chhattisgarh	DURG	JAMUL (M)	3
Chhattisgarh	DURG	Kumhari	3
Chhattisgarh	Gariaband	CHHURA (NP)	3
Chhattisgarh	Janjgir–Champa	Shivrinarayan	3
Chhattisgarh	KABIRDHAM	Sahaspur - Lohara (NP)	3
Chhattisgarh	KORBA	KORBA	3
Chhattisgarh	Mahasamund	TUMGAON (NP)	3
Chhattisgarh	Raigarh	GHARGHODA (NP)	3
Chhattisgarh	Rajnandgaon	RAJNANDGAON	3
Chhattisgarh	SAKTI	CHANDRAPUR (NP)	3
Chhattisgarh	SURAJPUR	PRATAPPUR (NP)	3
Gujarat	Ahmedabad	Ahmedabad Cantonment	3
Gujarat	Bhavnagar	Bhavnagar	3
Gujarat	Gandhinagar	Gandhinagar	3
Gujarat	RAJKOT	RAJKOT	3
Gujarat	VADODARA	VADODARA	3
Gujarat	VALSAD	Vapi	3
Haryana	KARNAL	KARNAL	3
Haryana	SONIPAT	SONIPAT	3
Jammu and Kashmir	JAMMU	JAMMU	3
Kerala	Alappuzha	ALAPPUZHA (M)	3
Kerala	Palakkad	Pattambi	3
Kerala	Palakkad	SHORANUR (M)	3
Madhya Pradesh	Alirajpur	ALIRAJPUR	3
Madhya Pradesh	Anuppur	PASAN	3
Madhya Pradesh	Ashoknagar	ASHOKNAGAR	3
Madhya Pradesh	BARWANI	SENDHWA	3
Madhya Pradesh	BHIND	GORMI	3
Madhya Pradesh	Burhanpur	BURHANPUR	3
Madhya Pradesh	Chhatarpur	CHHATARPUR	3
Madhya Pradesh	Chhindwara	CHHINDWARA	3
Madhya Pradesh	DATIA	Indergarh	3
Madhya Pradesh	DEWAS	Hatpipliya	3
Madhya Pradesh	DEWAS	KHATEGAON	3
Madhya Pradesh	DEWAS	PIPALRAWAN	3
Madhya Pradesh	DHAR	DAHI	3
Madhya Pradesh	DHAR	DHAR	3
Madhya Pradesh	DHAR	MANAVAR	3
Madhya Pradesh	DHAR	Pithampur	3
Madhya Pradesh	GUNA	Raghogarh-Vijaypur	3
Madhya Pradesh	GWALIOR	GWALIOR	3
Madhya Pradesh	Hoshangabad	Hoshangabad	3
Madhya Pradesh	INDORE	Mhow	3
Madhya Pradesh	JHABUA	JHABUA	3
Madhya Pradesh	MANDLA	NAINPUR	3
Madhya Pradesh	Katni	KATNI	3
Madhya Pradesh	NEEMUCH	MANASA	3
Madhya Pradesh	Rajgarh	PACHORE	3
Madhya Pradesh	SAGAR	KHURAI	3
Madhya Pradesh	SAGAR	REHLI	3
Madhya Pradesh	SAGAR	SAGAR	3
Madhya Pradesh	Sehore	BUDNI	3
Madhya Pradesh	Sehore	SEHORE	3
Madhya Pradesh	SEONI	Lakhnadon	3
Madhya Pradesh	SHAHDOL	DHANPURI	3
Madhya Pradesh	SIDHI	SIDDHI	3
Madhya Pradesh	SINGRAULI	Singrauli	3
Madhya Pradesh	UJJAIN	UJJAIN	3
Madhya Pradesh	UJJAIN	UNHEL	3
Maharashtra	Ahmednagar	Ahmednagar	3
Maharashtra	Ahmednagar	Deolali Pravara	3
Maharashtra	Ahmednagar	Rahuri	3
Maharashtra	Ahmednagar	Sangamner	3
Maharashtra	Aurangabad	Sillod	3
Maharashtra	Chandrapur	Chandrapur	3
Maharashtra	JALGAON	Pachora	3
Maharashtra	KOLHAPUR	Kagal	3
Maharashtra	KOLHAPUR	Vadgaon	3
Maharashtra	NAGPUR	Kamptee	3
Maharashtra	NASHIK	Deolali Cantt.	3
Maharashtra	NASHIK	Nashik	3
Maharashtra	NASHIK	Yeola	3
Maharashtra	PUNE	Baramati	3
Maharashtra	PUNE	Indapur	3
Maharashtra	PUNE	Saswad	3
Maharashtra	Raigad	Panvel	3
Maharashtra	SATARA	Karad	3
Maharashtra	SATARA	Mahabaleshwar	3
Maharashtra	SATARA	Panchgani	3
Maharashtra	SOLAPUR	Solapur	3
Maharashtra	THANE	Thane	3
Maharashtra	WARDHA	Seloo	3
Manipur	JIRIBAM	JIRIBAM	3
Odisha	GANJAM	ASIKA (NAC)	3
Odisha	GANJAM	Bhanjanagar (NAC)	3
Odisha	GANJAM	CHIKITI (NAC)	3
Odisha	GANJAM	Digapahandi (NAC)	3
Odisha	GANJAM	GOPALPUR (NAC)	3
Odisha	GANJAM	Hinjilikatu (NAC)	3
Odisha	GANJAM	SURADA (NAC)	3
Odisha	KHURDA	BHUBANESWAR	3
Odisha	PURI	PIPILI (NAC)	3
Odisha	Sundergarh	Rourkela (M)	3
Odisha	Sundergarh	Sundergarh (M)	3
Punjab	Fatehgarh Sahib	GOBINDGARH	3
Rajasthan	DHAULPUR	RAJAKHERA (M)	3
Rajasthan	JAIPUR	JAIPUR (MC)	3
Rajasthan	JAIPUR	JAIPUR HERITAGE (MC)	3
Rajasthan	UDAIPUR	UDAIPUR (M CL)	3
Tamil Nadu	Kanchipuram	Kanchipuram	3
Tamil Nadu	Namakkal	Rasipuram	3
Tamil Nadu	Thanjavur	Thiruvidaimarudur	3
Tamil Nadu	Theni	Chinnamanur	3
Tamil Nadu	Tiruppur	Dharapuram	3
Tamil Nadu	Tiruppur	Vellakoil	3
Tamil Nadu	Virudhunagar	Aruppukkottai	3
Telangana	Hyderabad	Secunderabad Cantt.	3
Uttar Pradesh	Ayodhya	Ayodhya (M.CORP.)	3
Uttar Pradesh	Firozabad	FIROZABAD (M.CORP.)	3
Uttar Pradesh	Jhansi	JHANSI (M. Corp)	3
Uttar Pradesh	Mathura	Mathura Vrindavan (MC)	3
Uttar Pradesh	Moradabad	MORADABAD (M. Corp)	3
Uttar Pradesh	Varanasi	VARANASI (M. Corp)	3

1 star:

(Door to Door Collection: >=80%, Waste Processing: >=50%)

View the list of 792, 1 start cities here: Swachh Bharat Mission - Gfc Result 2024-25

0 stars:

All other cities are likely in the 0 star rating, as they did not meet the 1 start qualifications. This includes cities like Chennai.

== 2021 ==
Swachh Survekshan 2021 Rankings by city
Swachh Survekshan Rank	City	State/Union Territory
1	Indore	Madhya Pradesh
2	Surat	Gujarat
3	Vijayawada	Andhra Pradesh
4	Navi Mumbai	Maharashtra
5	New Delhi	New Delhi
6	Ambikapur	Chhattisgarh
7	Tirupati	Andhra Pradesh
8	Pune	Maharashtra
9	Noida	Uttar Pradesh
10	Ujjain	Madhya Pradesh
Source: Ministry of Housing and Urban Affairs.

== 2020 ==
Swachh Survekshan 2020 Rankings by city
Swachh Survekshan Rank	City	State/Union Territory
1	Indore	Madhya Pradesh
2	Surat	Gujarat
3	Navi Mumbai	Maharashtra
4	Ambikapur	Chhattisgarh
5	Mysore	Karnataka
6	Vijayawada	Andhra Pradesh
7	Ahmedabad	Gujarat
8	New Delhi (NDMC)	Delhi
9	Chandrapur	Maharashtra
10	Khargone	Madhya Pradesh
Source: Ministry of Housing and Urban Affairs.
