= Bathula Laxma Reddy =

Indian politician

Bathula Laxma Reddy (born 4 May 1969) is an Indian politician from Telangana state. He is an MLA from Miryalaguda Assembly constituency in Nalgonda district. He represents Indian National Congress party and won the 2023 Telangana Legislative Assembly election.

== Early life and education ==
Reddy is born in Miryalaguda, Nalgonda district to Bathula Eswar Reddy and Venkatamma. He completed his diploma in diesel mechanics in 1986 at Asian ITI college. He is a businessman and runs his own transport business.

== Career ==
Reddy joined Congress party in 2004 as a cadre and grew up the ladder. He won as MLA for the first time from Miryalaguda Assembly constituency representing Indian National Congress in the 2023 Telangana Legislative Assembly election. He polled 114,462 votes and defeated his nearest rival, Nallamothu Bhaskar Rao of Bharat Rashtra Samithi, by a huge margin of 48, 782 votes.
