= Deolali Pravara Municipal Council =

Deolali Pravara Municipal Council is a municipal council that governs Deolali Pravara a town in Rahuri taluka of Ahmednagar district, Maharashtra, an Indian state. The council is a "C" class council and comprises 18 wards.

== Awards ==
The council has won various awards including the following:

- 2002-03: Rs. 25 lakh first prize for cleanliness amongst "C" class municipalities of Maharashtra.
- 2003-04: Rs. 5 lakh prize for solid waste management.
- 2004-05: Rs. 5 lakh prize for water supply and sanitation
- 2007: National level prize - first prize of value Rs. 1 lakh and citation for best ground water conservation in Western region.
