= Thungapahad =

Thungapahad is a village in Miryalaguda, Nalgonda, Telangana, India.The population is approximately 6,719. The village has two canals, three rice mills and one cotton factory, there is also a high school, several primary schools and a library.

One of the canals in Thungapahad is called Bondham, it flows 365 days a year and is a major resource for the paddy fields and the cotton industry although it is completely polluted with chemicals from that industry. Recently, a new bridge was constructed.

The main occupation for the village people is agriculture.

There are three temples in Thungapahad. Ramalayam is at the centre point of the village, Venugopala Swamy Temple, which was renovated four years ago, is at the starting point to the village and Kanaka Durga Temple is at the other end of the village. There are also four churches in Thungapahad.
