= Nallamothu Bhaskar Rao =

Indian politician

MLA
- In office 2 June 2014 – 2023
- Preceded by: Julakanti Ranga Reddy
- Succeeded by: Bathula Laxma Reddy
- Constituency: Miryalaguda, Telangana

Personal details
- Born: 18 March 1953 (age 73) Mudigonda, Warangal, Telangana.
- Party: Telangana Rashtra Samithi (TRS)

Nallamothu Bhaskar Rao (born 18 March 1953) is an Indian politician representing the Miryalaguda constituency, Telangana. Though he won as a Congress candidate in 2014, and he again won as a TRS candidate in 2018. He is a native of Shakapuram village, Nidamanoor Mandal of Nalgonda District.

== Early life ==
Nallamothu Bhaskar Rao was born to Nallamothu Venkata Ramaiah and Lakshmi Kanthamma. He completed the Bachelor of Science at SR & BGNR College, Khammam.

== Telangana Movement ==
He was an active participant in the first-ever Telangana Movement in 1969 as General Secretary of Students Union, SR & BGNR College. He faced about 16 legal cases while he participated in the movement and was legally confined to stay at Nelakondapalli village jurisdiction for six months. He worked as a member in Osmania University Students Union along with Sri Mallikarjun.

== Political career ==
- Former Chairman – Agricultural Market Committee Nidamamoor, Nalgonda Dist.
- He has been a close associate of Kunduru Jana Reddy for 35 years and played a key role in Reddy's electoral victories from 1983.
- He also played crucial role from 1989 onwards in both Miryalaguda and Nalgonda Parliament Elections for the electoral victories of B.N. Reddy, S. Jaipal Reddy and G. Sukender Reddy.
- He also spearheaded local elections (municipal and Panchayat Raj) and played an important part in winning the Miryalaguda Municipal Council elections since 2005. In the 2014 municipal elections, his party won 33 out of 36 wards, which is a record in the combined Telugu states.
- In 2014, he was elected as Member of Legislative Assembly (MLA) of Miryalaguda constituency in the newly formed state of Telangana.
- In 2018, he was re-elected as MLA of Miryalaguda Constituency.
- In 2019, he played a crucial role in winning Huzurnagar constituency by his party candidate.
- In 2019, he ensured winning 91 out of 119 village panchayat elections along with Mandal Parishad leaders.
- In 2020, he ensured winning Miryalaguda Municipality. His team has been winning Municipal elections since 2005.

== Philanthropic work ==
- All through his life, he has been promoting education by providing financial aid to deserving students for higher studies such as medical and engineering (IIT, BITS). He also provides financial and moral support to people who need medical care.
- Since 2015, several philanthropic activities like summer free water booths in the town, blood donation camps, etc. are undertaken through the NBR foundation in the Miryalaguda constituency.
- Under the NBR Foundation, several job melas are conducted. One of the melas paved way for securing 650 jobs for local unemployed youth across Hyderabad, Chennai, and Bangalore cities.
- Under the NBR foundation, free coaching and free food for almost 500 potential candidates for Police selections are done for 100 days. Around 40 of them were selected as Sub Inspectors and Constables in the state of Telangana.

== Personal life and family ==
Nallamothu Bhaskar Rao is married to Jaya and has 2 children. His elder son, Nallamothu Chaitanya, holds the office of Vice President of Engineering at Automotive Robotics Inc.(ARi). His other son, Nallamothu Siddhardha, holds the office of Vice President for a multi-national financial institution in Pune. Along with Chaitanya and Siddhardha, the whole family played very active roles in the electoral victories of Mr.Bhaskar Rao. Siddhardha is currently forefronting more regular activities in the constituency.
