= Julakanti Ranga Reddy =

Indian politician

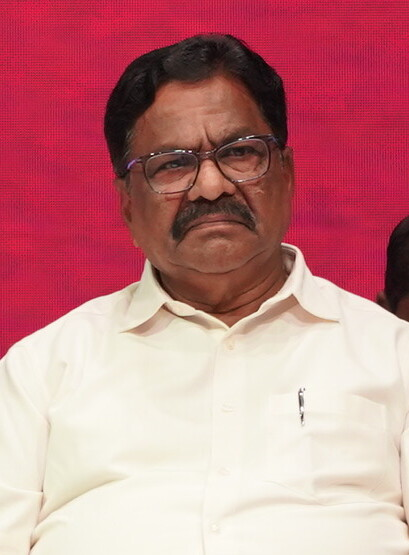

Member of Legislative Assembly, Andhra Pradesh
- In office 2004–2014
- Preceded by: Repala Srinivas
- Succeeded by: Nallamothu Bhaskar Rao
- Constituency: Miryalaguda
- In office 1994–1999
- Preceded by: Vijayasimha Reddy
- Succeeded by: Repala Srinivas
- Constituency: Miryalaguda

Personal details
- Born: 24 October 1958 (age 67) Telangana, India
- Party: Communist Party of India (Marxist)

Julakanti Ranga Reddy (born 24 October 1958) is an Indian politician and former Member of Legislative Assembly for Miryalaguda Assembly Constituency, representing the Communist Party of India (Marxist). J Ranga Reddy has won in the Andhra Pradesh State Assembly Elections 2009 for CPI(M) in Miryalaguda Constituency.

== Early life ==
Reddy was born on 24 October 1958 in Kothaguda village, Thipparthy Mandal in the Nalgonda district in the Indian state of Andhra Pradesh. He is married to J Sujatha and they have a son and a daughter.

== Political career ==
He won the Miryalaguda Assembly constituency for three terms. He is the only CPI(M) member to win in the 2009 elections and was CPM's legislative leader.

Reddy undertook an indefinite hunger strike at Nereducharla for inordinate delays in relaying the road line between Neredcherla and Janpahad. Before launching the fast, he undertook a padayatra from Mahamkaligudem to Neredcherla, covering 26 km of the bumpy road.
