= Umariya, Bhopal =

Umariya
- village
- Location within Madhya Pradesh Location within India
- Coordinates: 23.866726°N 77.248811°E
- Country: India
- State: Madhya Pradesh
- District: Bhopal
- Tehsil: Berasia

Population (2011)
  - Total: 303
- Time zone: UTC+5:30 (IST)
- ISO 3166 code: MP-IN
- Census code: 482181

Umariya is a village in the Bhopal district of Madhya Pradesh, India. It is located in the Berasia tehsil.

== Demographics ==
According to the 2011 census of India, Umariya has 71 households. The effective literacy rate (i.e. the literacy rate of population excluding children aged 6 and below) is 79.07%.

Demographics (2011 Census)
	Total	Male	Female
Population	303	170	133
Children aged below 6 years	45	24	21
Scheduled caste	96	52	44
Scheduled tribe	0	0	0
Literates	204	129	75
Workers (all)	179	104	75
Main workers (total)	96	88	8
Main workers: Cultivators	50	49	1
Main workers: Agricultural labourers	44	37	7
Main workers: Household industry workers	0	0	0
Main workers: Other	2	2	0
Marginal workers (total)	83	16	67
Marginal workers: Cultivators	51	11	40
Marginal workers: Agricultural labourers	31	4	27
Marginal workers: Household industry workers	0	0	0
Marginal workers: Others	1	1	0
Non-workers	124	66	58
