= Kandukur, Ranga Reddy district =

Kandukur
- Village
- Location in Telangana, India Kandukur (India)
- Coordinates: 17.2603°N 78.3969°E
- Country: India
- State: Telangana
- District: Ranga Reddy
- Talukas: Kandukur
- Elevation: 574 m (1,883 ft)

Languages
  - Official: Telugu
- Time zone: UTC+5:30 (IST)
- Vehicle registration: TG

Kandukur is a village in Ranga Reddy district of the Indian state of Telangana. It is located in Kandukur mandal of Kandukur revenue division.

== Geography ==
Kandukur is a suburban village and mandal headquarters located on the outskirts of Hyderabad, India. It comes under Ranga Reddy district of Telangana.

== Mandal ==
The following is the list of villages panchayats in Kandukur Mandal.

- Kothaguda
- Jaithwaram
- Pulimamidi
- Muralinagar
- Bachupally
- Nedunoor
- Manneguda
- DasarlaPally
- Mucherla
- Sarlapally
- Saireddyguda (సాయిరెడ్డిగూడ)
- Debbadaguda
- Meerkhanpet
- Begarikancha
- Akulamailaram
- Thimmaipally
- Gudur
- Kothur
- Rachuloor
- Begumpet
- Thimmapur
- Jabbarguda
- Gummadavelli
- Madhapur
- Lemoor
- Agarmiyaguda
- Saraswathigudem
