= Miryalaguda Assembly constituency =

Constituency of the Telangana legislative assembly in India

Coordinates: 16.87°N 79.56°E

Miryalaguda
- Constituency No. 88 for the Telangana Legislative Assembly
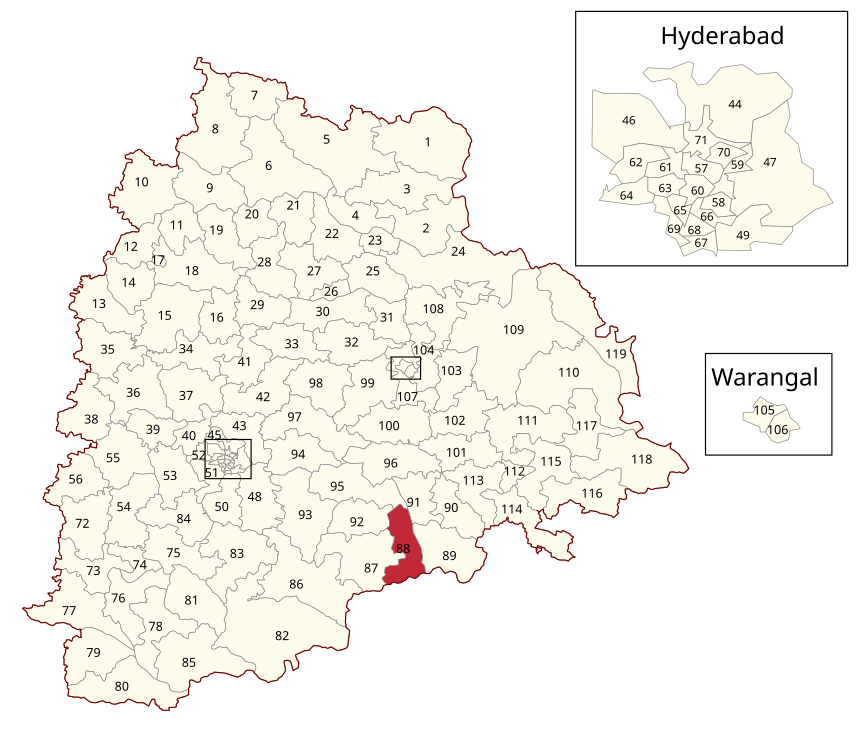
- Location of Miryalaguda Assembly constituency within Telangana

Constituency details
- Country: India
- Region: South India
- State: Telangana
- District: Nalgonda
- Lok Sabha constituency: Nalgonda
- Total electors: 2,07,157
- Reservation: None

Member of Legislative Assembly
- 3rd Telangana Legislative Assembly
- Incumbent Bathula Laxma Reddy
- Party: Indian National Congress
- Elected year: 2023

Miryalaguda Assembly constituency is a constituency of the Telangana Legislative Assembly, India. It is one of 12 constituencies in Nalgonda district. It is part of Nalgonda Lok Sabha constituency.

As of 2023, Bathula Laxma Reddy, of Indian National Congress, represents the constituency.

== Mandals ==
The Assembly Constituency presently comprises the following Mandals:

Mandal
Miryalaguda
Vemulapally
Madgulapally
Dameracherla
Adavi Devulapally

== Members of Legislative Assembly ==
Duration	Member	Political party
Andhra Pradesh
1957-62	C. Venkatareddy	People's Democratic Front
1962-67	Tippana China Krishna Reddy	Indian National Congress
1967-72	Tippana China Krishna Reddy	Indian National Congress
1972-78	Tippana China Krishna Reddy	Indian National Congress
1978-83	Aribandi Laxminarayana	Communist Party of India
1983-85	Chankilam Sreenivasa Rao	Indian National Congress
1985-89	Aribandi Laxminarayana	Communist Party of India
1989-94	Vijayasimha Reddy	Indian National Congress
1994-99	Julakanti Ranga Reddy	Communist Party of India
1999-04	Repala Srinivas	Indian National Congress
2004-09	Julakanti Ranga Reddy	Communist Party of India
2009-14	Julakanti Ranga Reddy	Communist Party of India
Telangana
2014-18	N Bhaskar Rao	Indian National Congress
2018–2023	N Bhaskar Rao	Telangana Rashtra Samithi
2023-Present	Bathula Laxma Reddy	Indian National Congress

== Election results ==
=== Telangana Legislative Assembly election, 2023 ===
Telangana Assembly Elections, 2023: Miryalaguda
Party	Candidate	Votes	%	±%
INC	Bathula Laxma Reddy	114,462	59.08	
BRS	Nallamothu Bhaskar Rao	65,680	33.90	
CPI(M)	Julakanti Ranga Reddy	3,234	1.67	
BJP	Sadineni Srinivasa Rao	3,042	1.57	
Independent	Syed Farooq	1,155	0.60	
Independent	Janardan Reddy Gundreddy	1,038	0.54	
Pyramid Party of India	Bantu Ravi	574	0.30	
Independent	Mattapally Ankulamma	553	0.29	
NOTA	None of the Above	527	0.27	
Majority		48,782	25.18	
Turnout		1,93,741		
INC gain from BRS		Swing		

=== Telangana Legislative Assembly election, 2018 ===
2018 Telangana Legislative Assembly election: Miryalaguda
Party	Candidate	Votes	%	±%
TRS	N Bhaskar Rao	83,931	47.2%	+9.3%
INC	R. Krishnaiah	53,279	30.0%	
Independent	Dheeravath Skylab nayak	13,961	7.9%	
CPI(M)	Julakanti Ranga Reddy	11,221	6.3%	
Independent	Pallapu Bikshpathi Rao	4,758	2.7%	
BJP	Karnati Prabhakar	2,502	1.4%	
Independent	Jilla Ravi	1,183	0.7%	
NOTA	None of the Above	1,171	0.65%	
Majority		30,652	17.2	
Turnout		1,78,960	85.30	
TRS gain from INC		Swing		

=== Telangana Legislative Assembly election, 2014 ===
2014 Telangana Legislative Assembly election: Miryalaguda
Party	Candidate	Votes	%	±%
INC	N Bhaskar Rao	62,059	37.57%	
TRS	Amarender Reddy	56,005	33.9%	
CPI(M)	Julakanti Ranga Reddy	22,592	13.68%	
TDP	Bantu Venkateshwarlu	20,758	12.57%	
Majority				
Turnout		6,054	3.7%	
INC gain from CPI(M)		Swing		

=== Andhra Pradesh Legislative Assembly election, 2009 ===
2009 Andhra Pradesh Legislative Assembly election: Miryalaguda
Party	Candidate	Votes	%	±%
CPI(M)	Julakanti Ranga Reddy	52,227	35.51%	
INC	Gangadhar Tirunagaru	47,864	32.55%	
PRP	Amarender Reddy	33,340	22.67%	

== See also ==
- List of constituencies of Telangana Legislative Assembly
- Miryalaguda
