= Deolali, Solapur district =

Village in Maharashtra

Deolali
- village
- Location in Maharashtra, India Deolali (India)
- Country: India
- State: Maharashtra
- District: Solapur district

Languages
  - Official: Marathi
- Time zone: UTC+5:30 (IST)

Deolali is a village in the Karmala taluka of Solapur district in Maharashtra state, India.

== Demographics ==
Covering 2,242 hectares (5,540 acres) and comprising 703 households at the time of the 2011 census of India, Deolali had a population of 3629. There were 1884 males and 1745 females, with 474 people being aged six or younger.
