= Pulimamidi =

- Village
- Location in Telangana, India Pulimamidi (India)
- Coordinates: 17.412860°N 77.992995°E
- Country: India
- State: Telangana
- District: K.V.Ranga Reddy

Population
  - Total: 2,310

Languages
  - Official: Telugu
- Time zone: UTC+5:30 (IST)
- Vehicle registration: TS
- Climate: hot (Köppen)
- Website: telangana.gov.in

Pulimamidi is a village in Nawabpet Mandal of Ranga Reddy district in the Indian state of Telangana, about 45 kilometres (28 mi) from Hyderabad.

== Religion ==
A temple is dedicated to Hanuman. It celebrates the Sri Rama Navami. The festivals of Bonalu and Vinayaka Chaviti are also celebrated in Pulimamidi. One of the temples called Chikati Venkateswara Swamy temple located at Pulimamidi, this temple having nearly 250 acres of land. This temple is built by Akkanna Madhanna.
