= Katta Maisamma Temple =

Coordinates: 17.6167°N 78.8000°E

Katta Maisamma temple
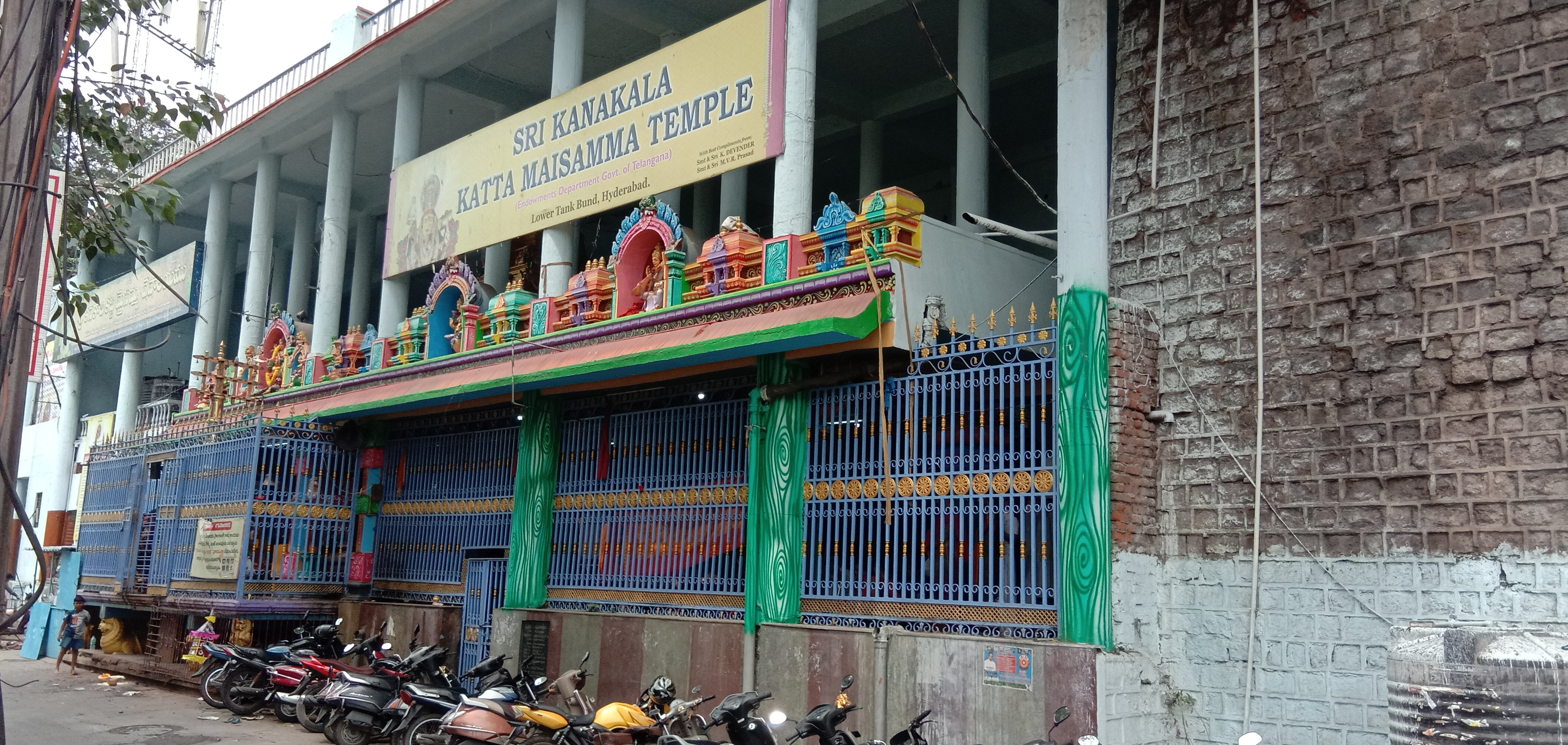
- The temple's entrance

Religion
- Affiliation: Hinduism
- Deity: Maisamma

Location
- Location: Hyderabad
- State: Telangana State
- Country: India
- Interactive map of Katta Maisamma temple

Architecture
- Type: South Indian

Katta Maisamma temple is a temple of the Hindu goddess Katta Maisamma in Hyderabad, Telangana state, India. In 2026, a man was arrested because he "committed indecent acts in front of the idol."
