= Mucherla =

Village in Telangana, India

Mucherla is a village located in Kandukur Mandal of Telangana, India. It is roughly 25 kilometers from the district headquarters of Rangareddy
