= Maisigandi Maisamma Temple Kadthal =

Maisigandi Maisamma Mandiram Kadthal is a village in Kadthal Mandal, Maisigandi village, Telangana, India.

== Gallery ==
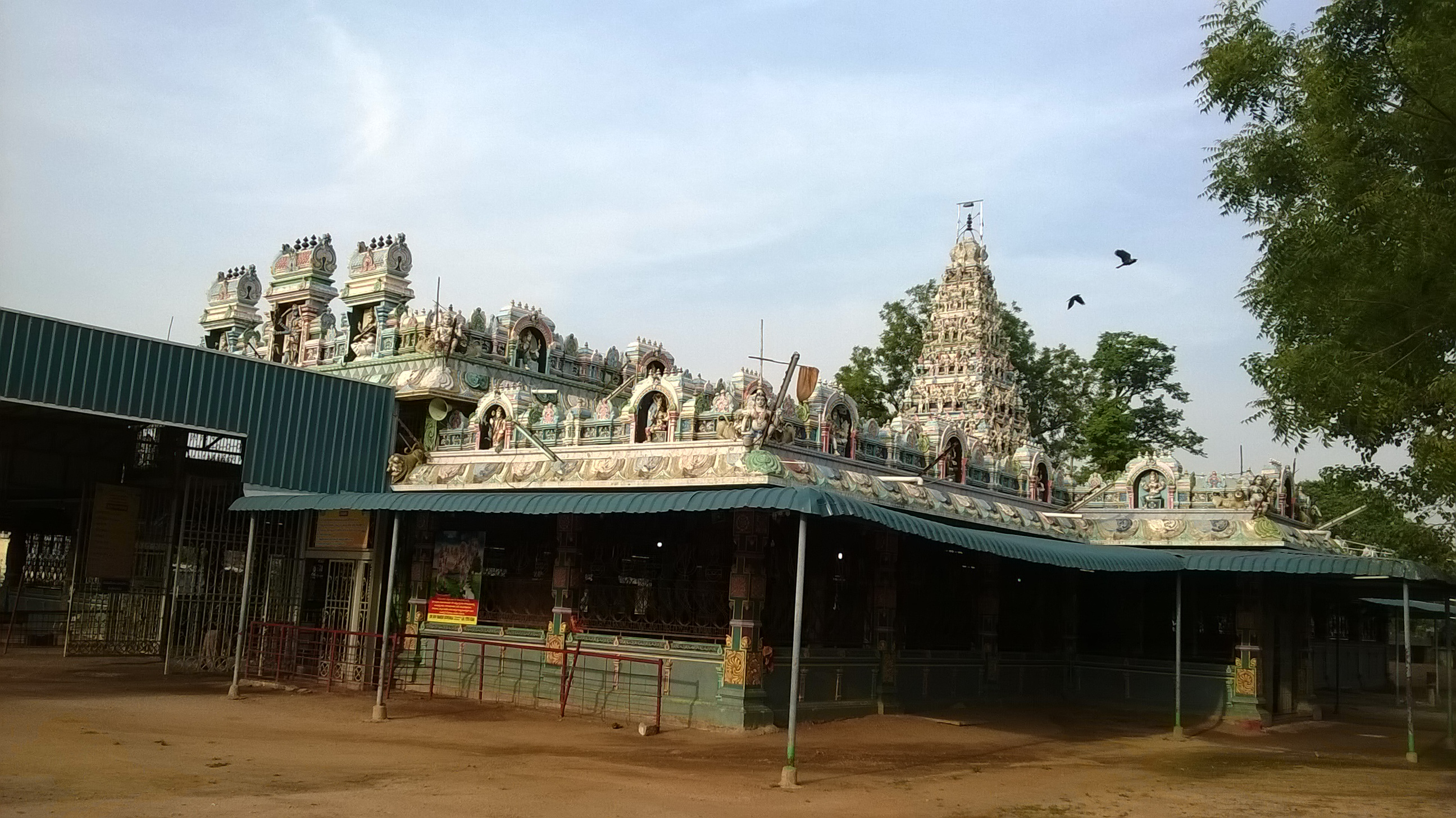

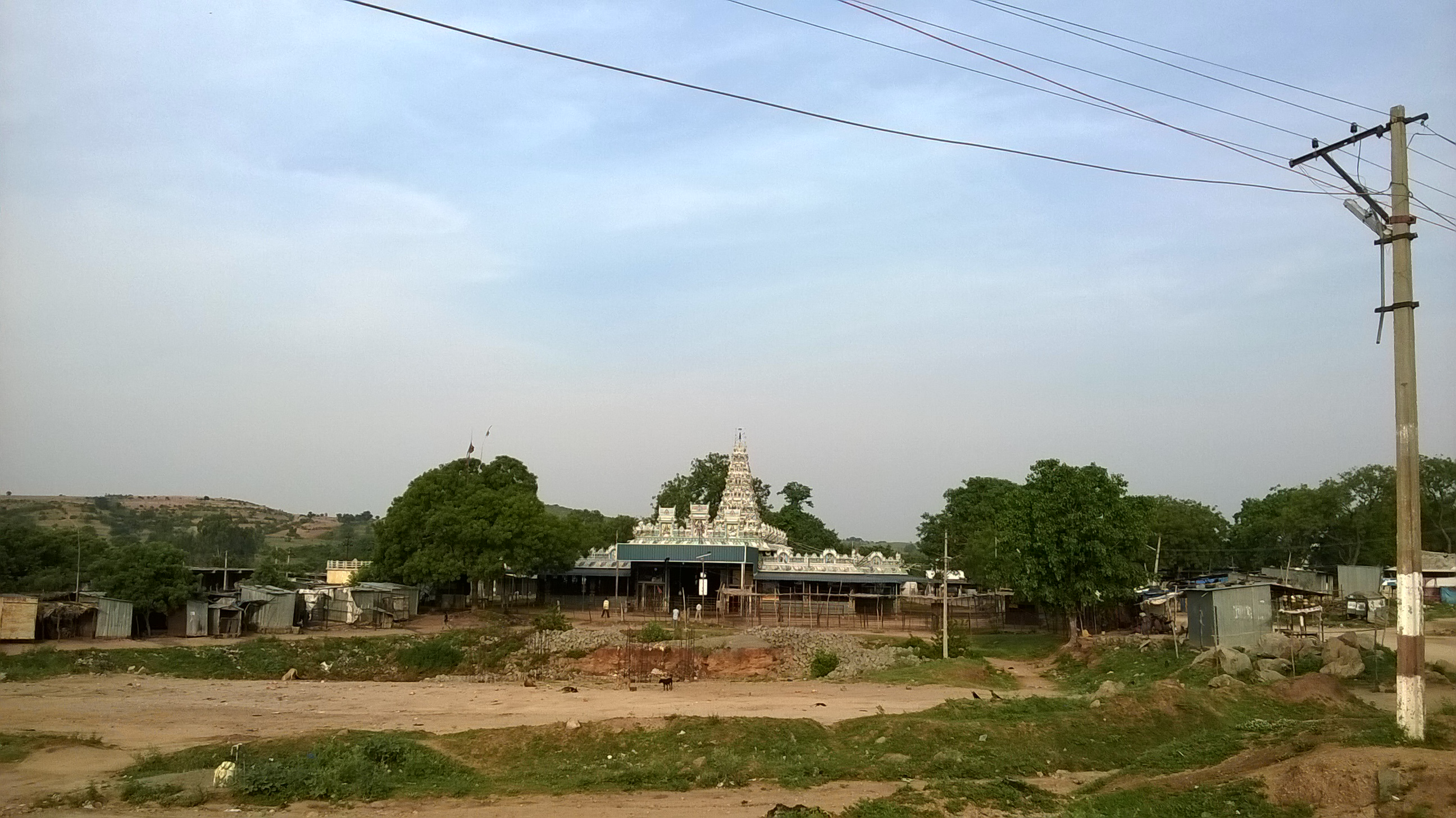
