= Miryalaguda =

- City
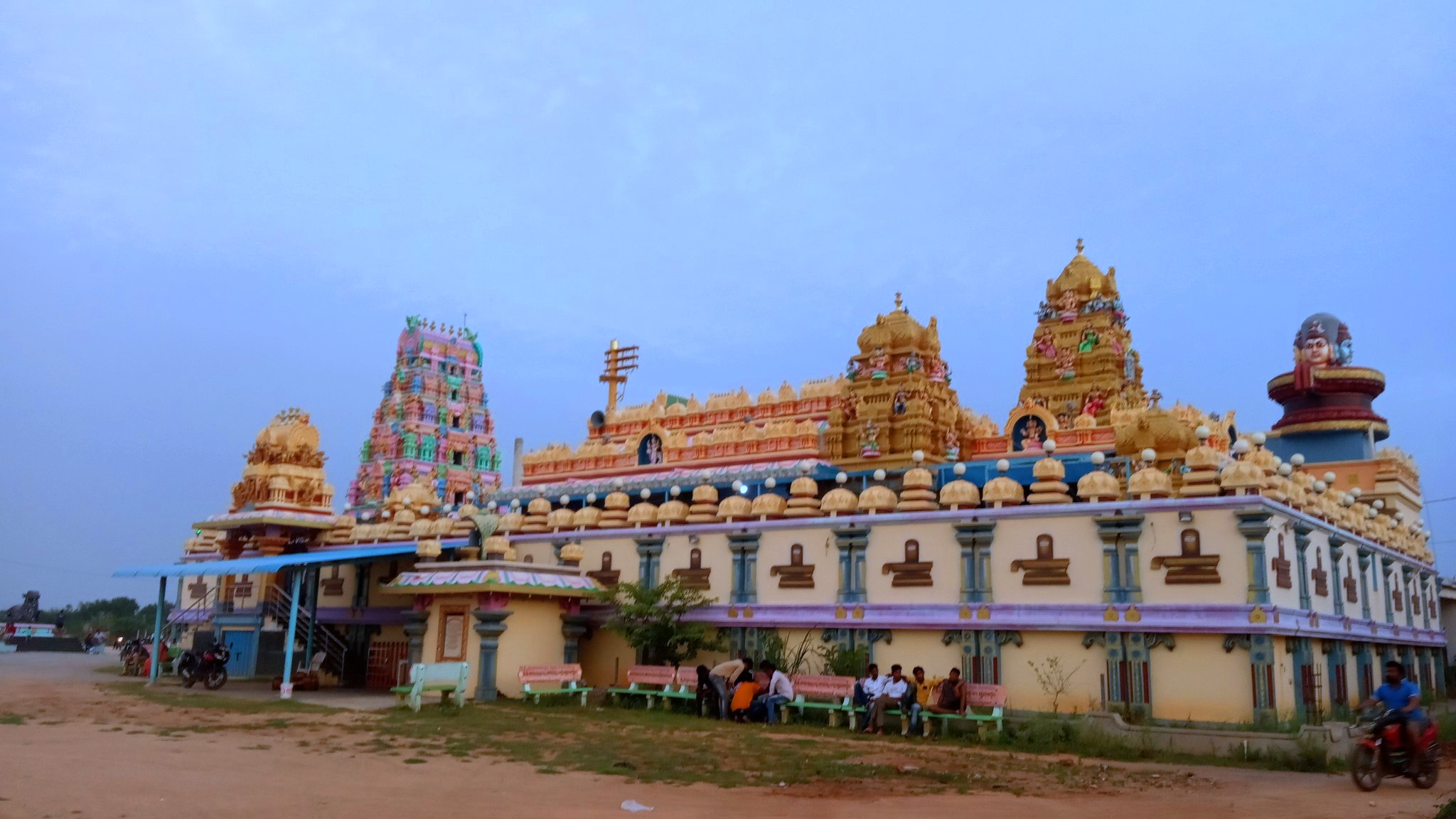
- Temple in Miryalaguda

- Location within Telangana Location within India
- Coordinates: 16.8667°N 79.5833°E
- Country: India
- State: Telangana
- District: Nalgonda

Government
  - Type: Municipality
  - Body: Miryalaguda Municipality
  - MLA: Bathula Laxma Reddy

Area
  - Total: 28.36 km^{2} (10.95 sq mi)

Population (2026)
  - Total: 154,000
  - Rank: 13th in Telangana
  - Density: 5,430/km^{2} (14,100/sq mi)

Languages
  - Official: Telugu
- Time zone: UTC+5:30 (IST)
- PIN: 508207, 508208
- Telephone code: +91-8689
- Vehicle registration: TG-05
- Sex ratio: 1000:995 ♂/♀
- Literacy: 82.09%
- Website: miryalagudamunicipality.telangana.gov.in

Miryalaguda is a city in Nalgonda district of the Indian state of Telangana. In 2015, the Government of India placed Miryalaguda under the Atal Mission for Rejuvenation and Urban Transformation scheme. Miryalaguda has received Skoch award in 2018 for its excellence in implementing "Urban Reforms". It is located about 44 kilometres (27 mi) from the district headquarters Nalgonda, 142 kilometres (88 mi) from the state capital Hyderabad. Popularly known as the "Rice Bowl of Telangana" due to its status as a major industrial hub with over 170 rice processing mills. It serves as a strategic gateway to the Krishna Valley stupas, providing the primary transport and commercial link to significant Buddhist heritage sites including Buddhavanam and Nandikonda.

== Geography ==
Miryalaguda is located at 16.8667°N 79.5833°E. It has an average elevation of 105 metres (344 ft).

== History and Archaeology ==
Miryalaguda has been serving as a significant administrative and revenue hub for over 1000 years, formerly functioning as an administrative and religious center under the rule of the Western Chalukyas and kakatiya's feudatories, later as an administrative taluka or gadi till 19th century Historical records dating back to the early 18th century document the city under consistent phonetic variants, including Mirialguda and Mirialagudem. Archival references, including Persian and Urdu land revenue records from 1724, missionary survey maps from 1812, and the David Rumsey Map Collection, confirm the long-standing existence and regional importance of the city under its current name for centuries.

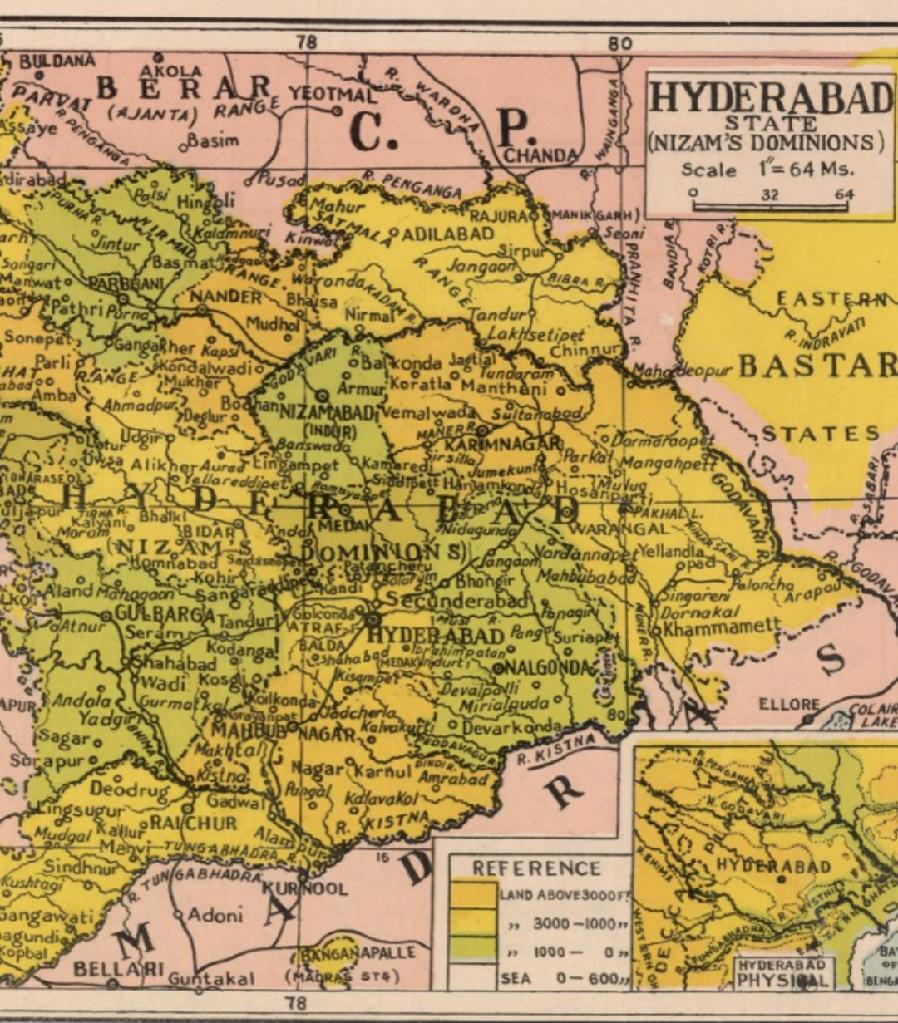
Map of Miryalaguda within the Hyderabad State Nizam's Dominions, 1909. This version from the Imperial Gazetteer of India shows Miryalaguda labeled as Mirialguda a significant administrative center. Source: David Rumsey Map Collection.

Recent archaeological surveys have identified the Miryalaguda region as a significant hub for early human activity. In May 2025, 6,000-year-old rock bruisings were discovered at Ramalingalagudem. These depict bulls, stags, dogs, and a prehistoric man in combat with a tiger. The site served as a prehistoric manufacturing center for stone axes.

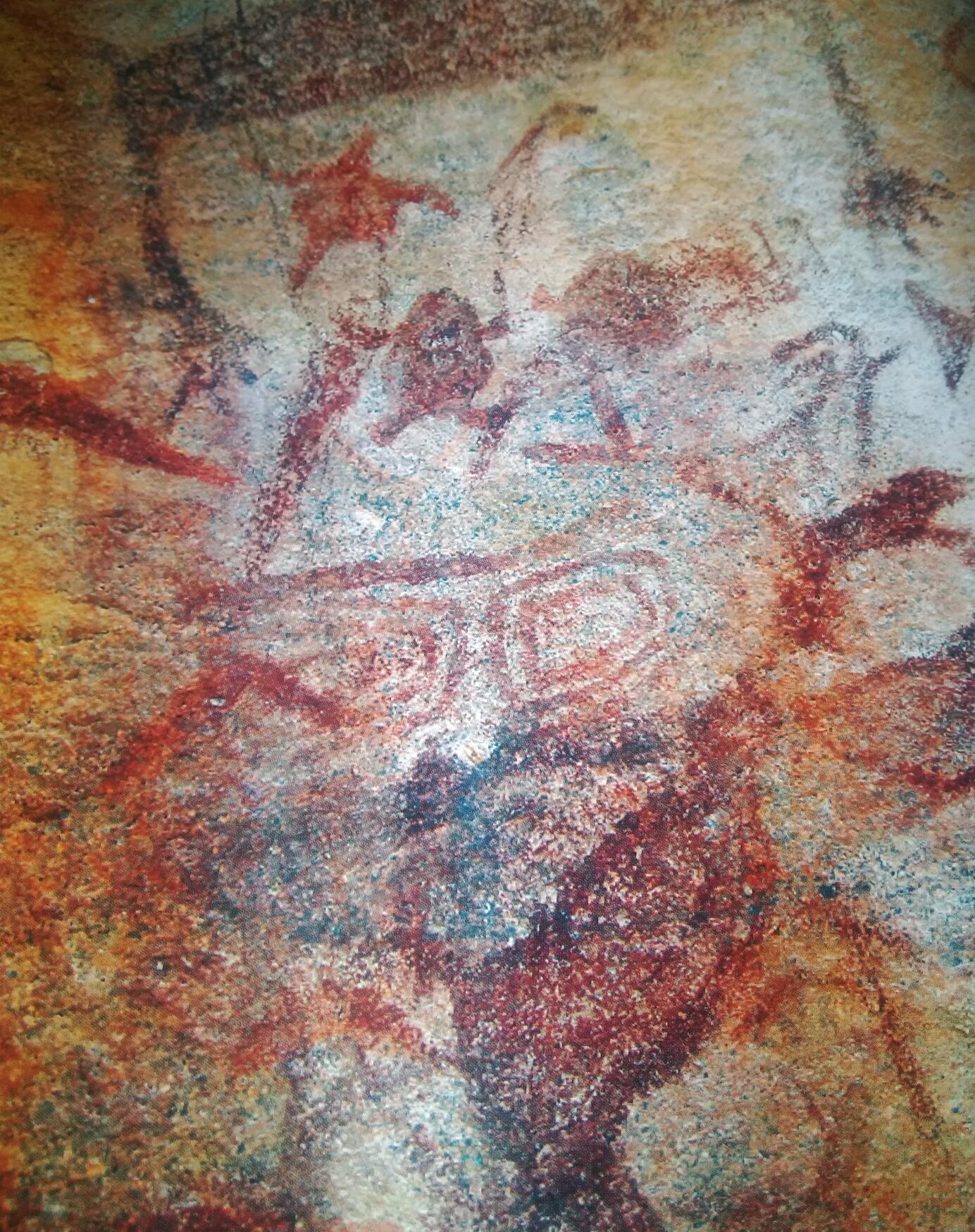
Neolithic rock art style similar to the 6000 BCE bruisings found in the Miryalaguda-Nalgonda region.

The region was ruled by several prominent dynasties including the Mauryas, Satavahanas, Chalukyas, Telugu Cholas, Kakatiyas, Reddy Kings, and the Nizam Dynasties: In 2024, 1,300-year-old temples from the Badami Chalukyan era were unearthed at Mudimanikyam village. An 8th-century inscription found here contains the word Gandaloranru, signifying a military or heroic title.

The 12th-century Vadapally Agastheshwara Temple and the Lakshmi Narasimha Swamy temple (the first pancha kshethram) were constructed by the Reddy Kings. Inscriptions from the Kanduru Choda and Kakatiya periods found within Miryalaguda show it was an active administrative center in 11th Century. The 13th-century Nagulapahad temples near Miryalaguda, reflecting Kakatiya and Reddy architectural heritage. These temples remain crucial historical and cultural markers, demonstrating the region's medieval, religious, and artistic prominence.

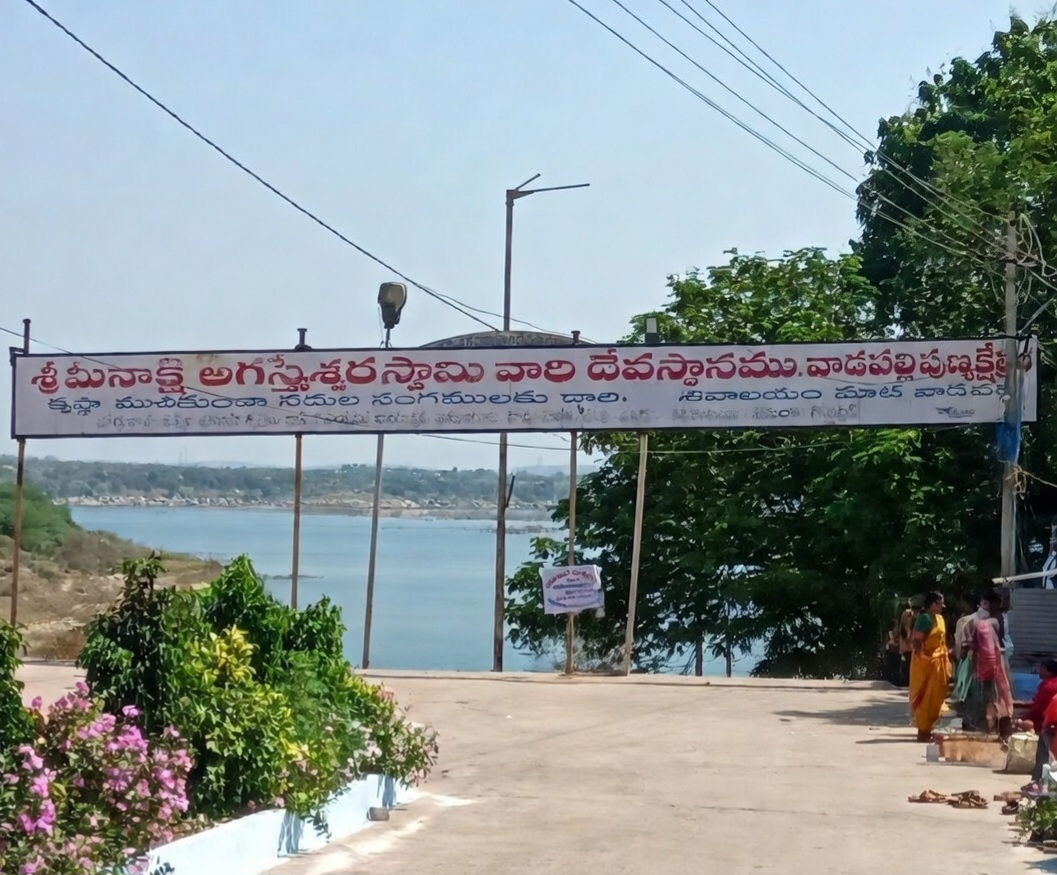
Krishna, muchukundha rivers merging point. Agastheshwara Temple, Vadapalle, Miryalaguda

The Miryalaguda Fort (locally referred to as the "Gadi") is a historical site located within the Old Town of the city near the areas of Pedda Bazar or MainBazar and Kundala Bazaar, the fort currently exists in a ruined state but remains a central cultural landmark for the community. The regional fortification of Miryalaguda is historically attributed to the Kakatiya dynasty (12th–14th century), who established a network of defensive outposts and temples throughout the Nalgonda region. Following the rise of the Asaf Jahi dynasty, the structure was repurposed as an administrative "Gadi" (seat of power) for the local Nizam administration. While much of the original structure has been lost to modern urban development, the site is noted for its ancient pathways and stone masonry that reflect medieval architectural styles.

== Climate ==
Miryalaguda experiences Tropical and Dry climate(Köppen classification: Aw). The year is characterized by intense heat, a significant monsoon season, and a short, mild winter. Temperatures generally range from 64 °F to 105 °F, with extremes sometimes falling below 59 °F or exceeding 111 °F.

Year-Long Climate Breakdown
Summer (March – June): This is the hottest period, with May being the peak month (average high of 104 °F). Days are extremely hot and dry, with temperatures often soaring above 40 °C (104 °F).

Monsoon/Rainy Season (June – October):
The southwest monsoon brings significant rainfall and humidity, with July and August being the wettest months. August averages 14 days of precipitation.

Post-Monsoon/Winter (November – February):
The climate becomes more temperate and dry. December is the coldest month, with average lows around 65 °F (18 °C) and highs of 85 °F.

Key Seasonal Characteristics:
The hottest season lasts from late March to early June. Coldest nights are in December/January. Rainfall: The wettest period is June to October, with an average annual precipitation of roughly 30-32 inches. Humidity: The region is very humid (muggy) for most of the year, particularly from February to November, with August being the most uncomfortable. Clouds: The sky is mostly cloudy from May to October, with July being the cloudiest month (94% overcast). February is generally the clearest month

Climate data for Miryalaguda (Telangana, India)
Month	Jan	Feb	Mar	Apr	May	Jun	Jul	Aug	Sep	Oct	Nov	Dec	Year
Mean daily maximum °C (°F)	30.5 (86.9)	33.6 (92.5)	37.1 (98.8)	39.7 (103.5)	40.8 (105.4)	36.5 (97.7)	32.7 (90.9)	32.0 (89.6)	32.2 (90.0)	31.9 (89.4)	30.2 (86.4)	29.3 (84.7)	33.9 (93.0)
Mean daily minimum °C (°F)	16.8 (62.2)	19.1 (66.4)	22.1 (71.8)	25.1 (77.2)	27.2 (81.0)	25.5 (77.9)	24.1 (75.4)	23.7 (74.7)	23.5 (74.3)	21.8 (71.2)	18.5 (65.3)	16.2 (61.2)	22.3 (72.1)
Average rainfall mm (inches)	2.4 (0.09)	5.2 (0.20)	10.3 (0.41)	15.6 (0.61)	35.1 (1.38)	100.8 (3.97)	135.5 (5.33)	120.2 (4.73)	130.1 (5.12)	75.4 (2.97)	15.2 (0.60)	3.1 (0.12)	648.9 (25.55)

== Demographics ==
Historical population
Year	Pop.	±%
1941	5,628	—
1951	8,801	+56.4%
1961	10,024	+13.9%
1971	19,263	+92.2%
1981	44,129	+129.1%
1991	65,879	+49.3%
2001	91,359	+38.7%
2011	109,891	+20.3%

In the 2011 Census of India, Miryalaguda had a population of 109,891.

== Governance ==
=== Civic Administration ===
Miryalaguda Municipality was constituted as a municipality in 1984 and is governed by the provisions of the Telangana State Municipalities Act, 1965 (Act). MLGM is grade-I municipality, which manages the civic services in Miryalaguda town, located in the state of Telangana (TG)

The city also Serves as headquarters of Miryalaguda mandal in the Miryalaguda revenue division

== Transport ==
=== Highways ===
- NAM Expressway National Highway
- National Highway 167

=== Bus ===
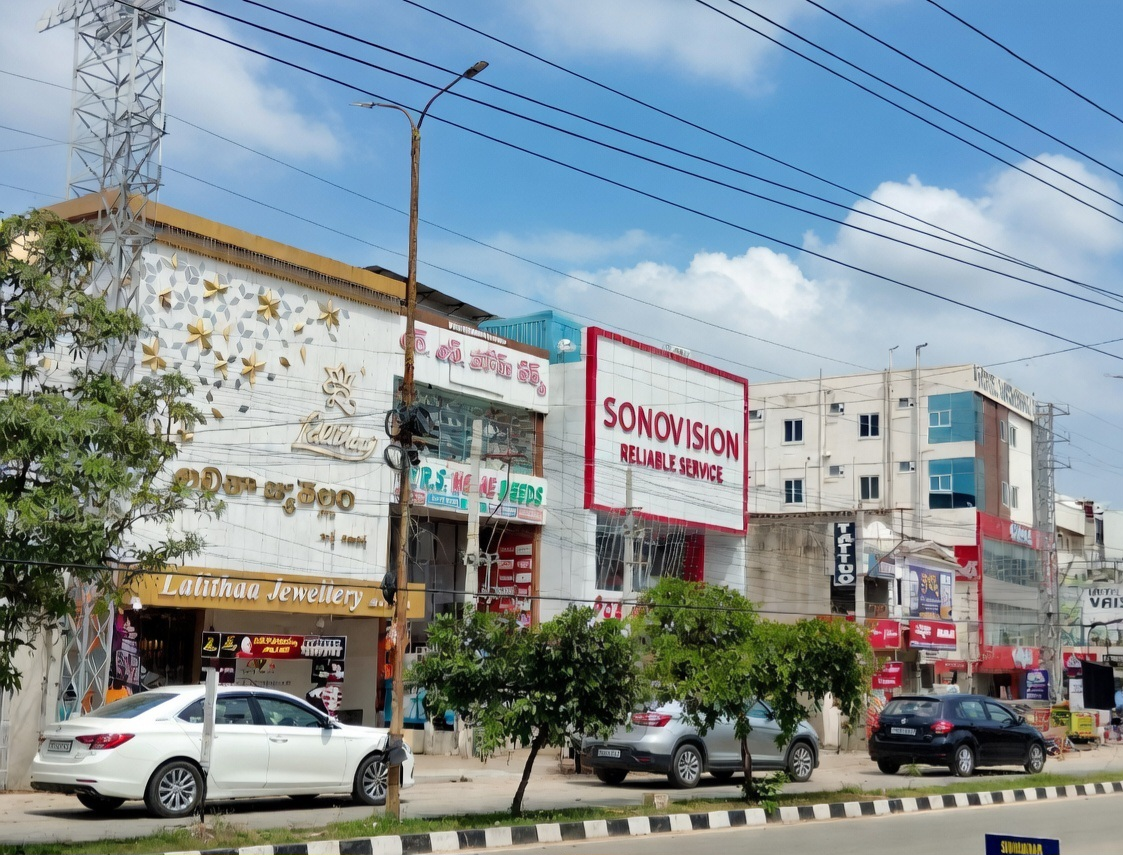
Sagar Road, Miryalaguda

~TSRTC Miryalaguda Depot operates buses from Miryalaguda Bus stand to Hyderabad, Nalgonda, Suryapet, Kodad, Neredcherla, Devarakonda, Nakrekal and Tirupathi.

=== Railway ===
The railway station has three platforms and is situated on the Pagidipalli–Nallapadu section in Guntur Division. It serves as one of the major railway station in secundrabad-guntur zone. The track is an electrified, single line; it was electrified in 2018–19. Pagidipalli-Nallapadu was electrified in 2019. The electric trains started service on 1 September 2019.

Special Trains passing through Miryalaguda

- Thiruvananthapuram-Miryalaguda-Cherlapally Amrit Bharat train
- Secundrabad-Miryalaguda-Tirupathi Vandhe Bharat train

Trains Originating from Miryalaguda

- Miryalaguda-Kacheguda demu
- Miryalaguda-Piduguralla demu

A High-Speed Rail (bullet train) station is proposed for Miryalaguda as part of the Hyderabad–Amaravati–Chennai corridor. The alignment was officially revised in 2025 to run parallel to the new Hyderabad–Amaravati Greenfield Expressway, shifting the route through the Miryalaguda region.

=== Air ===
Rajiv Gandhi International Airport in Hyderabad is the nearest airport at a distance of 156 km by road. The other airport nearer to Miryalaguda is Vijayawada International Airport which is at a distance of 168 km by road.

== Economy ==
Miryalaguda is popularly known as the "Rice Bowl of Telangana" due to its extensive rice processing industry and its role as a major exporter of parboiled rice. As a significant industrial and commercial hub, supplies rice to several Indian states, including Kerala and Bihar. Along with Rice production the city also functions as a significant hub for the cement industry, featuring several large-scale plants, such as India Cements, Deccan Cements, and Penna Cement, situated within the immediate industrial belt. These facilities, operating near by to the city, are driven by the region's vast limestone deposits.

=== Retail and Healthcare ===
The city serves as a regional retail center for the surrounding mandals. The retail sector has grown with the establishment of several national jewellery showrooms and private multi-specialty healthcare facilities.

== Culture and Entertainment ==
=== Cinema ===
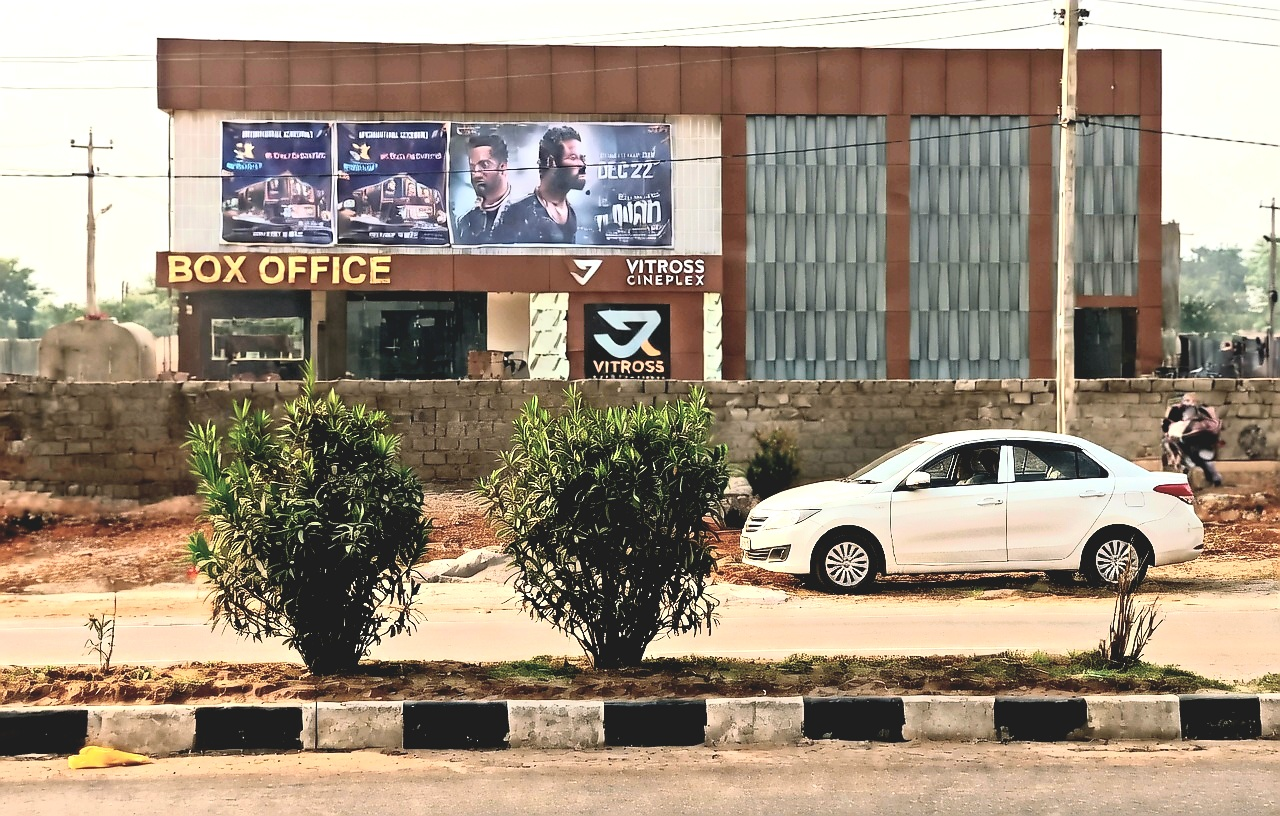
Vitross 4-screen multiplex in Miryalaguda

City is home to Vitross 4 Screen Multiplex, Asian Raghava, Asian Srinivasa and venkateshwara theatres.

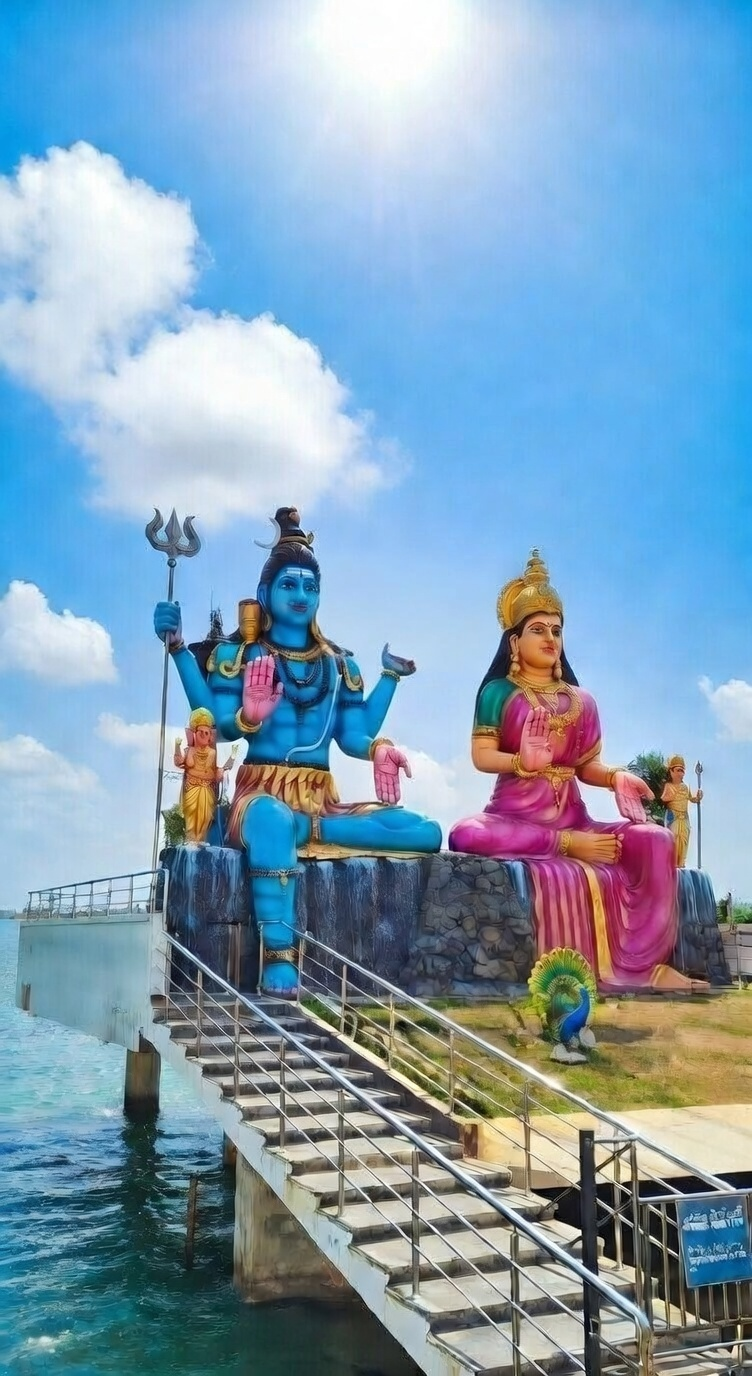
Kailasagiri near Miryalaguda boating park

Miryalaguda Boating Park Located at Yadagiripalli Lake, offers multiple boar rides and other recreation facilities provided by Telangana state tourism.

== Awards and achievements ==
Miryalaguda has received several national recognitions for its urban governance and industrial contributions:

- In 2015, the Government of India placed Miryalaguda under the Atal Mission for Rejuvenation and Urban Transformation (AMRUT) scheme for urban infrastructure development.
- The city received the Skoch Award in 2018 for its excellence in implementing "Urban Reforms".
- Miryalaguda is a major industrial hub, particularly known for its rice industry. It is one of India's leading exporters of parboiled rice, with over 170 rice processing mills located in its vicinity.
- As a 1st Grade Municipality, it has been recognized for its role in the Swachh Bharat Mission, contributing to the state of Telangana's multiple wins in the Swachh Survekshan national sanitation surveys.

== Education ==
The primary and secondary school education is imparted by government, aided and private schools, under the School Education Department of the state.

The medium of instruction followed by schools are English, Telugu and Urdu.

== Healthcare ==
Miryalaguda is a medical hub for the Nalgonda district, with facilities concentrated in Doctors Colony and Vinobha Nagar. Government services include the Area Hospital, ESI Dispensary, and several Urban Primary Health Centers.

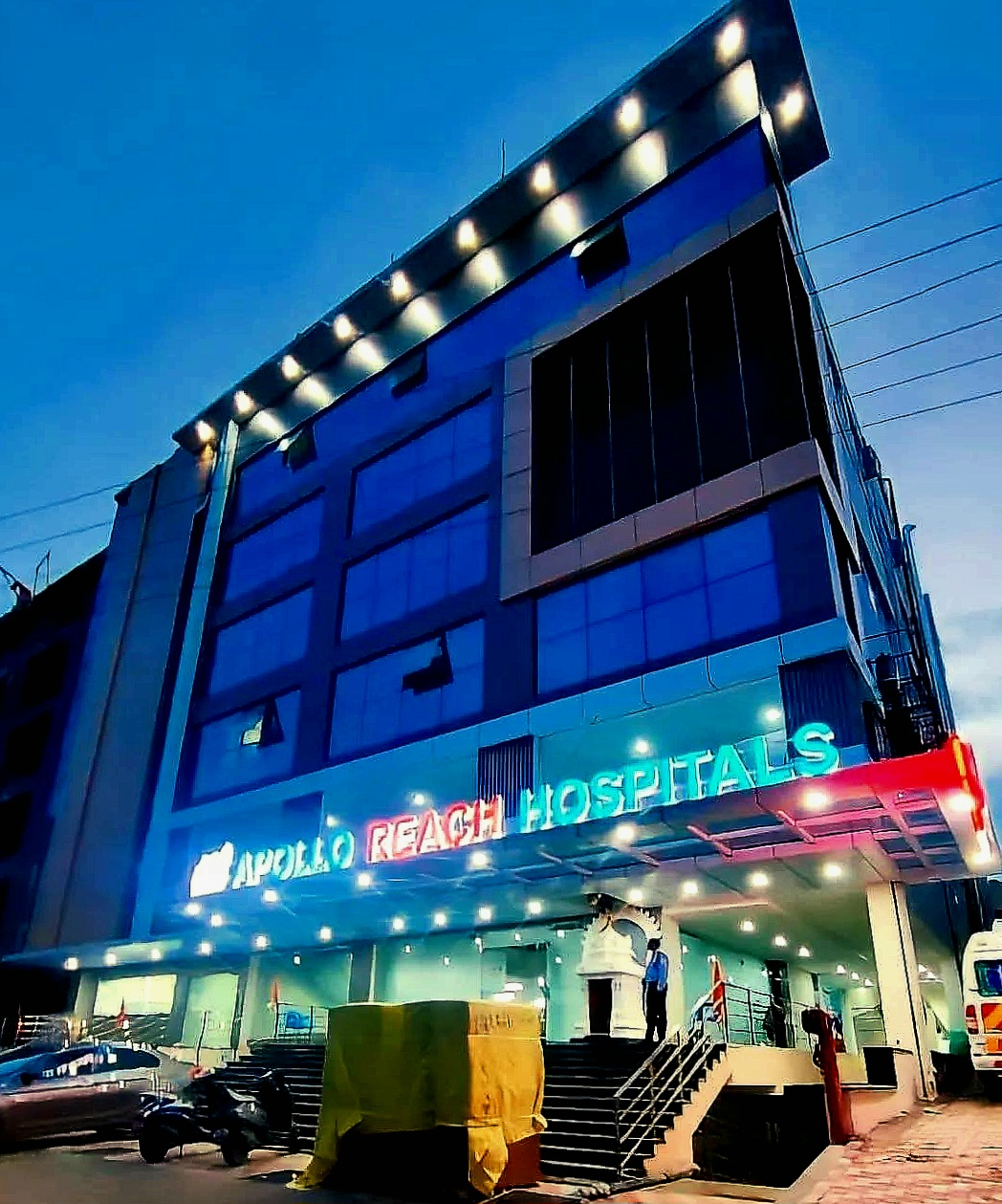
Apollo Hospital Miryalaguda

Private healthcare is provided by several multi-specialty hospitals, including the 100-bed Apollo Hospital, Jyothi Hospital, and GV Hospitals. Other notable centers include Parijatha, River, Max Care, and specialized pediatric and eye clinics.

== Sports ==
Miryalaguda has a growing sports infrastructure, particularly around cricket and badminton. One of the prominent private multi-sport facilities in the town is the Clio Sports Arena, which offers a cricket stadium, a multi-sport astroturf field, and a badminton academy. The arena provides coaching in cricket, badminton and kabaddi, along with support services such as sports nutrition, physiotherapy and sports psychology.

Apart from private facilities, Miryalaguda has an indoor stadium at NSP Camp that is used for badminton and other indoor sports. The venue is noted in local listings for its badminton courts, coaching and regular use by local players.

== See also ==
- Miryalaguda (Assembly constituency)
- List of cities in Telangana by area
- List of cities in Telangana by population
- List of Smart and Amrut Cities in Telangana
- List of cities in India by area
- Thungapahad
