= Deolali Pravara =

- Town
- Location in Maharashtra, India
- Coordinates: 19.473°N 74.620°E
- Country: India
- State: Maharashtra
- District: Ahilyanagar

Population (2001)
  - Total: 30,334
  - Estimate (2024-2025): 44,000

Languages
  - Official: Marathi
- Time zone: UTC+5:30 (IST)
- Vehicle registration: MH-17

Deolali Pravara is a town in Rahuri Taluka, Ahilyanagar District, India.

== Demographics ==
As of 2001 India census, Deolali Pravara had a population of 30,334. Males constitute 52% of the population and females 48%. Deolali Pravara has an average literacy rate of 65%, higher than the national average of 59.5%: male literacy is 73% and, female literacy is 57%. In Deolali Pravara, 12% of the population is under 6 years of age.
