= Munagala mandal =

Munagala mandal మునగాల మండలం
- Mandal
- Location in Telangana, India
- Coordinates: 16°59′52″N 79°57′55″E
- Country: India
- State: Telangana
- District: Suryapet
- Headquarters: Munagala

Population (2011)
  - Total: 43,116

Languages
  - Official: Telugu
- Time zone: UTC+5:30 (IST)
- PIN: 508233
- Vehicle registration: TS 29

Munagala mandal is one of the 23 mandals in Suryapet district of the Indian state of Telangana. It is under the administration of Kodad revenue division with its headquarters at Munagala. The mandal is bounded by Nadigudem, Mothey, Chivemla, Chilkur mandals.

== Demographics ==
Munagala mandal is having a population of 43,116 living in 10,331 Houses. Males are 21,789 and Females are 21,327. Syedmujavarpet is the smallest Village and Munagala is the biggest Village in the Mandal.

== Villages ==
As of 2011 census of India, the mandal has 11 settlements. The settlements in the mandal are listed below:

1. Munagala (CT) †
2. Thimmareddy Gudem
3. Kokkireni
4. Repala
5. Madhavaram
6. Syed Muzavarpeta
7. Nelamarri
8. Tadvai
9. Ganapavaram
10. Barakathgudem
11. Kalakova
12. Akupamula
13. Mukundapuram
14. Narsimhulagudem

Notes
(†) Mandal headquarter
