= Mallu =

Mallu is a given name and a surname. Notable people with the name include:

- A. R. Mallu (1942–1990), Indian politician
- Mallu Adil Shah, Sultan of the Bijapur Sultanate, India
- Mallu Bhatti Vikramarka (born 1961), Indian politician
- Mallu Magalhães, Brazilian singer, songwriter and musician
- Mallu Ravi (born 1950), Indian politician
- Mallu Swarajyam (1931–2022), Indian politician
- Mallu Venkata Narasimha Reddy, Indian revolutionary leader

== See also ==
- Mällu, village in Rapla County, Estonia
- Malou (disambiguation)
- Malu (disambiguation)
