= Gorantla =

Gorantla may refer to:

== Geography ==
=== Andhra Pradesh, India ===
- Gorantla, Anantapur district, village in the Anantapur district, Andhra Pradesh, India
- Gorantla, Guntur, suburb of Guntur city, Andhra Pradesh, India
- Gorantla, Sattenapalle mandal, village in Sattenapalle mandal, Guntur district, Andhra Pradesh, India

=== Telangana, India ===
- Gorentla, Suryapet district, a village in the Suryapet district, Telangana, India

== Surname ==
- Gorantla (surname)
