= Athmakur (S) mandal =

Athmakur (S) mandal ఆత్మకూరు(S) మండలం
- Mandal
- Location in Telangana, India
- Coordinates: 17.233694°N 79.699788°E
- Country: India
- State: Telangana
- District: Suryapet
- Headquarters: Atmakur

Population (2011)
  - Total: 49,419

Languages
  - Official: Telugu
- Time zone: UTC+5:30 (IST)
- PIN: 508212
- Vehicle registration: TS 29

Athmakur (S) mandal is one of the 23 mandals in Suryapet district of the Indian state of Telangana. It is under the administration of Suryapet revenue division with its headquarters at Atmakur. It is bounded by Chivvemla mandal towards South, Nuthankal mandal towards North, Mothey mandal towards East, Suryapet mandal towards South.

== Geography ==
It is in the 185 m elevation (altitude).

== Demographics ==
Athmakur (S) mandal is having population of 49,419 living in 11,582 Houses. Males are 25,167 and Females are 24,252. Gollaguda is the smallest Village and Aipur is the biggest Village in the mandal.

== Villages ==
As of 2011 census of India, the mandal has 20 settlements. The settlements in the mandal are listed below:

1. Atmakur (CT) †
2. Patharlapahad
3. Kandagatla
4. Kotapahad
5. Bopparam
6. Gattikal
7. Nemmikal
8. Gollaguda
9. Enubamula
10. Istallapuram
11. Dacharam
12. Midtanpalli
13. Kothagudem
14. Shettigudem
15. Aslathanda
16. Narayanagudem
17. Nasimpet
18. Venkatapuram
19. Aipoor
20. T. Penpahad
21. Mukkudu Devulapalli
22. Pathasuryapet

Notes
(†) Mandal headquarter
