= Patha Suryapet =

Patha Suryapet Pathasuryapeta
- Country: India
- State: Telangana
- District: Suryapet
- Mandal: Athmakur

Population (2011)
  - Total: 2,000
- PIN: 508224

Patha Suryapet (sometimes written Pathasuryapeta) is a village which is 11 km distant from Suryapet, district headquarters of Suryapet district in the Indian state of Telangana.

== History ==
In November 1946, there were violent confrontations between demonstrators and the Nizam's police and army in Patha Suryapet.

== Location ==
Patha Suryapet is a village in Atmakur Mandal. Patha Suryapet is located 140 km distance from the state capital, Hyderabad. Nearby towns are Nuthankal (11.1 km), Chivvemla (11.4 km) and Mothey(13.4 km). Patha Suryapet's Pin Code is 508222 and Post office name is Thimmapur.

== Education ==
Schools near by Patha Suryapet: 1. Z.P.High School, PATHA SURYAPET

== Climate ==
Under the Köppen climate classification, Suryapet experiences Tropical Wet and Dry Climate. The annual mean temperature is 36 °C. Monthly mean temperatures are 19–40 °C (66–104 °F). Summers (March–June) are hot and humid, with temperatures in the low 30s Celsius; during dry spells, maximum temperatures often exceed 45 °C in May and June. Winter lasts for only about two-and-a-half months, with seasonal lows dipping to 9–11 °C (48–52 °F) in December and January. May is the hottest month, with daily temperatures ranging from 35–43 °C (95–109 °F); January, the coldest month, has temperatures varying from 15–23 °C (59–73 °F). The highest recorded temperature is 51.02 °C (123.84 °F), and the lowest is 9 °C (48 °F). Rains brought by the south-west summer monsoon lash Suryapet between June and September, supplying it with most of its annual rainfall of 821.0 mm. The highest total monthly rainfall, 180.0 mm, occurs in July, October and November also experiences increased rainfall from the North East Monsoon. Winter season starts in December and lasts through February. Temperatures range from a minimum of 18 °C and can reach 33 °C.
