= Maddirala =

Coordinates: 17°25′N 79°42′E

- Village
- Interactive map of Maddirala
- Country: India
- State: Telangana
- District: Suryapet

Population (2011)
  - Total: 4,564

Languages
  - Official: Telugu
- Time zone: UTC+5:30 (IST)
- PIN: 508280
- Telephone code: 08693
- Vehicle registration: TS-29

Maddirala is a village in Suryapet district of the Indian state of Telangana.It is located in Maddirala mandal of Suryapet division. It is about 36 km from the district headquarters Suryapet.

== Demographics ==
According to census of India, 2011, Maddirala Village has total 1162 families residing. Maddirala village has population of 4564 of which 2275 are males while 2289 are females. Maddirala village population of children with age 0-6 is 459 which makes up 10.06% of total population of village. Average Sex Ratio of Maddirala village is 1006. The literacy rate of the village is 58.42% compared to 66.06% of Telangana. The Male literacy stands at 68.43% while female literacy rate was 48.50%.
