= Bopparam =

- Village
- Location in Telangana, India Bopparam (India)
- Coordinates: 17°14′15″N 79°45′45″E
- Country: India
- State: Telangana
- District: Suryapet

Population (2001)
  - Total: 1,532

Languages
  - Official: Telugu
- Time zone: UTC+5:30 (IST)
- PIN: 508221
- Vehicle registration: TS-29

Bopparam is a village located in the Athmakur (S) mandal of Suryapet district, Telangana, India. It is located is 30 km from the district headquarters, Suryapet

== Location ==
Bopparam is surrounded by Mothey Mandal towards South, Chivvemla Mandal towards South, Nuthankal Mandal towards North, Suryapet Mandal towards west. Bopparam Pin code is 508221 and postal head office is Noothankal.
