= Garidepally mandal =

Garidepally mandal గరిడేపల్లి మండలం
- Mandal
- Location in Telangana, India
- Coordinates: 16.9228223°N 79.8000°E
- Country: India
- State: Telangana
- District: Suryapet
- Headquarters: Garidepally

Population (2011)
  - Total: 54,515

Languages
  - Official: Telugu
- Time zone: UTC+5:30 (IST)
- PIN: 508201
- Vehicle registration: TS 29

Garidepally mandal is one of the 23 mandals in Suryapet district in the Indian state of Telangana. It is under the administration of the Huzurnagar revenue division, with its headquarters at Garidepally. It is bounded by Neredcherla mandal to the west, Huzurnagar mandal to the east, Penpahad mandal to the north, and Mattampally mandal to the south.

== Geography ==
Garidepally mandal is about 112 metres (367 ft) in elevation.

== Demographics ==
Garidepally mandal is having a population of 54,515 living in 13,066 Houses. Males are 27,708 and Females are 26,807. Kuthubshapur is the smallest Village and Garidepally is the biggest Village .

== Villages ==
At the 2011 census of India, the mandal had 13 settlements:

1. Garidepally (CT) †
2. Marrikunta
3. Ponugode
4. Kalmalcheruvu
5. Sarvaram
6. Gaddipalli
7. Kutubshapur
8. Velidanda
9. Rayangudem
10. Talla Malkapur
11. Kalvapalli
12. Ganugubanda
13. Rangapuram
14. Regulagadda Thanda
15. Kothagudem
16. Appannapeta

Notes
(†) Mandal headquarter
