= Jajireddigudem =

- Village
- Location in Telangana, India
- Coordinates: 17°19′41″N 79°29′10″E
- Country: India
- State: Telangana
- District: Suryapet

Area
  - Total: 35.85 km^{2} (13.84 sq mi)

Population (2011)
  - Total: 9,223
  - Density: 257.3/km^{2} (666.3/sq mi)

Languages
  - Official: Telugu
- Time zone: UTC+5:30 (IST)
- PIN: 508224
- Vehicle registration: TS
- Nearest city: Suryapet
- Sex ratio: (female)900 : 1000 (male) ♂/♀
- Lok Sabha constituency: Bhongiri
- Vidhan Sabha constituency: Thungathurthy
- Climate: hot (Köppen)
- Website: telangana.gov.in

Jajireddigudem is a village in Suryapet district of the Indian state of Telangana. It is located in Jajireddygudem mandal of Suryapet division. It is about 30 km from the district headquarters Suryapet.
