= Thirumalagiri mandal =

Thirumalagiri mandal తిరుమలగిరి మండలం
- Mandal
- Location in Telangana, India
- Coordinates: 17.503938°N 79.42955°E
- Country: India
- State: Telangana
- District: Suryapet
- Headquarters: Thirumalagiri

Population (2011)
  - Total: 38,633

Languages
  - Official: Telugu
- Time zone: UTC+5:30 (IST)
- PIN: 508223
- Vehicle registration: TS 29

Thirumalagiri mandal is one of the 23 mandals in Suryapet district of the Indian state of Telangana. It is under the administration of Suryapet revenue division with its headquarters at Thirumalagiri. It is bounded by Nagaram mandal towards South, Thungathurthy mandal towards East, Yadadri district towards West, Jangaon district towards North.

== Geography ==
It is in the 357 m elevation(altitude) .

== Demographics ==
Thirumalagiri mandal is having population of 38,633. Thirumalagiri is the largest and Siddisamudram is the smallest village in the mandal.

== Villages ==
As of 2011 census of India, the mandal has 12 settlements. The settlements in the mandal are listed below:

1. Thirumalagiri (CT) †
2. Tatipamula
3. Nandapoor
4. Anantharam
5. Thonda
6. Velichala
7. Mamidyala
8. Jalalpuram
9. Siddisamudram
10. Gundepuri
11. Bandlapally
12. Malipur

Notes
(†) Mandal headquarter
