= Karvirala Kothagudem =

Karvirala
- Village
- Location in Telangana, India Karvirala (India)
- Coordinates: 17°27′24″N 79°37′33″E
- Country: India
- State: Telangana
- District: Suryapet

Population (2011)
  - Total: 2,868

Languages
  - Official: Telugu, Urdu
- Time zone: UTC+5:30 (IST)
- PIN: 508280
- Telephone code: 08693
- Vehicle registration: TS–29
- Website: telangana.gov.in

Karvirala Kottagudem is a village in Suryapet district.

== Geography ==
It is 6 km from Thungathurthy Mandal. Gorentla and Karvirala, Annaram and Maddirala are the nearest villages.

== Temples ==
There are three temples: Peddama Thalli, Renuka Yellamma, and Savarlachchamma.
