= Atmakur, Suryapet district =

Atmakur Atmakur (S)
- Village
- Location in Telangana, India Atmakur (India)
- Coordinates: 16.723015°N 79.337425°E
- Country: India
- State: Telangana
- District: Suryapet

Population (2011)
  - Total: 5,960

Languages
  - Official: Telugu
- Time zone: UTC+5:30 (IST)
- Vehicle registration: TS 29

Atmakur is a village in Suryapet district of the Indian state of Telangana. It is located in Athmakur (S) mandal of Suryapet division.
