= Gorentla =

Village in Andhra Pradesh, India

Gorentla is a village located in Maddirala mandal, Suryapet district , Telangana. It had a population of 3,899 across 1,018 households in the 2011 Census of India.
