= Penpahad mandal =

Penpahad mandal పెన్‌పహాడ్‌ మండలం
- Mandal
- Location in Telangana, India
- Coordinates: 17.026111°N 79.683333°E
- Country: India
- State: Telangana
- District: Suryapet
- Headquarters: Penpahad

Population (2011)
  - Total: 38,541

Languages
  - Official: Telugu
- Time zone: UTC+5:30 (IST)
- PIN: 508213
- Vehicle registration: TS 29

Penpahad mandal is one of the 23 mandals in Suryapet district of the Indian state of Telangana. It is under the administration of Suryapet revenue division with its headquarters at Penpahad. It is bounded by Suryapet mandal towards North, Chivvemla mandal towards North, Neredcherla mandal towards South, Munagala mandal towards East.

== Geography ==
It is in the 152 m elevation(altitude) .

== Demographics ==
Penpahad mandal is having population of 38,541 living in 9,347 Houses. Males are 19,522 and Females are 19,019 . Cheedella is the largest village and Nagulapahad is the smallest village in the mandal.

== Villages ==
As of 2011 census of India, the mandal has 17 settlements. The settlements in the mandal are listed below:

1. Penpahad (CT) †
2. Cheedella
3. Potlapahad
4. Bhakthalapuram
5. Dharmapuram
6. Rajpeta
7. Anajipur
8. Dosapahad
9. Anantharam
10. Mohammadapur
11. Nagulapahad
12. Macharam
13. Annaram
14. Lingala
15. Dupahad
16. Gajulamalkapuram
17. Singareddy Palem
18. Thangellagudem

Notes
(†) Mandal headquarter
