= Jajireddygudem mandal =

Jajireddygudem mandal జాజిరెడ్డిగూడెం మండలం
- Mandal
- Location in Telangana, India
- Coordinates: 17.327698°N 79.571114°E
- Country: India
- State: Telangana
- District: Suryapet
- Headquarters: Jajireddigudem

Population (2011)
  - Total: 28,370

Languages
  - Official: Telugu
- Time zone: UTC+5:30 (IST)
- PIN: 508222
- Vehicle registration: TS 29

Jajireddygudem Mandal also spell Jajireddigudem Mandal is one of the 23 mandals in Suryapet district of the Indian state of Telangana. It is under the administration of Suryapet revenue division with its headquarters at Jajireddigudem. It is bounded by Nuthankal mandal towards East, Suryapet mandal towards South, Nagaram mandal towards North, Yadadri district towards West.

== Geography ==
It is in the 256 m elevation(altitude) .

== Demographics ==
Jajireddygudem mandal is having population of 28,370. Jajireddygudem is the largest village and Velpucherla is the smallest village in the mandal.

== Villages ==
As of 2011 census of India, the mandal has 12 settlements. The settlements in the mandal are listed below:

1. Jajireddigudem (CT) †
2. Parsaipally
3. Bollampally
4. Kesaram
5. Uyyalavada
6. Kunchamarthy
7. Timmapur
8. Adivemla
9. Velpucherla
10. Kasarlapahad
11. Kommala
12. Kodoor

Notes
(†) Mandal headquarter
