= Anantharam, Suryapet district =

Anantharam is a village in Penpahad Mandal in Suryapet district of Telangana State, India. It is located 20 km east of district headquarters, Suryapet.

Anantharam'spostal head office is Suryapet. Most of its people speak Telugu. There is one primary school and one secondary school. Most residents depend on agriculture for their income.

Anantharam village is very peaceful and covered with green fields all over. Festivals are celebrated widely irrespective of caste. The village president conducts games before Dasara where Kabaddi, cricket, chess, rangoli competitions are held and prizes are given on Dasara day.

== Location ==
Anantharam is surrounded by Suryapet Mandal and Chivvemla Mandal towards the north, Nereducherla Mandal towards the south, Munagala Mandal towards the east.

== Nearby cities ==
Suryapet, Miryalaguda, Kodad, Jaggaiahpet are nearby cities.

== Schools ==
- ZP High School
- ZP Primary School
- Auro Bindo Matha English medium school
