= Undrugonda =

- Village
- Location in Telangana, India
- Coordinates: 17.1415°N 79.6236°E
- Country: India
- State: Telangana
- District: Suryapet

Population (2001)
  - Total: 1,106

Languages
  - Official: Telugu
- Time zone: UTC+5:30 (IST)
- Vehicle registration: TS-29

Undrugonda is a village in Chivvemla mandal of Suryapet district in Telangana, India.
