= Kotapahad =

- Village
- Location in Telangana, India Kotapahad (India)
- Coordinates: 17°14′15″N 79°45′45″E
- Country: India
- State: Telangana
- District: Suryapet

Population (2001)
  - Total: 1,322

Languages
  - Official: Telugu
- Time zone: UTC+5:30 (IST)
- Vehicle registration: TS 29

Kotapahad is a village in Suryapet district in Telangana, India. It falls under Athmakur (S) mandal.
