= Ganugabanda =

- Village
- Location in Telangana, India Ganugabanda (India)
- Coordinates: 16°50′45″N 79°46′23″E
- Country: India
- State: Telangana
- District: Suryapet

Languages
  - Official: Telugu
- Time zone: UTC+5:30 (IST)
- PIN: 508201
- Telephone code: yes
- Nearest city: Suryapet
- Literacy: 79%
- Lok Sabha constituency: Nalgonda
- Vidhan Sabha constituency: Huzurnagar
- Climate: Normal (Köppen)

Ganugabanda is a village in the Garidepally mandal of Suryapet district, Telangana state, India.
