= Chivvemla mandal =

Chivvemla mandal చివ్వెంల మండలం
- Mandal
- Location in Telangana, India
- Coordinates: 17.100105°N 79.693222°E
- Country: India
- State: Telangana
- District: Suryapet
- Headquarters: Chivvemla

Population (2011)
  - Total: 44,301

Languages
  - Official: Telugu
- Time zone: UTC+5:30 (IST)
- PIN: 508213
- Vehicle registration: TS 29

Chivvemla mandal is one of the 23 mandals in Suryapet district of the Indian state of Telangana. It is under the administration of Suryapet revenue division with its headquarters at Chivvemla. It is bounded by Suryapet mandal towards west, Athmakur (S) mandal towards North, Mothey mandal towards East, Penpahad mandal towards South.

== Geography ==
It is in the 185 m elevation (altitude) .

== Demographics ==
Chivvemla mandal is having population of 44,301 living in 9,868 Houses, Males are 22,630 and Females are 21,671 . Vattikhammam Pahad is the largest village and Thuljaraopet is the smallest village in the mandal.

== Villages ==
As of 2011 census of India, the mandal has 15 settlements. The settlements in the mandal are listed below:

1. Chivvemla (CT) †
2. Undrugonda
3. Kuda Kuda
4. Durajpally
5. Vattikhammam Pahad
6. Thuljaraopet
7. Gumpula
8. Thirumalagiri
9. Gunjaloor
10. Chandupatla
11. Thimmapur
12. Beebigudem
13. Vallabhapuram
14. Gayamvarigudem
15. Ailapur

Notes
(†) Mandal headquarter
