= Kandagatla =

Coordinates: 17°16′N 79°38′E

- Village
- Interactive map of Kandagatla
- Country: India
- State: Telangana
- District: Suryapet

Languages
  - Official: Telugu
- Time zone: UTC+5:30 (IST)

Kandagatla is a village in Suryapet district in Telangana, India. It falls under Athmakur (S) mandal. It is famous for Thati kallu (White Water) and is surrounded by mountains.

== Festivals ==
They celebrate all festivals such like Vinayaka chavithi, Batukamma, Dussehra, Bonalu, Diwali, Sankrathri, Ramjan, and Christmas.

== Cultivation ==
The main source of income for this village is cultivation. Rice, chilis, and cotton are the main crops for the farmers here. The crops like pesara (mong dal), kandulu (toor dal), ground nut, etc. are other choice here. Apart from regular crops, people here are also cultivate vegetables in all seasons. Tomato, chilli, Brinjal, and Lady finger are some of the vegetables cultivates here.

== Education ==
The literacy level of Kandagatla is more than 50% because of well-organized ZPH school. Some residents migrated to the U.S. and U.K. This village is an example of communal harmony.

== Politics ==
The village was part of Suryapet assembly constituency. Present Sarpanch Srimathi Sri Shiga Nagamani garu from Congress party The current MLA is Gunthakandla Jagadeeshwar Reddy from TRS Party and The main political parties in this village are Congress TRS and BJP. Total number of votes in this village is 4,529.

== Geography ==
Kandagatla is a village in Atmakur(s) Mandal in Suryapet District of Telangana, India. It belongs to Telangana region. It is located 17 km towards East from District headquarters Suryapet. 10 km from Atmakur(S). Kandagatla Pin code is 508224and postal head office is Thimmapur. Nemmikal (6 km), Balemla ( 7 km ), Yerkaram (7 km), Kodur (7 km), Enubamula (8 km) are the nearby villages. Kandagatla is surrounded by Atmakur(S) Mandal towards East, Nuthankal Mandal towards west, Chivvemla Mandal to the north, Suryapet Mandal to the south. Suryapet, Miryalaguda, Kodad, and Khammam are near Kandagatla.

== Demographics ==
Telugu is the local language. The total population of Kandagatla is 4,529, with 2,255 males and 2,274 females living in 1,096 houses. The total area of Kandagatla is 2,554 hectares.
