= Thungathurthy mandal =

Thungathurthy mandal తుంగతుర్తి మండలం
- Mandal
- Location in Telangana, India
- Coordinates: 17.456783°N 79.625931°E
- Country: India
- State: Telangana
- District: Suryapet
- Headquarters: Thungathurthy

Population (2011)
  - Total: 43,342

Languages
  - Official: Telugu
- Time zone: UTC+5:30 (IST)
- PIN: 508280
- Vehicle registration: TS 29

Thungathurthy mandal is one of the 23 mandals in the Suryapet district of the Indian state of Telangana. It is under the administration of the Suryapet revenue division with its headquarters at Thungathurthy. It is bounded by Nagaram mandal, Nuthankal mandal, Maddirala mandal, and Mahabubabad district on the west, south, east, and north, respectively.

== Geography ==
Thungathurthy mandal lies at 223 metres' altitude, or roughly 732 feet.

== Demographics ==
Thungathurthy mandal has a population of 43,342 as of 2011. Thungathurthy is the largest village and Keshavapoor is the smallest village in the mandal.

== Villages ==
As of 2011 census of India, the mandal has 12 settlements. The settlements in the mandal are listed below:

1. Thungathurthy (CT) †
2. Karvirala
3. Velugupalli
4. Annaram
5. Ravulapally
6. Manapur
7. Vempaty
8. Banda Ramaram
9. Ganugu Banda
10. Keshavapoor
11. Sangam
12. Gottiparthy

Notes
(†) Mandal headquarter
