= Penpahad =

- Location in Telangana, India Penpahad (India)
- Coordinates: 17.026111°N 79.683333°E
- Country: India
- State: Telangana
- District: Suryapet

Languages
  - Official: Telugu
- Time zone: UTC+5:30 (IST)
- PIN: 508213
- Telephone code: 08684
- Vehicle registration: TS 29

Penpahad is a village in Suryapet district of the Indian state of Telangana. It is the headquarters of Penpahad mandal of Suryapet division. It is located 18 km from district headquarters, Suryapet.

== Geography ==
It is in the 152 m (499 ft) elevation (altitude).

== Demographics ==
Penpahad has population of 2887 of which 1509 are males while 1,378 are females as per Population Census 2011. The literacy rate of village was 66.03% where male literacy stands at 77.61% and female literacy rate at 54.41%.

== Politics ==
It falls under Suryapet Assembly constituency and the village is administrated by a sarpanch, who is the elected representative of the village.
