= Venkepally =

Venkepally Venkepalle
- village
- Location in Telangana, India Venkepally (India)
- Coordinates: 17°20′42″N 79°38′31″E
- Country: India
- State: Telangana
- District: Suryapet

Languages
  - Official: Telugu
- Time zone: UTC+5:30 (IST)

Venkepally is a medium size village/hamlet in Nuthankal Mandal in Suryapet district of Telangana state, India. It comes under Venkepally Panchayath.It is located 26 km east of the district headquarters of Suryapet and 150 km from the state capital Hyderabad.

This village is one of the best agriculture village and it is famous for mangoes in Suryapet dist with more than 500 acres.

== Demographics ==
Telugu is the local language. Total population of Venkepally is 1606. Males are 817 and females are 789, living in 392 Houses. Total area of Venkepally is 632 hectares.

=== History ===
Bandi Yadagiri is an Indian revolutionary poet from this village, who participated in the Telangana Rebellion of 1946–1951. He penned the famous song Bandi enka Bandi Katti against feudal lords.
