= Penchikal dinna =

- Village
- Location in Telangana, India
- Coordinates: 16.8321°N 79.4356°E
- Country: India
- State: Telangana
- District: Suryapet

Area
  - Total: 16.54 km^{2} (6.39 sq mi)

Population (2011)
  - Total: 2,905
  - Density: 175.6/km^{2} (454.9/sq mi)

Languages
  - Official: Telugu
- Time zone: UTC+5:30 (IST)
- PIN: 508218
- Telephone code: 08683
- Vehicle registration: TS-29

Penchikal dinna (also spelled as Penchikaldinne) is a village in Neredcherla mandal, Suryapet district in Telangana state, India. Penchikaldinna village is also called Moscow nagar in the times of Telangana freedom fight from nizam nawabs. It is located 43 km towards South from District headquarters Suryapet. There are many freedom fighters from this village who fought against nizam nawabs.president of the village from 2019 to 2024 is sunkari Vani

== Location ==
Penchikal Dinna is a village panchayat located in the Suryapet district of Telangana state, India. The latitude 17.0586693 and longitude 79.265585 are the geocoordinate of the Penchikal Dinna. Village is 5 km from Neredcherla and almost 23 km from Miryalaguda. It is surrounded by Garide Pally Mandal towards East, Miryalaguda Town towards west, Penpahad towards North, Vemula Pally towards west.

=== Politics ===
It is a gram panchayat headed by a Sarpanch the incumbent Sarpanch is Sunkara Kranthi Kumar(CPM). The village comes under Huzurnagar Assembly constituency which become a separate assembly constituency with the delimitation in 2009 elections. First MLA is captain N. Uttam Kumar reddy.

=== Temples ===
Temples in the village include Ramalayam Temple, Anjaneyaswami temple, Vigneshwara Temple, Kanakadurga Temple and Mutyalamma Temple.

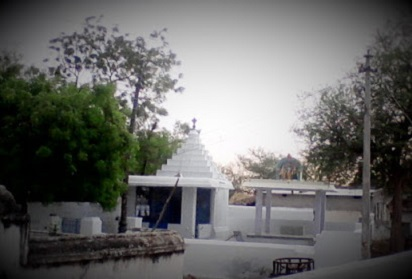
Ramalayam Temple

=== Economy ===
The village is depends on the Nagarjuna-Sagar left canal, and the village economy is based on rice cultivation. 90% of the economy of the village is from rice and daily wages.
modern agricultural practices are done.(Paddy Straw Baler)

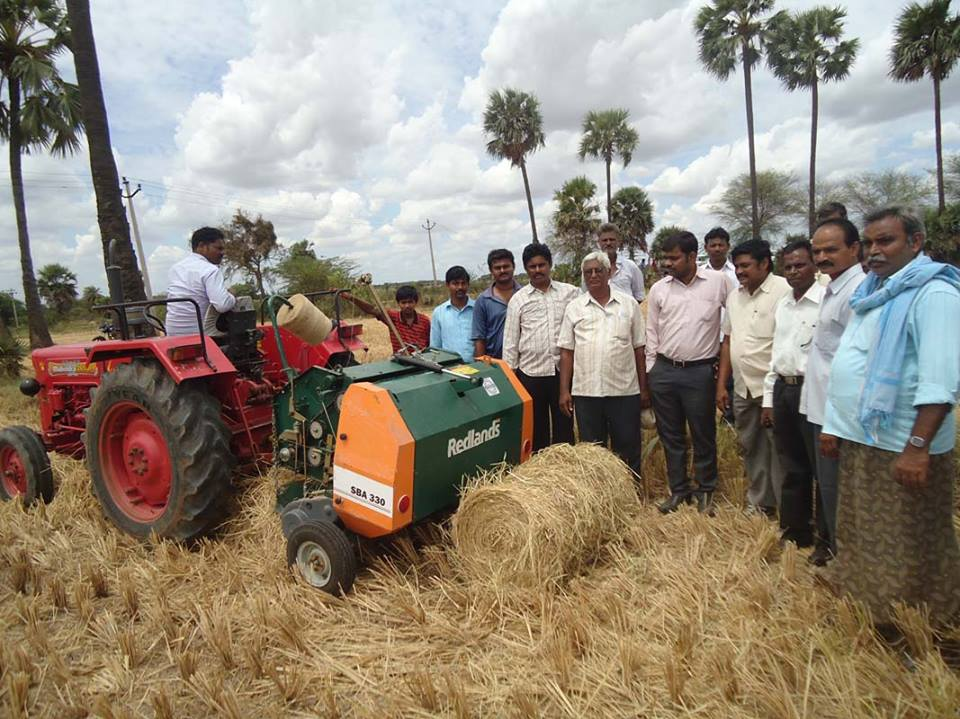
Paddy Straw Baler

=== Facilities ===
Village has one Primary school, Anganvadi school, Library, Government Hospital, Bank, Post Office, two Water tanks and Power supply. school has history of 75 years.

=== Transport ===
Sharing autos are available daily from Nereducherla, TSRTC runs buses on week days between Suryapet and miryalaguda connecting this village.

==== By Road ====
Nereducherla, the mandal headquarters is 5 km away from the village.

==== By Public Bus ====
Nereducharla TSRTC Bus Station is the nearby Bus Station to Penchikal Dinna. TSRTC runs Number of buses from major cities to here.

== Notable people ==
Ex CPM MLA Aribandi LaxmiNarayana is from the village of Penchikaldinna.

=== Sub Villages in Penchikal Dinna ===
Telaga Ramaiahgudem
Gantavari Gudem

== Gallery ==
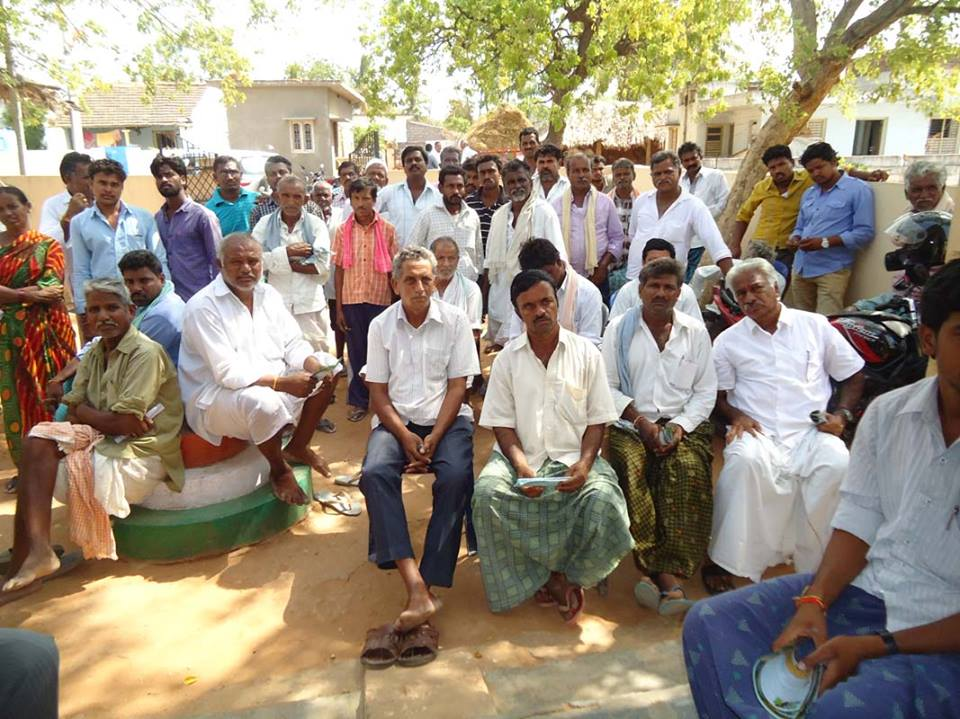
Different Meetings Held in Penchikal dinna

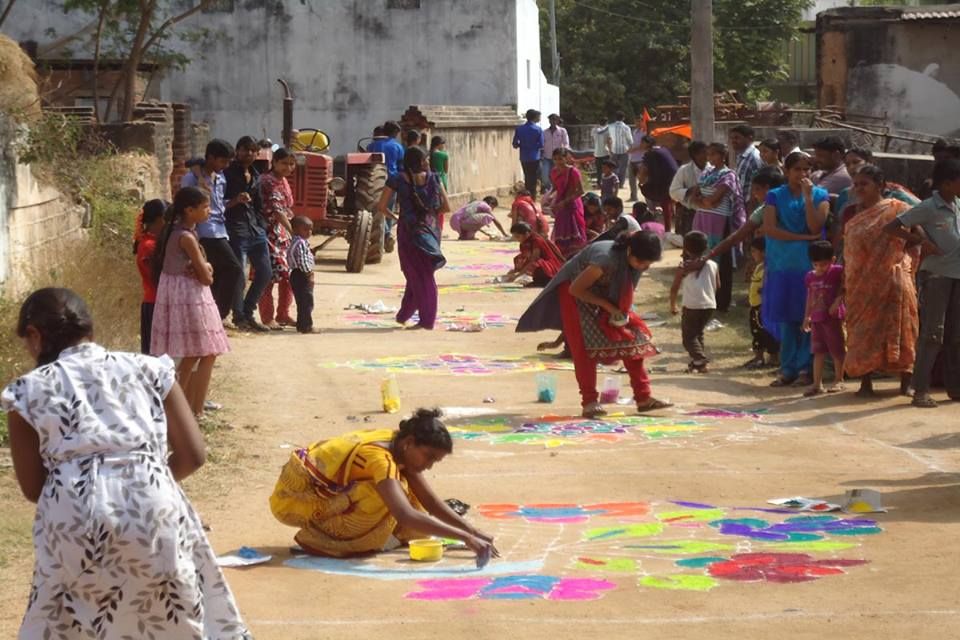
Rangoli competition

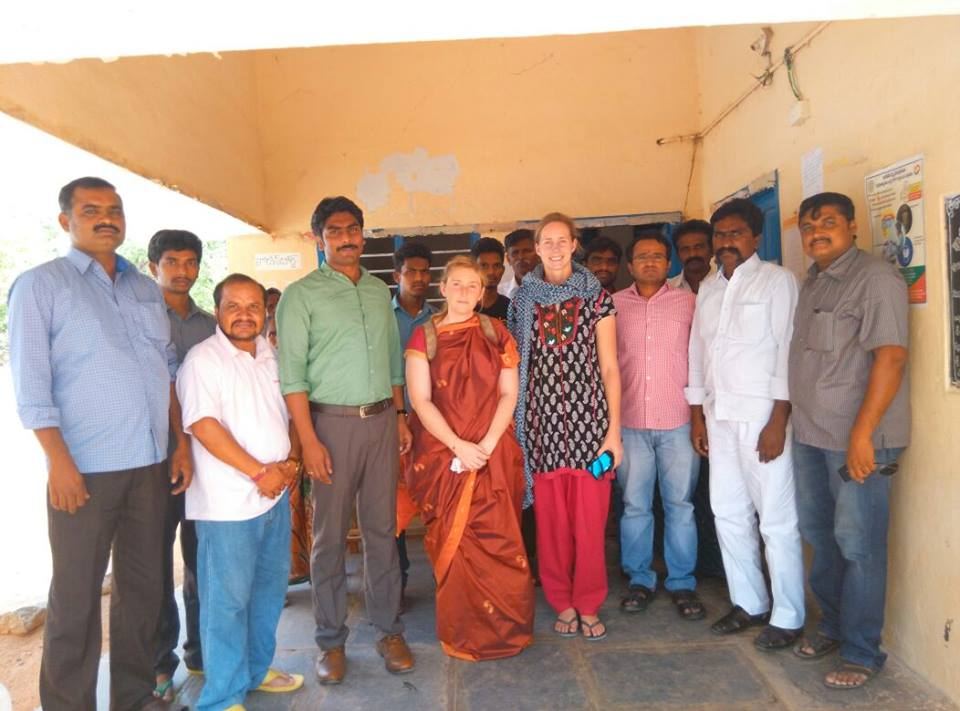
Different Meetings Held in Penchikal dinna

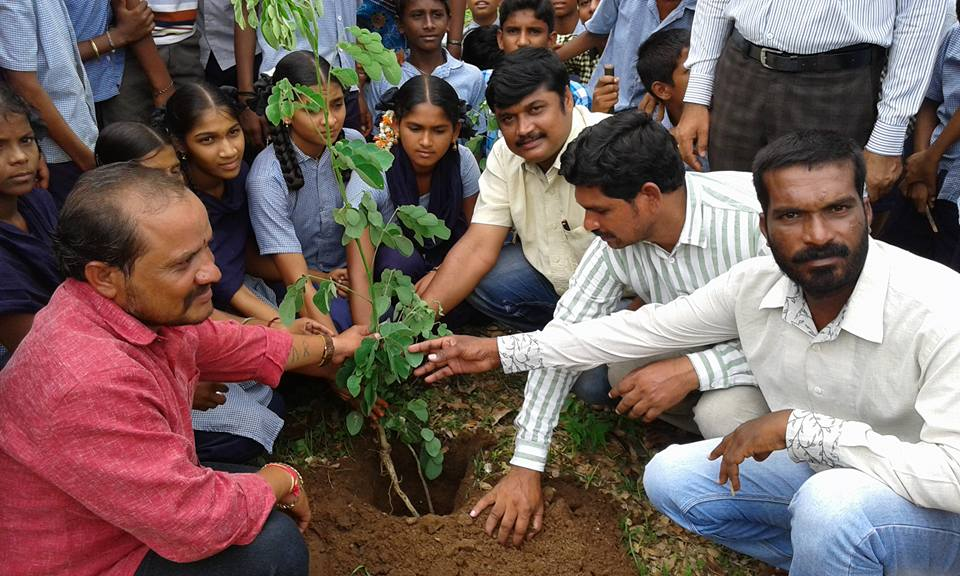
Planting Trees
