= Nandapuram =

- Village
- Country: India
- State: Telangana
- District: Suryapet

Languages
  - Official: Telugu
- Time zone: UTC+5:30 (IST)

Nandapuram is a village in Suryapet district of the Indian state of Telangana. It is located in Thirumalagiri mandal.
