= Malu (disambiguation) =

Malu is a type of Samoan tattoo.

Malu may also refer to:

== People ==
- Malú, Spanish singer María Lucía Sánchez Benítez (born 1982)
- Jonathan Malu (born 1993), basketball player
- Malu Dreyer (born 1961), German politician
- Malú Trevejo (born 2002), Cuban-American singer

== Places ==
=== Romania ===
- Malu, Giurgiu, a commune in Giurgiu County
- Malu, a village in Bârla Commune, Argeș County
- Malu, a village in Godeni Commune, Argeș County
- Malu, a village in Sfântu Gheorghe Commune, Ialomiţa County
- Malu, a village in Stoilești Commune, Vâlcea County

=== Elsewhere ===
- Malu, Queensland, a locality in Australia
- Malu, Shanghai, China
  - Malu Station, Shanghai Metro
- Malu, Nepal

== See also ==
- Malu Roșu (disambiguation)
- Malu Vânăt (disambiguation)
- Mallu
- Malu'u, a village in the Solomon Islands
