= Narsimhula Gudem =

- Village
- Location in Telangana, India Narsimhula Gudem (India)
- Coordinates: 17.1323833°N 79.8180557°E
- Country: India
- State: Telangana
- District: Suryapet

Languages
  - Official: Telugu
- Time zone: UTC+5:30 (IST)
- Telephone code: +91-
- Vehicle registration: TS 29

Narsimhula Gudem is one of the major Grampanchayat in Munagala mandal of Suryapet District, Telangana. As per the 2013/01/01 Election commission electoral list it has a population of around four thousand with 2165 registered voters of which Male voters are 1073 and Female 1092. It has a primary school and a High School where students enroll even from nearby villages like Repala, Jagannadhapuram, Vijaya Raghavapuram and Seethanaagaram, etc. This High school is located on the route between Narsimhula Gudem and Repala village, on the footsteps of Lord Laxmi Narimha Swamy temple.

Narsimhula Gudem, being part of the Munagala Estate, Elders had established Zameen Rytu Sangham in order to protect from the atrocities and exploitation of Zamindars. Zamindars had tried to scuttle the Rythu sangam by beating its leaders with his henchmen. Many revolts had occurred like Farmers Movement, Anti-Zamindary Movement, Tribal Movements etc. against the atrocities committed by the Zamindars. There were about 42 martyrs in the Munagala area.n arsimhulagudem one of the factions village in munagala mandal.

Narsimhula gudem people are give more importance to politics . The Major parties are Indian National Congress and CPIM .

== Martyrs of Narsimhula Gudem Village ==
Bandaru Venkaiah was born in an agricultural family. In 1946, he became the member of Communist Party and fought against Zamindar politics. In 1948, he joined in 'Armed Struggle'. He participated in many fights and at last he was killed by the police near the border of Telangana.

Somireddy Jaggaiah: He was a farmer and joined the Communist Party in 1946. In 1947, he participated in the anti-Zamindary struggle. In 1948, he joined in (Sayudha dalam). In 1948, he was killed by union army.

Pasam Gopaiah and Julakanti Buchaiah: These two members belong to farmer families and they led a secret life as revolutionist. They were caught by the police. Police insisted them to tell the secrets of their party and humiliated them and at last they were shot dead by the police.
