= Nagaram, Suryapet district =

Nagaram
- Location in Telangana, India
- Coordinates: 17°12′0″N 79°35′30″E
- Country: India
- State: Telangana
- District: Suryapet

Population (2011)
  - Total: 2,534

Languages
  - Official: Telugu
- Time zone: UTC+5:30 (Indian Standard Time)
- PIN: 508279
- Telephone code: 08683
- Vehicle registration: TS 29

Nagaram is a village in Suryapet district of Telangana, India. It is located in Nagaram mandal of Suryapet revenue division.
