= Potlapahad =

- Village
- Location in Potlapahad, Suryapet, Telangana, India
- Coordinates: 17.026111°N 79.683333°E
- Country: India
- State: Telangana
- District: Suryapet

Population (2011)
  - Total: 1,812

Languages
  - Official: Telugu
- Time zone: UTC+5:30 (IST)
- PIN: 508213
- Vehicle registration: TS 29

Potlapahad is a village in Penpahad mandal of Suryapet district in Telangana, India. It is located 22 km from district headquarters, Suryapet.

== Geography ==
It is in the 152 m elevation(altitude) .

== Demographics ==
Potlapahad has population of 1812 of which 900 are males while 912 are females as per Population Census 2011. The literacy rate of village was 64.87% where Male literacy stands at 74.37% while female literacy rate was 55.70%.

== Politics ==
It falls under Suryapet Assembly constituency and the village is administrated by Sarpanch.
