= Kalmalcheruvu =

- Village
- Country: India
- State: Telangana
- District: Suryapet

Government
  - Sarpanch: Bachalakuri Srinu

Population (2011)
  - Total: 5,265

Languages
  - Official: Telugu
- Time zone: UTC+5:30 (IST)
- Postal code: 508201
- Vehicle registration: TS 29
- Website: telangana.gov.in

Kalmalcheruvu is one of the largest villages in the Garidepally mandal, Suryapet district in Telangana, India. It is located 7 km from the Garidepalli. The village got its name from the lotus flowers ("Kaluvalu") in one of the two lakes ("Cheruvu") belonged to the village.

== Temples ==
- Venkateswaralayam (which is one of the oldest temples, which also have a "Shivlaya".
- Ramalayam, Ayyappa Swami Temple, Saibaba & Hanuman temple and construct the Narasimha Swamy temple and a Christian church & Mahjid.

== Schools ==
- Government high school and primary school.
- Private school also is there.

== Economy ==
The village mainly supports itself through agriculture, especially rice farming. There are three rice mills available in the village.

== Amenities ==
The usual amenities of village life are available, including small shops. Kalmalcheruvu has a Zilla Parishad (local government) high school, a primary school, and a private school. The government-run school is now more popular than the private school. The major government hospital for the region is located at the village.

The roads are now in not good condition. Only 1 buses serve the village that to at morning 4oClock. Proposed facilities for village improvement include a primary health care centre and a library.

The number of voters in the village is around 4,000. One of the major panchayat in Suryapet district.
