= Gorentla, Suryapet district =

Gorentla
- Village
- Country: India
- State: Telangana
- District: Suryapet
- Mandal: Maddirala

Population (2019)
  - Total: 3,899

Languages
  - Official: Telugu
- Time zone: UTC+5:30 (IST)

Gorentla is a village in Suryapet district of the Indian state of Telangana. It is located in Maddirala mandal.gorentla is one of the developing village in telangana state in a modernize way
