= Madhavaram, Telangana =

Madhavaram
- village
- Madhavaram, Telangana
- Coordinates: 17.093057°N 79.774961°E
- Country: India
- State: Telangana
- District: Suryapet

Government
  - Body: Village Panchayat
- Elevation: 391 m (1,283 ft)

Population
  - Total: 1,904

Languages
  - Official: Telugu
- Time zone: UTC+5:30 (IST)
- ISO 3166 code: IN-TS
- Vehicle registration: TS
- Nearest city: Suryapet
- Website: telangana.gov.in

Madhavaram, is a village in Munagala Taluk of Suryapet district in the state of Telangana in India.

Madhavaram located at a distance of 18km from Suryapet and 28km from kodad constituency. Madhavaram located on National Highway-65, which is earlier named as NH-9. It is one of the busiest 4 way national highway connecting Pune to Machilipatnam.

Madhavaram is one of the most accident prone black spot. Major reasons being black spot is due to curved roads and no service road for people to tress pass National highway. And some other rural road joins the national highway where NH is down sloping and vehicles go at high speeds.

Madhavaram known for agricultural cultivation of Rice, Cotton, Mango, Lemon, Red chilli, Dragon fruit, Fish, Red gram, Green gram, etc., Mostly panda are dependent on tube wells and pond water for irrigation.

nowadays some rural farmers are cultivating organic products here.

Madhavaram pond(cheruvu) is one of the biggest in the region occupies around 1000acres(250 hectares). Which located next to national highway and providing irrigation to thousands of acres. Common carp(Bangaru teega), katla (botcha), ravva, snake headed fishes are famous here.

Madhavaram has upper primary school with English as a medium of teaching, and one primary health clinic, post office.

pin-code is 508213.

== Demographics ==
Total Number of Household : 540
Population	Persons	Males	Females
Total	1,904	957	947
In the age group 0–6 years	191	98	93
Scheduled Castes (SC)	353	171	182
Scheduled Tribes (ST)	96	50	46
Literates	992	593	399
Illiterate	912	364	548
Total Worker	1,061	556	505
Main Worker	1,031	542	489
Main Worker - Cultivator	228	140	88
Main Worker - Agricultural Labourers	523	209	314
Main Worker - Household Industries	13	10	3
Main Worker - Other	267	183	84
Marginal Worker	30	14	16
Marginal Worker - Cultivator	4	2	2
Marginal Worker - Agriculture Labourers	13	4	9
Marginal Worker - Household Industries	0	0	0
Marginal Workers - Other	13	8	5
Marginal Worker (3-6 Months)	29	14	15
Marginal Worker - Cultivator (3-6 Months)	4	2	2
Marginal Worker - Agriculture Labourers (3-6 Months)	13	4	9
Marginal Worker - Household Industries (3-6 Months)	0	0	0
Marginal Worker - Other (3-6 Months)	12	8	4
Marginal Worker (0-3 Months)	1	0	1
Marginal Worker - Cultivator (0-3 Months)	0	0	0
Marginal Worker - Agriculture Labourers (0-3 Months)	0	0	0
Marginal Worker - Household Industries (0-3 Months)	0	0	0
Marginal Worker - Other Workers (0-3 Months)	1	0	1
Non Worker	843	401	442
