= Patharlapahad =

- Village
- Location within Telangana Location within India
- Coordinates: 17.290112°N 79.670212°E
- Country: India
- State: Telangana
- District: Suryapet

Government
  - Body: Gram panchayat
  - Sarpanch: Narayana Ganaparapu, Congress
  - Member of Legislative Assembly: G. Jagadeesh Reddy

Area
  - Total: 3 km^{2} (1.2 sq mi)

Population (2011)
  - Total: 4,205

Languages
  - Official: Telugu and Urdu
- Time zone: UTC+5:30 (IST)
- PIN: 508221
- Telephone code: 91–8684
- Avg. summer temperature: 40 °C (104 °F)
- Avg. winter temperature: 26 °C (79 °F)

Patharlapahad is a village in Athmakur (S) mandal, Suryapet district, state of Telangana, India. It is located along Suryapet and Warangal highway

== Geography and demographics ==
The village is spread across 3 km² and has total population of approximately 4205. The village possesses cultural diversity with Hindu's, Muslims and Christians. The literacy percentage of the village is 38%

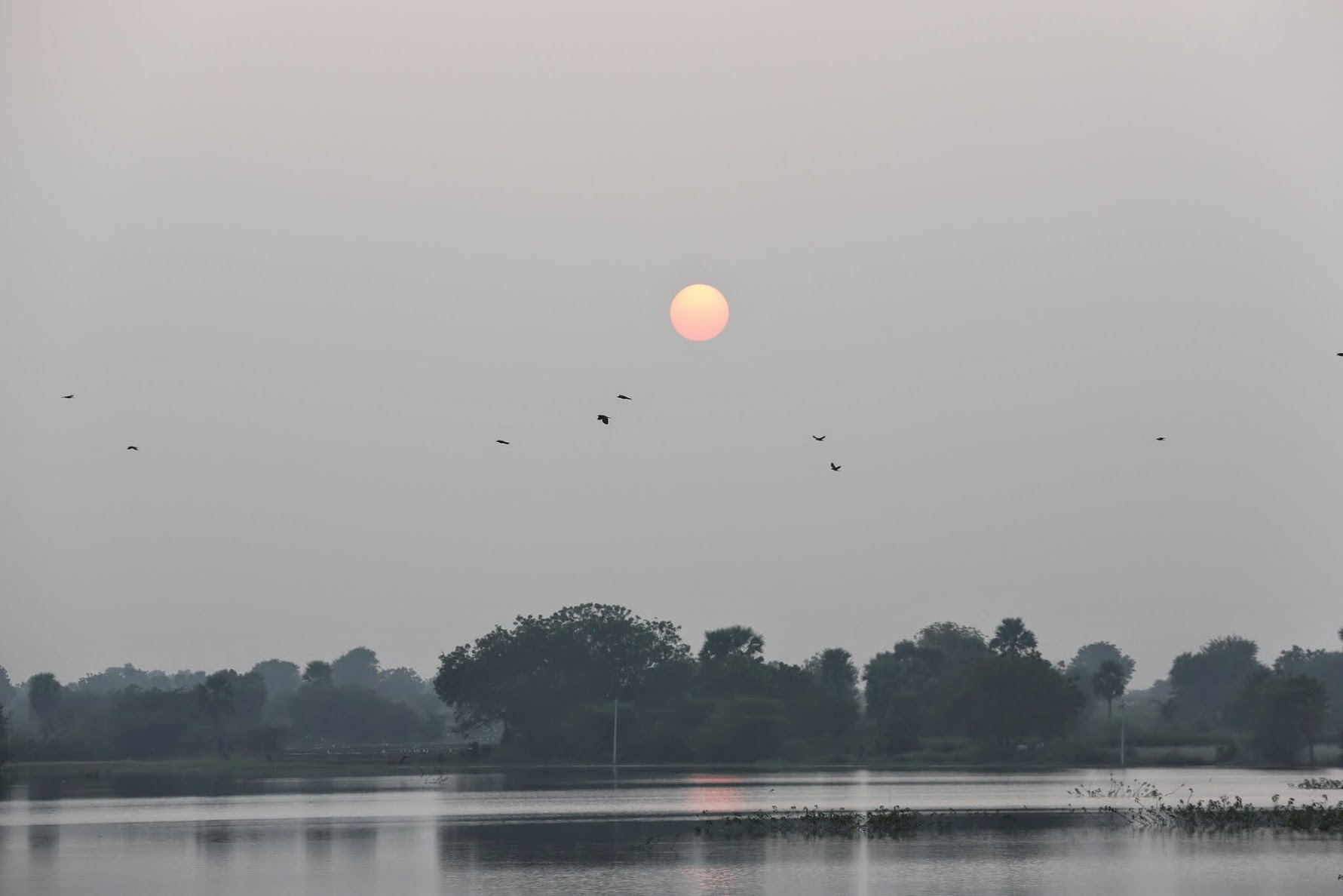
Shambuni Cheruvu

== History ==
The village, like many other villages in the district (and in Telangana), faced a major threat from "Rajakarulu", a private militia organized by Qasim Razvi to support the rule of Osman Ali Khan, Asaf Jah VII and resist the integration of Hyderabad State in India. Village citizens used to hide themselves in forest areas around the village to escape from killings of the Nizam Army. There are some notable persons who scarified their lives fighting against the army for freedom.

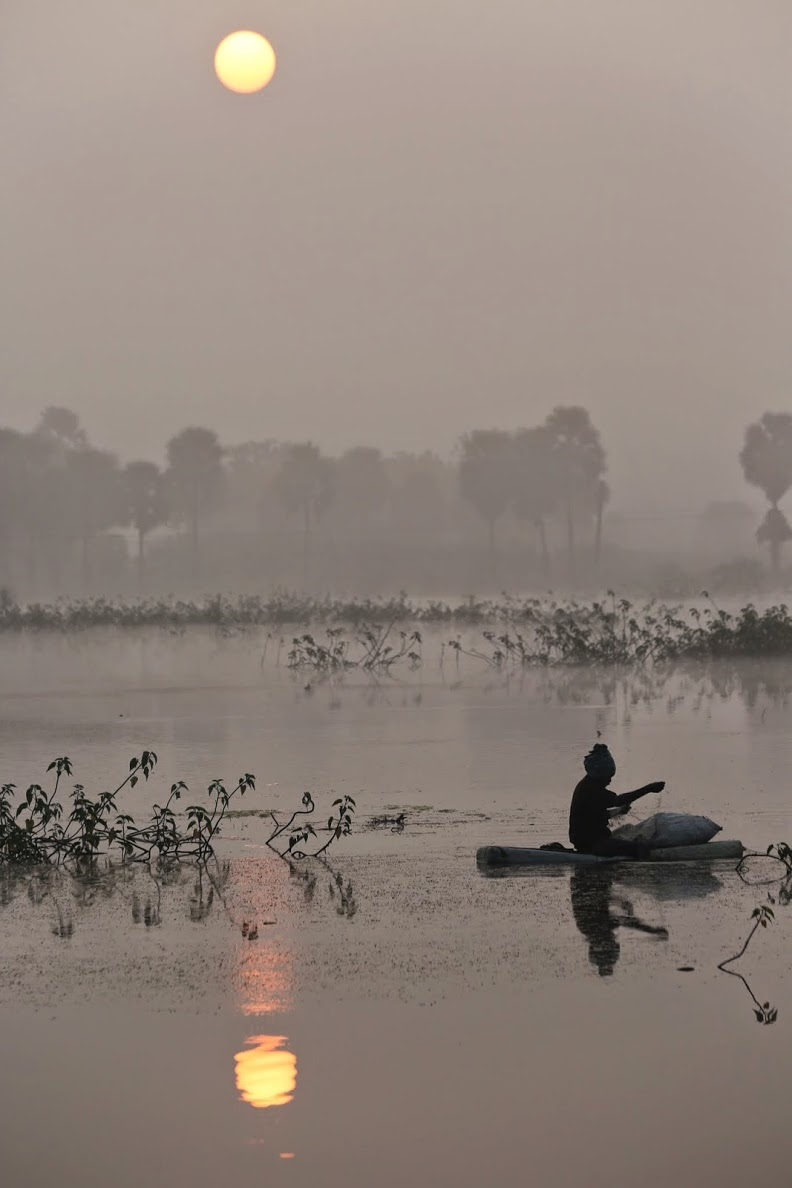
Sunrise over Lake Kotha Kunta

== Historical places ==
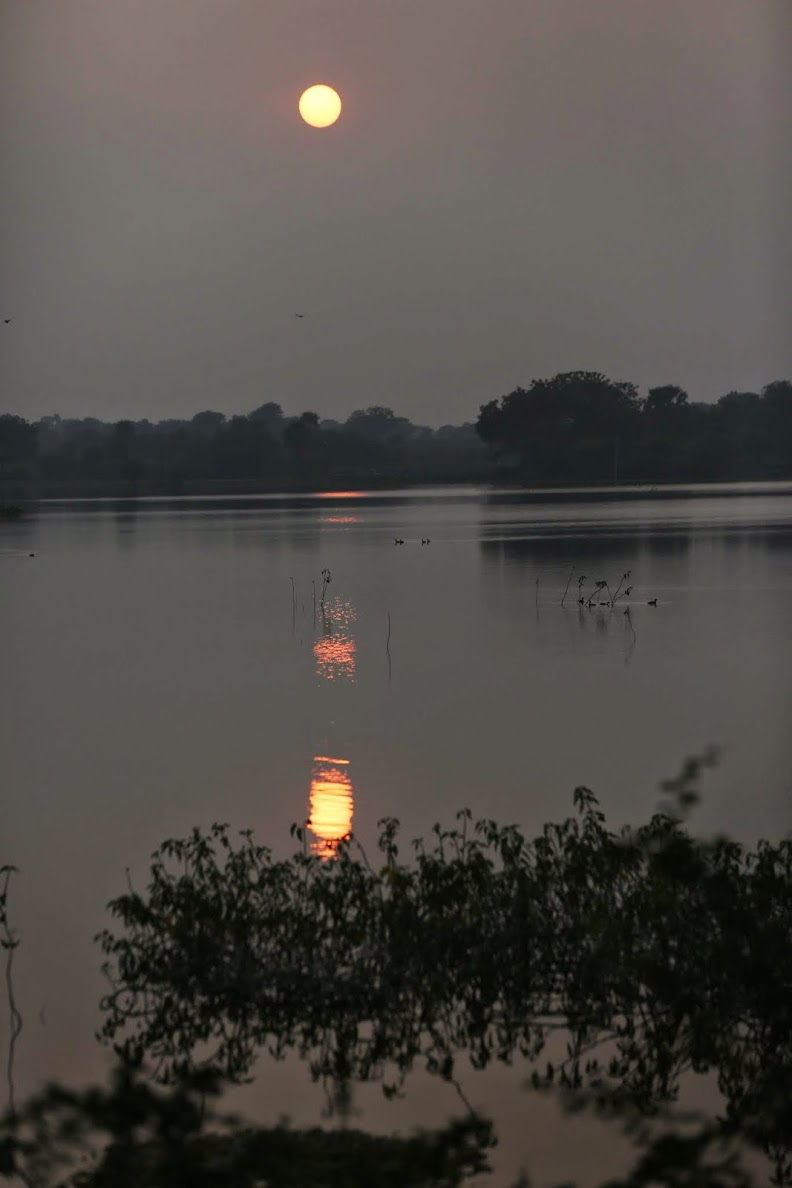
Sunset over Lake Shambuni Cheruvu

One of the historical places in the village is 'Shambhuni Gudi' (Shivalayam; a temple of Shiva), located on the banks of Shabhuni Cheruvu (a major reservoir of the village). The temple was constructed during the ruling of Rudrama Devi of the Kakatiya dynasty. The architectural style of the temple is characteristic of Shiva temples built by Kakatiya rulers. However, over a period of time, the temple was demolished and has never been recovered by Archeological department of India.

The other notable place is 'Anjaneya Swamy Gudi (Temple of Lord Hanuman who is a disciple of Lord Rama in the war against the demon king Ravana). The temple is located centrally in the village. It is part of the local custom and Hindu wedding ritual for newly wedded couples to visit the temple before they enter their home.

== Festivals and events ==
Village people actively celebrate most major festival of the Hindu religion - Sankranti, Ugadi, Diwali, Vijayadashami and Muslim festivals like Ramzan (Ramadan), Bakra Eid, Peerla Panduga (Muharram [(kanthama mahesheswraswamy festival) (it's a Gouds' famous festival)].

Every two years, the village hosts the major carnival called 'Gangadevamma Jathara', a festival that is celebrated by villagers that worship the Goddess Ganga (a.k.a. Ganges, personified as a goddess, worshiped by Hindus who believe that the prayers towards the goddess would bring more rain and water to the village). This festival includes people from surrounding villages who camp near the temple for few days and participate in the celebrations.

Every year the women in the village celebrate a Telangana traditional festival called Bathukamma.

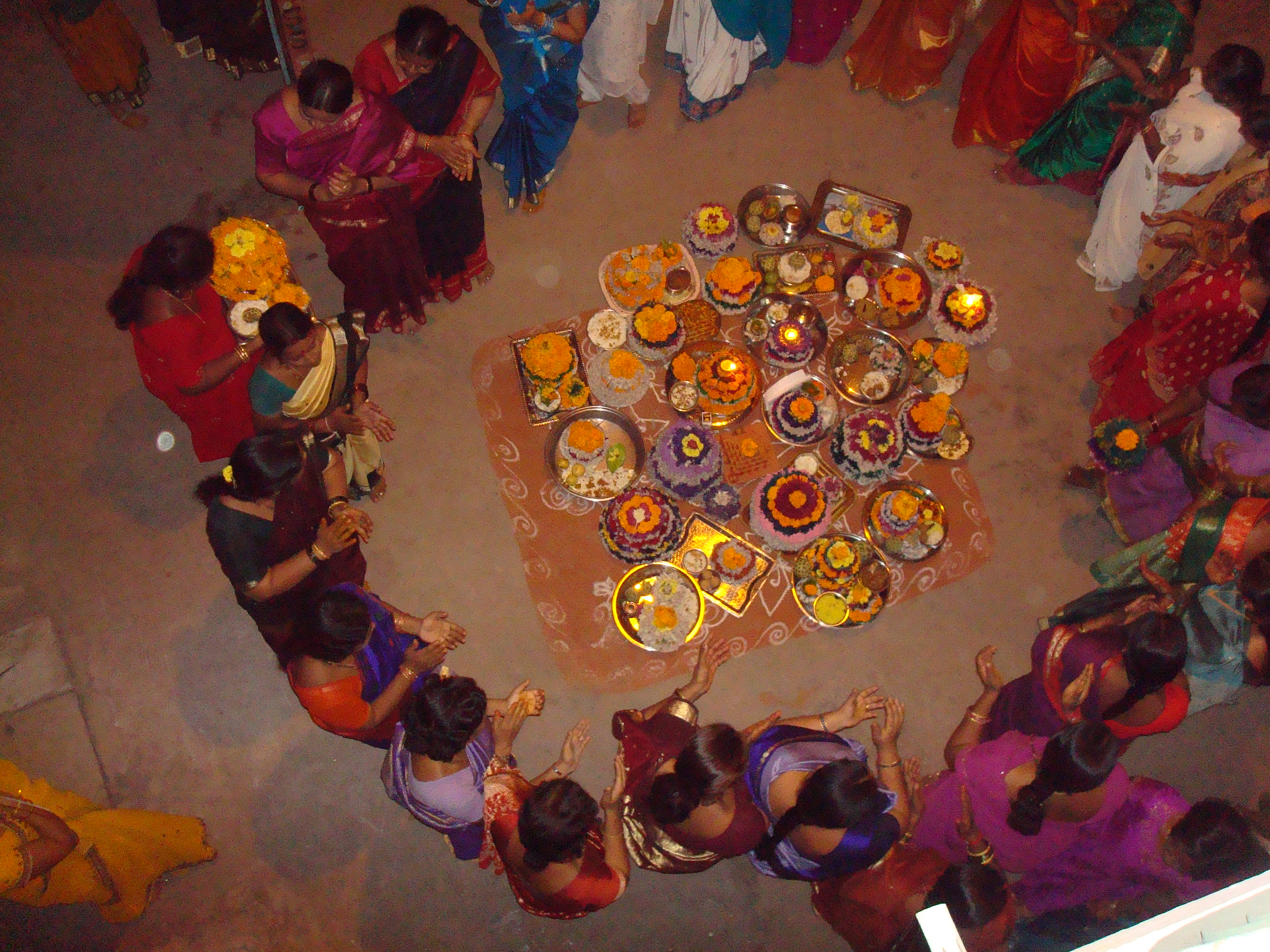
Women celebrating Bathukamma

Peerla Panduga is a Muslim festival that was enjoyed by all the people in the village irrespective of their religion.

== Agriculture and other occupations ==
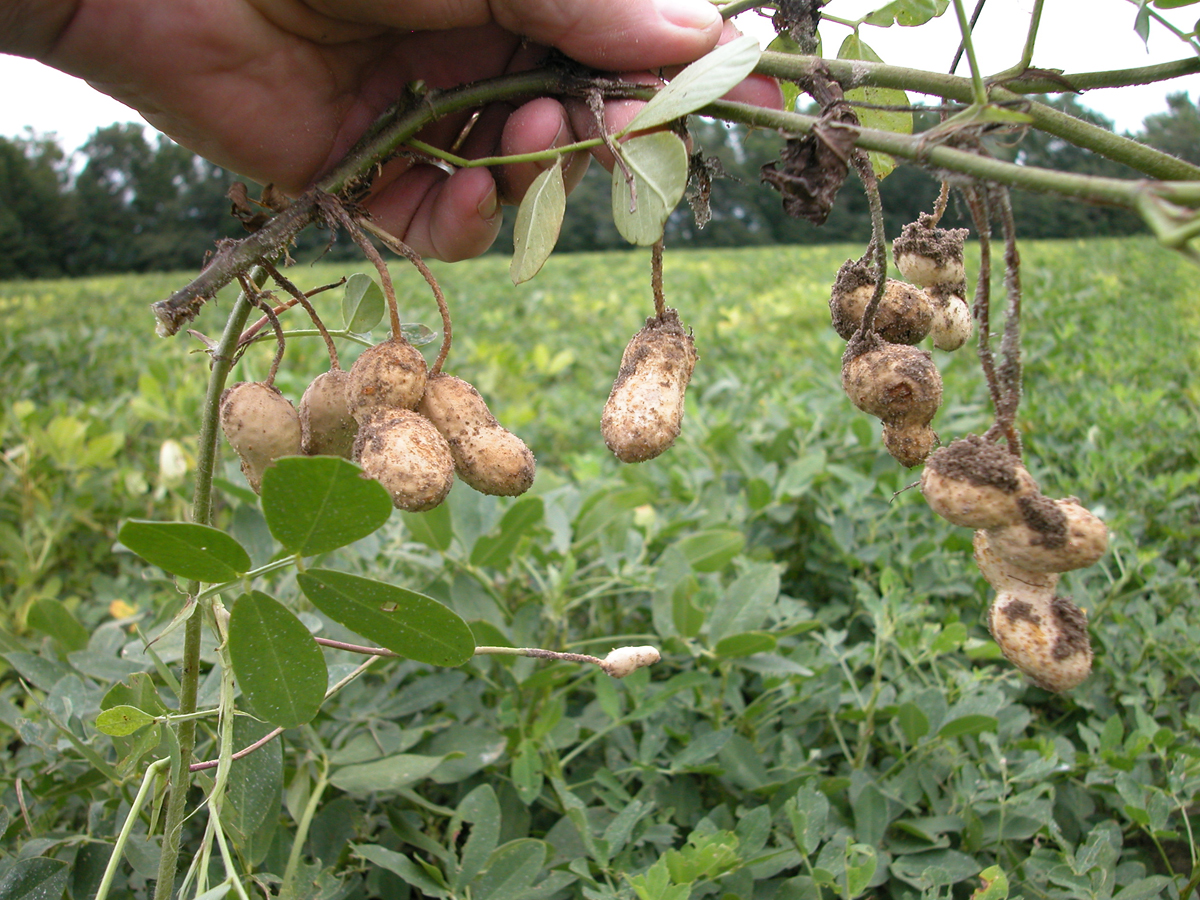
Freshly dug peanuts

The village is predominantly dependent on agriculture, the irrigation of which is dependent on rainfall. There are 4 major reservoirs located around the village for irrigation. They are - Shambhuni cheruvu (built by Rudrama Devi), Kotha Kunta, Ayyavaari Kunta, and Garu Kunta. There is also a small check dam built on a creek that passes by the village, which also serves as a source for irrigation. About 10,000 acres of land are cultivated each year. Crops that are grown include:paddy, peanuts, red chili, mung bean (also known as green gram or golden gram), pigeon pea (also known as yellow dal) and cotton. Lately, there has been the introduction of commercial crops: mangos, oranges, and others. The village is surrounded by more than ten Lambada Thandas (Banjara Thanda) that provide much of the agricultural labor.

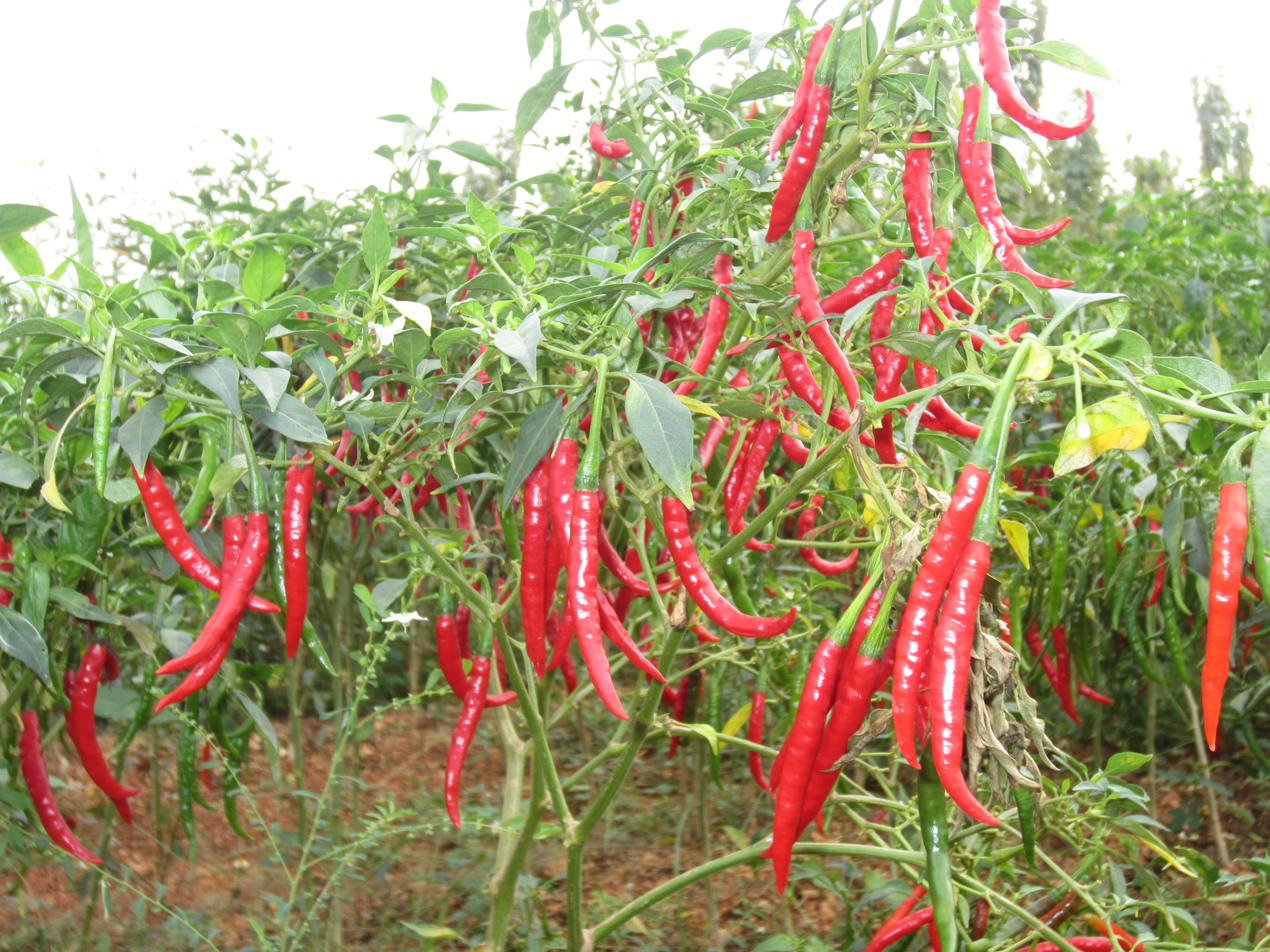
Red Chili crop

All the crops except cotton are marketed in Suryapet agriculture market yard. Cotton is usually sold in the Warangal market.

There are a significant number of people in the village who belongs to Golla or Yadav. Their traditional occupation has been rearing sheep, goats and cattle and selling them in nearby Angadi (Rural supermarkets in Telangana region). As did many Telangana region villages, had a weekly Angadi (every Saturday) until 1998. People relied on the angadi for their daily household goods. The angadis were an alternative supermarket concept for villages in most of the Telangana districts.

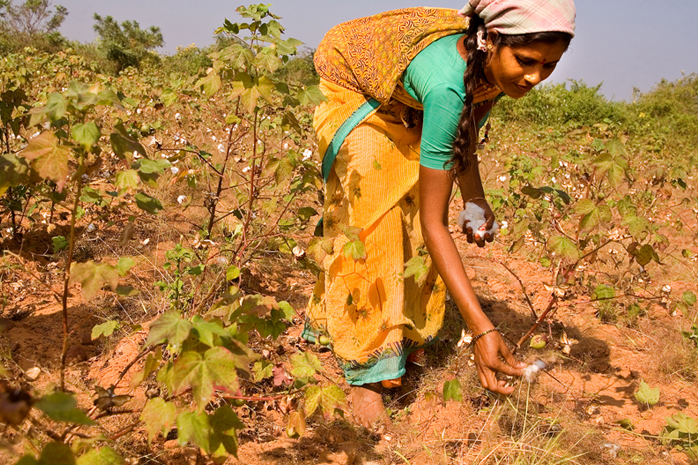
Cotton being picked by hand

In late 1980s, the village was famous for producing most Kallu. There are two main types of kallu produced: Thadi Kallu (from Toddy Palmyra trees) and Eetha Kallu (from silver date palms). Eetha Kallu is very sweet and less intoxicating, whereas Thati Kallu is stronger (sweet in the morning, becoming sour to bitter-sour in the evening) and is highly intoxicating. People enjoy kallu right at the trees where it is brought down. They drink from the leaves by holding them to their mouths while the Goud pours the kallu from the Kunda (kallu pot). There are different types of toddy (kallu) according to the season: 1. poddathadu, 2. parpudthadu, 3. pandudthadu, and 4. mogadthadu. A good portion of the village population (called Goud) rely on selling 'Kallu' for their living.

== Education and employment ==
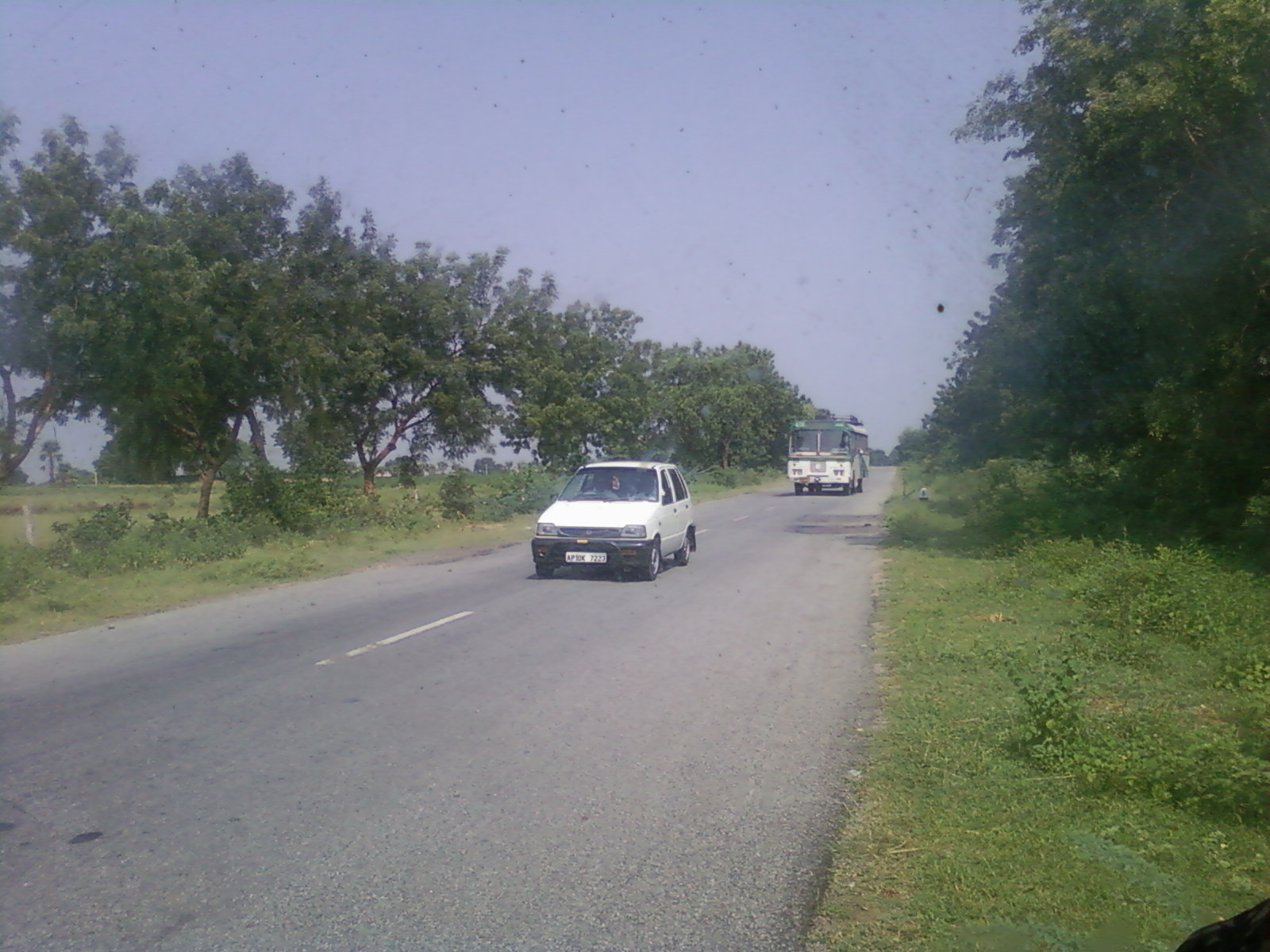
The road (Suryapet-Warangal Highway) connecting Patharlapahad

The village has a Zila Parishad school that educate the students up to tenth standard (SSC - Secondary School Certificate). Patharlapahad is notable in the district for educated talent who serves as employees in wide variety of professional occupations. The village is famous for producing the most number of teachers in the mandal. There are in the village presently 1 doctor, 205 government teachers, 12 engineers, 1 DSP 4 circle inspector of police, 4 sub-inspector of police and 6 constables.

Patharlapahad has a youth club named -Navodaya Youth Club. Under the authority of this club, the village used to host district level sports and cultural competitions.

== Politics ==
The Patharlapahad Government is a gram panchayat that consists of twelve wards. The Panchayath also includes wards from nearby Thandas. Main political parties are the Indian National Congress (INC) and the Telangana Rashtra Samithi (TRS). Since independence, the village has been governed predominantly by the INC party.
