= Velugupalli Annaram =

Annaram(T) Annaram
- village
- Country: India
- State: Telangana
- District: Suryapet

Population (2011)
  - Total: 4,290

Languages
  - Official: Telugu
- Time zone: UTC+5:30 (IST)
- PIN: 508280
- Telephone code: 08693
- Nearest city: Suryapet
- Literacy: 75%
- Lok Sabha constituency: Bhuvanagiri
- Vidhan Sabha constituency: Thungathurthy
- Climate: moderate (Köppen)

Annaram is a village in Thungathurthy mandal, Suryapet district, Telangana, India. Nearly 95% of population is literate.

== History ==
Annavaram is called Annaram. This village was once a small site for a group of inhabitants. At that time the name was "Velugu palli Annaram". Later it was renamed to its current name Annaram. This village has the traces of rich history. The elders and freedom fighters tells many stories about the village. Probably, this land was under the rule of the Kakatiya dynasty. Some old temples and remains of fortified walls and buildings can be found at Gutta which is located near government High school. This village has the active participation in the Telangana movement Razakar against Nizam rulers. One can find more than half a dozen Freedom Fighters in the villages. To enhance its name and its legacy, there are many another gems in the Annaram crown. The Temple of Rama, CSI and Baptist Church and Mosque (Maseed), Mutyalamma and Sounamma Temples are some of the religious places in the village.

== Demographics ==
The boundaries are Sangem to the east, Thungathurthy to the west, Karvilala Kothagudem to the north and Velugupalli to the south. The village is surrounded by four lakes: Turupu Erra Kumta to the east, Erra Kunta to the west, Sama cheruvu and Marri Kunta to the north, and Kothan Kunta, Sone Kunta and Bandam to the south. There are 8-10 notified lakes in the village and two guttas.

The population is approximately 5,000 to 5,500 and there are 3,100 voters in the village. It is a major gram panchayath and there are 12 panchayath wards. Apart from the village population, it has a population of approximately 1,000 from the hamlet villages Keshava Puram and Boda Banda

== Distances ==
Distance from various cities (approximately)

- Hyderabad (state capital) – 140 kilometres (87 mi)
- Suryapet (district HQ) – 35 kilometres (22 mi)
- Khammam – 80 kilometres (50 mi)
- Warangal – 90 kilometres (56 mi)

== Facilities ==
There are three government schools in the village, Zilla Parishad Primary School (since 1973), and Zilla Parishad High School and a government primary school.

The village has a PHC sub centre, post office, a water tank and one power sub-station.

== Transportation ==
Annaram is connected to the rest of the state and other districts by road. The Telangana State Road Transport Corporation runs a fleet of ten buses in the village. Annaram haa a bus station. Buses are available to various places, mainly to Hyderabad, Suryapet, and other parts of the state via different towns and villages of the region. The yellow colored auto rickshaw is the most widely used transport service and has a minimum fare of ₹ 6 to Mandal and ₹ 22 to Suryapet.

== Economy ==
Annaram's economy is predominantly agricultural with several traditional village industries. Agriculture is the main occupation. The main agricultural products of the village are rice, mung bean, ground nut, chilli and cotton.

== People ==
There are people from different religions – Hindu, Christian and Muslims. The famous festivals are Dasara, Bathukamma, Deepavali, Sankranti, Christmas, Ramjan, 26 January and 15 August.

== Sports ==
District level games are conducted in Annaram every year and people play cricket, volleyball and kabaddi.
