= Cheedella =

- Village
- Location in Cheedella, Suryapet, Telangana, India
- Coordinates: 17.026111°N 79.683333°E
- Country: India
- State: Telangana
- District: Suryapet

Population (2011)
  - Total: 5,943

Languages
  - Official: Telugu
- Time zone: UTC+5:30 (IST)
- PIN: 508233
- Vehicle registration: TS 29

Cheedella is a village in Penpahad mandal of Suryapet district in Telangana, India. It is located 33 km from district headquarters, Suryapet.

== Geography ==
It has an elevation of 153 m (502 ft) above mean sea level.

== Demographics ==
Cheedella is the most populated village in Penpahad mandal . It has population of 5943 of which 2986 are males while 2957 are females as per Population Census 2011. The literacy rate of village was 59.34% where Male literacy stands at 69.72% while female literacy rate was 48.78%.

== Politics ==
It falls under Suryapet Assembly constituency and the village is administrated by Sarpanch, who is elected representative of village.
