= Ponugode =

- village
- Country: India
- State: Telangana
- District: Suryapet

Population (2007)
  - Total: 20,000

Languages
  - Official: Telugu
- Time zone: UTC+5:30 (IST)
- Vehicle registration: TS-29

Ponugodu is a village in Garidepally mandal, in Suryapet district, Telangana state, India. It is 30 km from the district headquarters Suryapet.

The total population of the village is about 20,000 (2007) among which 55% are males. The number of voters in the village is around 15,000. Ramachandrapuram, Mallayyagudem, and Mangalagudem are sub-villages within Ponugodu.

== Temples ==
Temples in the village include Shivalayam (Thrilingeswaralayam), Venugopalaswamy temple, Ramalayam, and Christian church and a Mosque.

Every year people celebrate the kalyanam (marriage) of Shiva before the Maha Shivaratri and Venugopalswamy Kalyanam festivals in April or May, and Sita Rama Kalyanam on Rama Navami. The Thrilingeswaralayam was built by kakathiyas in the early 13th century. There is a subway from Thrilingeswaralayam to nagula bavi which is near the temple.

== Economy ==
The village is near the Nagarjuna-Sagar canal, and the village economy is based on rice cultivation. 90% of the economy of the village is from rice and daily wages. The village is surrounded by three tanks (ponds) which are the water source for rice paddies.

== Facilities ==
Ponugodu village has one Zilla Parishad (local government) high school, high school building was constructed from minster funds, inaugurated by Aliminati madhava reddy, school chairman was Nandipati Mattaiah (Known as Bodaiah), And there are three primary schools, and one private high school (Vidyodaya High School) right now it was closed.

There is 18-hour bus facility for the village from Suryapet and Miryalaguda for every 30 minutes. A two-lane blacktop road was recently constructed. Other facilities proposed for the village include a primary health care centre and a library. The village has St. Joseph's English Medium High School which has a hostel facility.
