= Suryapet (mandal) =

Suryapet mandal
- Mandal
- Location in Telangana, India Suryapet mandal (India)
- Coordinates: 17.1415°N 79.6236°E
- Country: India
- State: Telangana
- District: Suryapet
- Headquarters: Suryapet

Population (2011)
  - Total: 140,662

Languages
  - Official: Telugu, اردو
- Time zone: UTC+5:30 (IST)

Suryapet mandal is one of the 23 mandals in Suryapet district of the Indian state of Telangana. It is under the administration of Suryapet revenue division with its headquarters at Suryapet. The mandal is located on the banks of Musi river which separates it from Kethepally mandal and is bounded by Jajireddigudem, Athmakur (S), Chivvemla and Penpahad mandals. The density of population of the mandal is the highest of all the mandals in the district with 748.

== Towns and villages ==
As of 2011 census of India, the mandal has 19 settlements. It includes 1 city, 2 partial out growths and 16 villages.

The settlements in the mandal are listed below:

1. Balemla
2. Bechiragdacharam
3. Circlepet
4. Imampet
5. Kasarabad
6. Kesaram (rural) (OG)(part)
7. Konkathimmani
8. Pillalamarri (rural) (OG)(part)
9. Pinnaipalem
10. Ramachandrapuram
11. Ramannaguda
12. Ramavaram
13. Solipet
14. Suryapet (M) †
15. Tekumatla
16. Thalla
17. Venkatrampur
18. Yendlapalle
19. Yerkaram Khammampadu

Notes
(†) Mandal headquarter
