= Repala =

- Country: India
- State: Telangana
- District: Suryapet

Population (2011)
  - Total: 8,508

Languages
  - Official: Telugu
- Time zone: UTC+5:30 (IST)
- PIN: 508213
- Vehicle registration: TS 29
- Climate: hot (Köppen)
- Website: telangana.gov.in

Repala is a village under Munagala mandal in Suryapet district, Telangana. It is located at a distance of 5 km from National Highway 9. In between Suryapet and Kodada, there is a village Modhula Cheruvu, from here Repala is at a distance of 5 km.

The other route is between Suryapet and Khammam there is a village named Mothey, from there Repala is around 9 km.

The Sri Laxmi Narasimha Swamy Temple is located at Repala village. The temple has a history of over 400 years. The ancient temple gives much pleasure to the devotees. Every year Brahmotsavams will be held in the month of March.

In the Kings time Repala is the headquarter for the ruling of all the villages around it. Nearly 40 villages are ruled from here. Population of the village is around 1500.
