= Chanupally =

- village
- Location in Telangana, India Chanupally (India)
- Coordinates: 17.0600°N 79.3°E
- Country: India
- State: Telangana
- District: Suryapet
- Talukas: kodad
- Elevation: 17.0700 m (56.004 ft)

Population (2012)
  - Total: 1,300

Languages
  - Official: Telugu
- Time zone: UTC+5:30 (IST)
- PIN: 508206
- Telephone code: 08683
- Vehicle registration: TS
- Website: telangana.gov.in

Chanupally is a village and Gram panchayat of Ananthagiri mandal, Suryapet district, in Telangana state.
