= Kokkireni =

Coordinates: 16°59′N 79°47′E

Kokkireni is a village in Munagala Mandal, Suryapet district, Telangana, India.

== Demographics ==
Per the 2011 Census of India, Kokkireni has a total population of 2261; of whom 1147 are male and 1114 female.
