= Mallu Venkata Narasimha Reddy =

- Born: 18 May 1930; Mamillamadava, Hyderabad State, British Raj
- Died: 4 December 2004 (aged 74)
- Spouse: Mallu Swarajyam

Mallu Venkata Narasimha Reddy was an Indian revolutionary leader and one of the prominent heroes of the Telangana Rebellion. Remained underground for nine long years, he had organised the armed squads in battling the Nizam's army and the razakars. He steadfastly upheld the revolutionary tenets of Marxism–Leninism and played an important role when both the revisionist and the Left adventurist divisions had deeply divided the communist movement in Andhra Pradesh.

As the district secretary of Nalgonda, he played a pivotal role in the Telangana armed struggle. Comrade Narasimha Reddy built the Party and its mass organisations to emerge as the leading Left force in the district and in the state. After India's independence in 1947, he played an important role in pressuring the Nizam of Hyderabad to join independent India.

Though born in a rich peasant family which had close links with the landlords of the region. Narasimha gave up this family background to join the armed struggle and the subsequent class struggles in Andhra Pradesh. Having embraced Marxism and the communist outlook, he lived a simple life all through and continuously served the interests of the people without any compromise. He married Mallu Swarajyam, a CIP (M) leader and former legislator.

Mallu Venkata Narasimha Reddy was a participant in the armed struggle against the rule of Nizam, the last ruler of the erstwhile princely state of Hyderabad, of which the Telangana Rebellion formed a part.
