= Malu Roșu =

Malu Roșu may refer to several villages in Romania:

- Malu Roșu, a village in Armășești Commune, Ialomița County
- Malu Roșu, a village in Mărunței Commune, Olt County
- Malu Roșu, a village in Ceptura Commune, Prahova County

== See also ==
- Malu (disambiguation)
