= Aldas Janaiah =

Scientist, economist

- Born: 2 May 1964 (age 62); Mamidala, India

Dr. Aldas Janaiah is an Indian senior scientist and economist who did extensive research on socio-economic and policy issues related to technological developments, adoption and its impacts in South Asia and SE Asia.

Prof. Aldas Janaiah was appointed as Vice Chancellor for Prof. Jayashankar Telangana State Agricultural University, Hyderabad on 18 October 2024. He is well known for various research articles in Hybrid Rice for Indian farmers, Hybrid Rice for Tomorrows Food Security, agricultural diversification in favour of non-traditional and high nutrient value food crops and Genetically Modified food crops. He is also a frequent presenter at various national and international conferences.

== Family and education ==
Janaiah was born in agriculturist family on 2 May 1964 to Aldas Janamma and Aldas Saidulu Goud in Mamidala village of Thipparthy Mandal in Nalgonda district of Telangana in India.

He did his BSc in (agriculture) in 1987 and MSc in (agricultural economics) in 1989 from Acharya N. G. Ranga Agricultural University, PhD in (agricultural economics) in 1995 from Banaras Hindu University

== Career and assignments ==
- He joined as a scientist (agricultural economics) at Indian Council of Agricultural Research in 1991 until 2005.
- He was as a project scientist and post doctoral fellow at the International Rice Research Institute, Los Banos, The Philippines between 1999 and 2002.
- Visiting Fellow at Indira Gandhi Institute of Development Research between 2002 and 2004.
- Visiting Professor at the Vietnam Agricultural Science Institute to deliver Lectures on "The Irrigation & Technology Impacts on Rural Livelihood in Vietnam" in 2004.
- International Team Leader for the World Bank-Asian Development Bank Joint Project "Assessing the Poverty Impacts of Public Expenditures in Irrigation in Vietnam" between 2002 and 2004
- Member of Experts Group on Green Revolution Initiative in Africa, The United Nations Economic Commission for Africa (UNECA), Addis Ababa, Ethiopia between 2003 and 2005.
- Convenor of South Asia Regional Conference (SARC) of International Association of Agricultural Economists from 2005
- * He appointed as vice chancellor of Prof. Jayashankar Telangana State Agricultural University, Hyderabad on 18 October 2024 by Governor of Telangana

.

== Awards ==
- Best Scientist Award in 2002 from International Rice Research Institute in 2002 for outstanding contributions in the field of Rice Policy Analysis across Asia.

== Research projects ==
- The comparative economics and adoption behavior of hybrid rice technology in India.
- Analysis of the seed system and seed policy for rice in Bangladesh.
- The productivity impacts of green revolution in cereal crops in India.
- Impacts of modern farm technologies on poverty and income distribution in rural Asia
- Economic evaluation of the farm-level impacts of hybrid rice technology in tropical Asia

== Publications ==
- Aldas Janaiah, "Hybrid Rice for Indian Farmers : Myths and Reality", Economic and Political Weekly, 2002,42(37):4328
- Aldas Janaiah, "Hybrid Rice For Tomorrow Food Security:", Economic and Political Weekly, 2002,1(31)
- Aldas Janaiah, "Vietnam Experience in Hybrid Rice", Economic and Political Weekly, 2003,25(38):2529
- Aldas Janaiah, "Hybrid Rice in Bangladesh:Farm-Level Performance", Economic and Political Weekly, 2003,25(38):2552
- Aldas Janaiah, "Hybrid Rice in Andhra Pradesh:Findings of a survey", Economic and Political Weekly, 2003,25(38):2512
- Aldas Janaiah, "Hybrid Rice Cultivation in the Philippines: Early Level Experiences", Economic and Political Weekly, 2003,25(38):2508
- Aldas Janaiah, "Can Hybrid Rice Technology help Productivity Groeth in Asian Tropics?Farmers' Experience", Economic and Political Weekly, 2003,25(38):2501
- Aldas Janaiah, "The Seed Delivery System in Andhra Pradesh", Indian Journal of Agricultural Marketing, 2003,2(17)
- Aldas Janaiah, "Partnership in the Public Sector Agricultural R&D:Evidence from India", Economic and Political Weekly, 2004,50(39):5334
- Aldas Janaiah, "Has the Green Revolution Bypassed Coarse Cereals? The Indian Experience", Economic and Political Weekly, 2004,1(2):31
