= Chivvemla =

- Location in Telangana, India Chivvemla (India)
- Coordinates: 17°09′10″N 79°41′10″E
- Country: India
- State: Telangana
- District: Suryapet

Area
  - Total: 16.83 km^{2} (6.50 sq mi)

Population (2011)
  - Total: 8,016
  - Density: 476.3/km^{2} (1,234/sq mi)

Languages
  - Official: Telugu
- Time zone: UTC+5:30 (IST)
- PIN: 508213
- Telephone code: 08684
- Vehicle registration: TS-29
- Nearest city: Suryapet

Chivemla is a village in Suryapet district of the Indian state of Telangana. It is located Chivvemla mandal of Suryapet division.
