= Mothey mandal =

Mothey mandal మోతే మండలం
- Mandal
- Location in Telangana, India
- Coordinates: 17.1667°N 79.8000°E
- Country: India
- State: Telangana
- District: Suryapet
- Headquarters: Mothey

Population (2011)
  - Total: 42,680

Languages
  - Official: Telugu
- Time zone: UTC+5:30 (IST)
- PIN: 508212
- Vehicle registration: TS 29

Mothey mandal is one of the 23 mandals in Suryapet district of the Indian state of Telangana. It is under the administration of Suryapet revenue division with its headquarters at Mothey. It is bounded by Nadigudem Mandal towards South, Chivvemla Mandal towards west, Munagala mandal towards South, Atmakur(S) Mandal towards west and Khammam district towards east.

== Demographics ==
Mothey mandal is having a population of 42,680 living in 10,095 Houses. Males are 21,607 and Females are 21,073. Singarneni Palle is the smallest Village and Sirikonda is the biggest Village in the mandal.

== Villages ==
As of 2011 census of India, the mandal has 17 settlements. The settlements in the mandal are listed below:

1. Mothey (CT) †
2. Sarvaram
3. Urlugonda
4. Nereduvai
5. Annariguda
6. Burkacherla
7. Raavipahad
8. Vibhalapuram
9. Singarenipalli
10. Gopalapuram
11. Mamillagudem
12. Thummalapalli
13. Sirikonda
14. Hussenabad
15. Raghavapuram
16. Namaram
17. Kudali

Notes
(†) Mandal headquarter
