= Mamidala =

Mamidala Mamidala
- town
- Country: India
- State: Telangana
- District: Suryapet

Languages
  - Official: Telugu
- Time zone: UTC+5:30 (IST)
- Postal code: 508223
- Vehicle registration: TS 29
- Website: telangana.gov.in

Mamidala is a village in Tirumalagiri mandal of Suryapet district, Telangana, India.

Eminent Agricultural scientist Aldas Janaiah and Prof. M Jagadesh Kumar were born in this village.

== Demographics ==
According to Indian census, 2001, the demographic details of this village is as follows:

- Total Population: 5,173 in 1,216 Households.
- Male Population: 2,589
- Female Population: 2,584
- Children Under 6-years: 707 (Boys Under 6 Yrs: 365 and Girls Under 6 Yrs: 342)
- Total Literates: 2,104
