= Garidepally =

- Census town
- Location in Garidepally, Suryapet, Telangana, India
- Coordinates: 16.9228223°N 79.7827148°E
- Country: India
- State: Telangana
- District: Suryapet

Population (2011)
  - Total: 10,386

Languages
  - Official: Telugu
- Time zone: UTC+5:30 (IST)
- PIN: 508201
- Telephone code: 08683
- Vehicle registration: TS-29

Garidepally is a census town in the Suryapet district of Telangana, India. It is the headquarters of the Garidepally mandal of the Suryapet revenue division. It is located 33 kilometres from its district headquarters in Suryapet.

== Geography ==
Garidepally has a land elevation of 112 m (367 ft).

== Demographics ==
Garidepally has a population of 10,836, composed of 5,419 women and 5,417 men based on the 2011 Census of India. The literacy rate of the village as of 2011 was 64.81 %, whereas male literacy stands at 74.62 % and female literacy rate is 55.08 %.

== Politics ==
Garidepally is represented by the Huzurnagar Assembly constituency and the village is administrated by a Sarpanch, who is elected by residents of the village.

== Temples ==
Garidepally is a location of many temples, such as the famous Ramalayam Temple, Hanuman temple, Shri Ramalingeshwara Temple, Shri Dharmashstra Ayyappa temple, Sai Baba Temple and the temple of Lord Venkateshara.

== Agriculture ==
Most of the people in this village are dependent on paddy crop cultivation.
