= Madhavarayunigudem =

Madhavarayanigudem Madhavarayani Gudem, MadireniGudem, Madhavarayunigudem
- sub-census village
- Nickname: MRG
- Location in Telangana, India Madhavarayanigudem (India)
- Coordinates: 16°54′N 79°53′E
- Country: India
- State: Telangana
- District: Suryapet
- Block: Huzurnagar

Population (2009)
  - Total: 1,712

Languages
  - Official: Telugu
- Time zone: UTC+5:30 (IST)

Madhavarayanigudem is a village in the Huzurnagar mandal of Suryapet district, Telangana state. It is located 1 km off the Huzurnagar-Kodad road.

== History ==
The village was established in the late 19th century. It was named after velama dora Madhava Rayudu. It has several temples dedicated to Hanuman, Mutyallamma and Ganga. It also has a church.

== Economy ==
Agriculture is the main occupation of Madhavarayunigudem, with rice being the main crop. During droughts, crops like corn and vegetables are also cultivated. The Sagar canal, a sub-canal of the Nagarjuna Sagar's left canal, provides the village with irrigation water.

The village is surrounded by hills, which are being exploited as a source of concrete mixture stone.

== Education ==
Madhavarayunigudem has a primary school, which offers education up to 7th class. Most of the village children attend private schools in Huzurnagar or Upper school in Karakkayala Gudem.

== Demographics ==
The main castes and communities in the village include Telaga, Velama, Yadava (Golla), Mala, Madiga, Chakali, Kamsali and Muslims. The people in this village celebrate all major festivals specially Vinayaka Chavithi, Sri Rama navami, Bathukamma, Ramzan, Christmas festivals.

== Transport ==
The government bus service doesn't serve the village. It is located 3 km from Huzurnagar, where most of its residents work and study.

== Administration ==
The village was earlier administered by the Huzurnagar gram panchayat. In 2014, when Huzurnagar became a municipality, Madhavarayunigudem became its biggest ward.
