= Thungathurthy =

- Village
- National Highway 365
- Location in Telangana, India Thungathurthy (India)
- Coordinates: 17°27′24″N 79°37′33″E
- Country: India
- State: Telangana
- District: Suryapet

Area
  - Total: 25.08 km^{2} (9.68 sq mi)

Population (2015)
  - Total: 10,379
  - Density: 413.8/km^{2} (1,072/sq mi)

Languages
  - Official: Telugu, Urdu, Hindi
- Time zone: UTC+5:30 (IST)
- PIN: 508280
- Telephone code: 08693
- Vehicle registration: TS–29
- Website: telangana.gov.in

Thungathurthy is a village in Suryapet district of the Indian state of Telangana. It is located in Thungathurthy mandal of Suryapet Revenue Division. It is about 42 km from the district headquarters Suryapet.

Historically, Thungathurty has a significance of being the earliest region to ascend to the Indian Union. Pre-Independence, the region remained independent of its Nizam rule and British influence. Primarily due to the weather and the then ruling Recherla Reddy's who ensured diplomacy enabled the agrarian region deem free from tax of nizams and British.

Notable figures from the village include Mandadi Prabhakar Reddy, an actor who predominantly worked in the Telugu film industry. Mandadi Jagadishwar Reddy, a philanthropist and activist, also hailed from this village.
