= Thirumalagiri, Suryapet district =

Thirumalagiri Thonda Thirumalagiri
- Town
- Location in Telangana, India Thirumalagiri (India)
- Coordinates: 17.426953°N 79.472444°E
- Country: India
- State: Telangana
- District: Suryapet

Area
  - Total: 22.77 km^{2} (8.79 sq mi)

Population (2011)
  - Total: 18,474
  - Density: 811.3/km^{2} (2,101/sq mi)

Languages
  - Official: Telugu
- Time zone: UTC+5:30 (IST)
- Vehicle registration: TS 29

Tirumalagiri is a new municipality and 5th largest town in Suryapet district of the Indian state of Telangana. It is located in Thirumalagiri mandal of Suryapet division.
