= Professor Jayashankar Telangana State Agricultural University =

Agricultural school in Hyderabad, India

Professor Jayashankar Telangana Agricultural University
- Type: Agricultural University
- Established: 2014; 12 years ago
- Affiliations: UGC
- Chancellor: Governor of Telangana
- Vice-Chancellor: Aldas Janaiah
- Location: Rajendranagar, Hyderabad, Telangana, India; 17°19′17.44″N 78°24′35.32″E
- Campus: Urban
- Website: www.pjtsau.edu.in

The Professor Jayashankar Telangana Agricultural University (PJTSAU) is a state agriculture university, which was separated from the central Acharya N. G. Ranga Agricultural University in the year 2014 as a result of the bifurcation of Andhra Pradesh.

== Headquarters and Colleges ==
The university has its headquarters at Rajendranagar, Hyderabad.

It has the following colleges:

UG Course: B.Sc. (Hons) Agriculture

1. College of Agriculture, Rajendranagar, Hyderabad
  - ICAR accredited with an A Grade.
2. Agricultural College, Aswaraopet, Bhadradri Kothagudem District
  - ICAR accredited with an A Grade.
3. Agricultural College, Jagtial District
  - ICAR accredited with an A Grade.
4. Agricultural College, Palem, Nagarkurnool District
  - ICAR accredited with an A Grade.
5. Agricultural College, Warangal District
  - ICAR accredited with an A Grade.
6. BJR Agricultural College, Sircilla District
  - ICAR accredited with an A Grade.
7. Agricultural College, Adilabad District
  - Newly established during the academic year 2023–24.
8. Agricultural College, Tornala, Siddipet District
  - Newly established during the academic year 2023–24.

Faculty of Agricultural Engineering

UG Course: B.Tech. (Agricultural Engineering)

1 College of Agricultural Engineering, Kandi, Sangareddy dist. (ICAR accredited with A Grade).

UG Course: B.Tech. (Food Technology)

1 College of Food Science & Technology, Rudrur, Nizamabad dist. (ICAR accredited with A Grade). Faculty of Community Science

UG Course: B.Sc. (Hons) Community Science

1 College of Community Science, Saifabad, Hyderabad. (ICAR accredited with A Grade)

== History ==
The university was established on 12 June 1964, with O.Pulla Reddy as the first vice-chancellor. It was formally inaugurated on 20 March 1965, by Lal Bahadur Shastri, the then Prime Minister of India in Hyderabad. On 23 June 1966, another milestone was the inauguration of the building program of the university by Indira Gandhi, the then Prime Minister of India.

Post bifurcation of Andhra Pradesh, it was renamed as Professor Jayashankar Telangana State Agricultural University and the headquarters of Acharya N. G. Ranga Agricultural University was shifted from Hyderabad to Guntur.

According to the Andhra Pradesh Agricultural University Act, 1963, Colleges of Agriculture and Veterinary Science, Hyderabad (affiliated to Osmania University), Agricultural College, Bapatala (affiliated to Andhra University), Sri Venkateswara Agricultural College and Andhra Veterinary College, Tirupati (affiliated to Sri Venkateswara University) were transferred to the new university in June 1964. About 41 agricultural research stations and four research stations were transferred to the university in July 1966 and May 1967, respectively.
