= Kapugallu =

Coordinates: 16°56′N 79°59′E

Kapugallu Sarveswara Puram
- Village
- Interactive map of Kapugallu
- Country: India
- State: Telangana
- District: Suryapet

Population (2012)
  - Total: 7,000

Languages
  - Official: Telugu
- Time zone: UTC+5:30 (IST)
- PIN: 508238
- Telephone code: 08683
- Vehicle registration: TS 29
- Nearest city: Kodad
- Literacy: 70%
- Lok Sabha constituency: Suryapet
- Vidhan Sabha constituency: kodad
- Website: www.kapugallu.com, www.facebook.com/Kapugallu

Kapugallu is one of the largest gram panchayats under Kodad Municipality in the Suryapet district of Telangana, India.
