= Neredcherla =

- Location in Telangana, India
- Coordinates: 16.8321°N 79.4356°E
- Country: India
- State: Telangana
- District: Suryapet

Government
  - Type: Municipality

Population (2011)
  - Total: 25,678

Languages
- Time zone: UTC+5:30 (Indian Standard Time)
- PIN: 508218
- Telephone code: 08683
- Vehicle registration: TS 29
- Website: http://www.oldnereducharla.com/

Nereducharla is a new municipality and 4th largest town in Suryapet district of Telangana, India. It is located in Neredcherla mandal of Suryapet revenue division. It is about 38 km from the district headquarters Suryapet.
