= Malu Vânăt =

Malu Vânăt may refer to several villages in Romania:

- Malu Vânăt, a village in Merișani Commune, Argeș County
- Malu Vânăt, a village in Izvoarele Commune, Prahova County

== See also ==
- Malu (disambiguation)
