= Jan Pahad Dargah =

Coordinates: 16°43′43″N 79°42′23″E

Jan Pahad Saidulu Dargah is a dargah situated in Palakeedu Mandal in Suryapet district in Telangana, India. People from different religious faiths visit the holy shrine on the occasion of the annual Urs festival.

The dargah is built on the tomb of saint Mohinuddin alias Shaheed and Jan Pahad Saidulu. Qawwali, Sandal Sharif ceremonial procession and other special rituals mark the Urs festivities.

Route : 20 km distance from Nereducharla Mandal Headquarters. And another route from Miryalaguda Via Damaracherla ( Damaracherla is on Addanki - Narketpally State Highway) . Janapahad Dargah is 9 km away from Damaracherla. Autos and buses are available from Neredcharla and Damarcharla.
