= Balemla =

- village
- Location in Telangana, India
- Coordinates: 17°12′0″N 79°35′30″E
- Country: India
- State: Telangana
- District: Suryapet

Languages
  - Official: Telugu
- Time zone: UTC+5:30 (IST)
- PIN: 508376
- Telephone code: 9010576807
- Vehicle registration: TS-29
- Nearest city: Suryapet
- Lok Sabha constituency: Suryapet

Balemla is a village situated in Suryapet district of Telangana, India. It is located 10 km from district headquarters Suryapet.

== Education ==
Arvindaksha School of Engineering & Technology and Arvindaksha College of Pharmacy is situated in the village.
