= Mallu Swarajyam =

Indian politician (1931–2022)

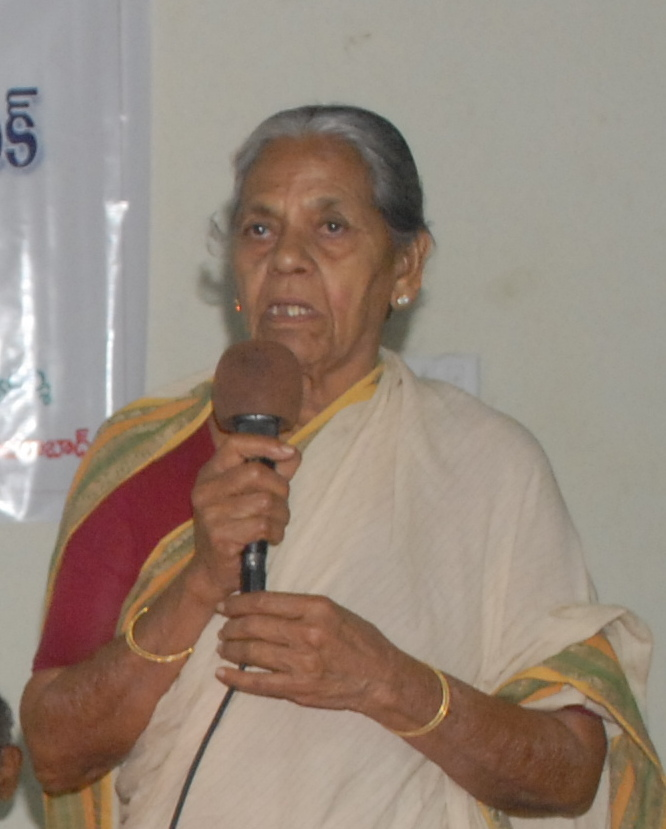
- Mallu Swarajyam in 2010

Member of Andhra Pradesh Legislative Assembly
- In office 1978–1985
- Preceded by: Gurganti Venkat Narasaiah
- Succeeded by: Ramreddy Damodar Reddy
- Constituency: Thungathurthy

Personal details
- Born: 1931 Karvirala Kothagudem, The deccan
- Died: 19 March 2022 (aged 90–91) Hyderabad, Telangana, India
- Party: Communist Party of India (Marxist)
- Spouse: Mallu Venkata Narasimha Reddy
- Children: 3

Mallu Swarajyam (1931 – 19 March 2022) was an Indian politician from Communist Party of India (Marxist) and freedom fighter. She was a member of an armed dalam which took part in the Telangana Rebellion. Her autobiography naa maate tupaakee tootaa (My word is a bullet) was published by Hyderabad Book Trust in 2019.

== Early life ==
Swarajyam was born in Karvirala Kothagudem into a feudal family in 1931 to Bheemireddy Ramireddy and Chokkamma.

== Career ==
Nalgonda district was a part of the Hyderabad State under Nizam. The name Swarajyam is in deference to the wishes of several of her relatives who participated in the satyagraha in response to a call given by Mahatma Gandhi as part of the struggle to attain swaraj (self-rule, or independence) from the British.

At the age of 10, she started rallying people against Nizam's Razakars. Her public career began at the age of 11 when, in response to the Andhra Mahasabha's call to stop bonded labour, she violated family tradition and offered rice to bonded labourers from many castes and communities. Mallu Swarajyam became the commander of a dalam fighting against Zamindars and carried a prize of Rs.10,000 for her head during that time.

The Communist Party of India was fighting with arms under the banner of Andhra Mahasabha against the cruel rule of the Nizam and bonded labour in the state.

Her husband, Mallu Venkata Narasimha Reddy, and her brother, Bhimreddy Narasimha Reddy, who died in 2008 (both members of the communist movement in the State), had a profound influence on her life. The Communist Party of India expanded the scope of the armed struggle from being a means to free bonded labour to one that would take land from the Zamindars and distribute it among the poor.

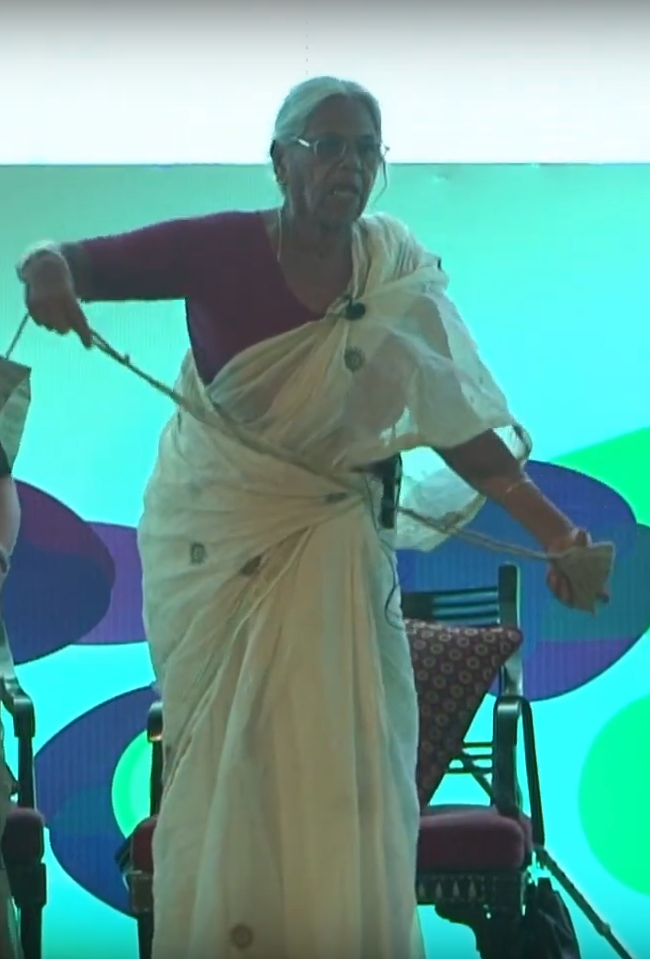
Mallu Swarajyam showing how she would use a slingshot as a weapon in the Telangana Rebellion against the Razakars.

She later actively participated in the welfare of the local peasants and was also a major leader in the Communist party of India. She was elected from Thungathurthi Assembly constituency in 1978 and 1983 as a member of Communist Party of India (Marxist).

== Personal life and death ==
Swarajyam had two sons, Mallu Goutham Reddy and Mallu Nagarjun Reddy. She also had a daughter, Karuna, who ran in the 2009 Elections for Nalgonda in Chiranjeevi's Praja Rajyam Party. Her daughter-in-law, Mallu Laxmi followed her footsteps and she is AIDWA state secretary and working committee member of Communist Party of India (Marxist), also ran in 2019 elections from Nalgonda in Communist Party of India (Marxist). Swarajyam died from multiple organ failure in Hyderabad on 19 March 2022 at the age of 91. Her body is donated to Government Medical College, Nalgonda for medical research.
