= Ailapuram =

Village in India

Coordinates: 18°51′N 78°07′E

Ailapuram is a village situated at 5.5 km from Suryapet city in Suryapet district, Telangana, India.
