= Mangalagudem =

- village
- Location in Telangana, India Mangalagudem (India)
- Coordinates: 17.3599°N 80.1289°E
- Country: India
- State: Telangana

Languages
  - Official: Telugu
- Time zone: UTC+5:30 (IST)
- Vehicle registration: TS
- Website: telangana.gov.in

Mangalagudem is a small village located in Khammam district of the Indian state of Telangana.
