= Nagaram mandal =

Nagaram mandal నాగారం మండలం
- Mandal
- Location in Telangana, India
- Coordinates: 17.456783°N 79.625931°E
- Country: India
- State: Telangana
- District: Suryapet
- Headquarters: Nagaram

Population (2011)
  - Total: 27,596

Languages
  - Official: Telugu
- Time zone: UTC+5:30 (IST)
- PIN: 508279
- Vehicle registration: TS 29

Nagaram mandal is one of the 23 mandals in Suryapet district of the Indian state of Telangana. It is under the administration of Suryapet revenue division with its headquarters at Nagaram. It is bounded by Jajireddygudem mandal towards South, Thungathurthy mandal towards East, Thirumalagiri mandal towards North, Nalgonda district towards West,

== Geography ==
It is in the 256 m elevation(altitude) .

== Demographics ==
Nagaram mandal is having population of 27,596. Vardaman Kota is the largest village and Chennapur is the smallest village in the mandal. It is carved out from Thungathurthy mandal, Jajireddygudem mandal and Thirumalagiri mandals.

== Villages ==
As of 2011 census of India, the mandal has 10 settlements. The settlements in the mandal are listed below:

1. Nagaram (CT)
2. Pastala
3. Pasunoor
4. Laxmapoor
5. Mamidipally
6. Etoor
7. Panigiri
8. Chennapur
9. Vardamanu Kota
10. Deveraneni Kothapally

Notes
(†) Mandal headquarter
