= Neredcherla mandal =

Neredcherla mandal నేరేడుచర్ల మండలం
- Mandal
- Location in Telangana, India
- Coordinates: 16.8321°N 79.4356°E
- Country: India
- State: Telangana
- District: Suryapet
- Headquarters: Neredcherla

Population (2011)
  - Total: 41,047

Languages
  - Official: Telugu
- Time zone: UTC+5:30 (IST)
- PIN: 508218
- Vehicle registration: TS 29

Neredcherla mandal is one of the 23 mandals in Suryapet district of the Indian state of Telangana. It is under the administration of Huzurnagar revenue division with its headquarters at Neredcherla. It is bounded by Penpahad mandal towards North, Garidepally mandal towards East, Palakeedu mandal towards South, Nalgonda district towards West.

== Geography ==
It is in the 91 m elevation(altitude) .

== Demographics ==
Neredcherla mandal is having population of 41,047. Neredcherla is the largest and Kalvaldinne is the smallest village in the mandal.

== Villages ==
As of 2011 census of India, the mandal has 13 settlements. The settlements in the mandal are listed below:

1. Neredcherla (CT) †
2. Penchikal dinna
3. Janaladinne
4. Bodaladinne
5. Kalvaldinne
6. Chillepalli
7. Dirsenacherla
8. Somaram
9. Dacharam
10. Yellaram
11. Fatepur
12. Kallur
13. Medaram

Notes
(†) Mandal headquarter
