= Mothey =

- Village
- Location in Telangana, India Mothey (India)
- Coordinates: 17.1667°N 79.8000°E
- Country: India
- State: Telangana
- District: Suryapet

Area
  - Total: 9.48 km^{2} (3.66 sq mi)
- Elevation: 237 m (778 ft)

Population (2011)
  - Total: 2,241
  - Density: 236/km^{2} (612/sq mi)

Languages
  - Official: Telugu
- Time zone: UTC+5:30 (IST)
- PIN: 508212
- Vehicle registration: TS
- Nearest city: Suryapet
- Climate: hot (Köppen)
- Website: telangana.gov.in

Moteh or Mothey is a village in Suryapet district of the Indian state of Telangana. It is located in Mothey mandal of Suryapet division.

== Geography ==
Moteh is located at 17.1667°N 79.8000°E. It has an average elevation of 237 metres (780 ft).
