= Karvirala =

- village
- Location in Telangana, India Karvirala (India)
- Coordinates: 17.0600°N 79.3°E
- Country: India
- State: Telangana
- District: Suryapet
- Elevation: 17.0700 m (56.004 ft)

Population (2011)
  - Total: 2,868

Languages
  - Official: Telugu
- Time zone: UTC+5:30 (IST)
- PIN: 508001
- Telephone code: 08682
- Vehicle registration: TS 29

Karvirala is a village and Gram panchayat of Thungaturthy mandal, Suryapet district, in Telangana state.
