= Jonathan Malu =

Congolese-German basketball player

No. 6 – Artland Dragons
- Position: Power forward
- League: ProA

Personal information
- Born: March 19, 1993 (age 33) Wiesbaden, Germany
- Listed height: 197 cm (6 ft 6 in)
- Listed weight: 110 kg (243 lb)

Career information
- Playing career: 2010–present

Career history
- 2010–2013: Eisbären Bremerhaven
- 2014–2015: Gießen 46ers
- 2014–2015: →Licher BasketBären
- 2015–2016: RheinStars Köln
- 2016–2017: Alba Berlin
- 2017–2018: Ehingen Urspring
- 2018–present: Artland Dragons

Jonathan Malu (born March 19, 1993) is a Congolese-German professional basketball player who formerly played for Alba Berlin of the Basketball Bundesliga. Malu usually plays as power forward or center.

== Professional career ==
In August 2016, Malu signed a 1-year contract with Alba Berlin. Malu made his debut for Berlin in a 73–77 win over Science City Jena, in which he played 2 minutes.

== DR Congo national team ==
Malu played 3 games for the DR Congo national basketball team at the 2019 FIBA Basketball World Cup qualification where he averaged 6 minutes and 2.0 rebounds per game.
