= Gorantla, Sattenapalle mandal =

Gorantla
- Village
- Interactive map of Gorantla
- Location in Andhra Pradesh, India Gorantla (India)
- Coordinates: 16.49722°N 80.16623°E
- Country: India
- State: Andhra Pradesh
- District: Palnadu
- Mandal: Sattenapalle mandal

Area
  - Total: 6.60 km^{2} (2.55 sq mi)
- Elevation: 12 m (39 ft)

Population (2011)
  - Total: 1,276
  - Density: 193/km^{2} (501/sq mi)

Languages
  - Official: Telugu
- Time zone: UTC+05:30 (IST)
- Postal code: 522 034

Gorantla is a village in Palnadu district of the Indian state of Andhra Pradesh. It is located in Sattenapalle mandal of Guntur revenue division.

== Demographics ==
As of 2011 Census of India, Gorantla had a population of 1,276 of which 648 are males while 628 are females. 182 children are in the age group of 0–6 years. Literacy rate of the village stands at 47.44 with 519 literates.

== See also ==
- Villages in Guntur mandal
