= Malou (disambiguation) =

Malou is a given name, nickname and surname. It may also refer to:

- Tropical Storm Malou (disambiguation)
- Château Malou, a neoclassical building in Brussels, Belgium
- Malou Park, an urban park in Brussels, Belgium
- Malou, a 2019 German short film
