= Sarvaram =

- village
- Location in Telangana, India Sarvaram (India)
- Coordinates: 17.035354656110176°N 79.44829898216673°E
- Country: India
- State: Telangana
- District: Nalgonda

Population (2011)
  - Total: 2,023

Languages
  - Official: Telugu
- Time zone: UTC+5:30 (IST)
- PIN: 508247
- Vehicle registration: TS 05
- Nearest city: Nalgonda
- Website: telangana.gov.in

Sarvaram is a village in Thipparthy mandal in Nalgonda district, in the state Telangana. It is 24 km from Nalgonda. It has a population of 2000. Major classic crops in this village are Rice, cotton (Pathi), and commercial crops are sweet lime (Battayi) crop. The main beauty of the village lies in interaction among the people.
