= Gorantla (surname) =

Gorantla (Telugu: గోరంట్ల) is a Telugu surname. Notable people with the surname include:

- Gorantla Butchaiah Chowdary (born 1946), Indian politician
- Gorantla Venkanna (1871–1947), Indian philanthropist
