= Nuthankal =

- Village
- Nickname: NTKL
- Country: India
- State: Telangana
- District: Suryapet

Area
  - Total: 16.54 km^{2} (6.39 sq mi)

Population (2011)
  - Total: 5,572
  - Density: 336.9/km^{2} (872.5/sq mi)

Languages
  - Official: Telugu
- Time zone: UTC+5:30 (IST)
- PIN: 508221
- Telephone code: 08693
- Vehicle registration: TS-29

Noothankal or Nuthankal is a village in Suryapet district of the Indian state of Telangana.It is located in Nuthankal mandal of Suryapet division in Suryapet district. It is located 25 km from the district headquarters Suryapet.
