= Nuthankal mandal =

Nuthankal mandal నూతనకల్లు మండలం
- Mandal
- Location in Telangana, India
- Coordinates: 17.362435°N 79.711075°E
- Country: India
- State: Telangana
- District: Suryapet
- Headquarters: Nuthankal

Population (2011)
  - Total: 33,305

Languages
  - Official: Telugu
- Time zone: UTC+5:30 (IST)
- PIN: 508221
- Vehicle registration: TS 29

Nuthankal mandal is one of the 23 mandals in Suryapet district of the Indian state of Telangana. It is under the administration of Suryapet revenue division with its headquarters at Nuthankal. It is bounded by Thungathurthy mandal towards its west, Athmakur (S) mandal towards its south, Maddirala mandal towards its north, and Mahabubabad district towards its east.

== Geography ==
It is in the 212 m elevation (altitude).

== Demographics ==
Nuthanakal mandal is having population of 33,305. Talla Singaram is the largest village and Gundla Singaram is the smallest village in the mandal.

== Villages ==
As of 2011 census of India, the mandal has 14 settlements. The settlements in the mandal are listed below:

1. Nuthankal (CT) †
2. Tallasingaram
3. Dirshanapally
4. Yerrapahad
5. Chilpakunta
6. Yadavelly
7. Gundla Singaram
8. Mediguda
9. Peddanemali
10. Bikkumalla
11. Miryala
12. Machanapally
13. Lingampally
14. Venkepally

Notes
(†) Mandal headquarter
