= Munagala =

- Village
- Location in Telangana, India Munagala (India)
- Coordinates: 17.0500°N 79.8333°E
- Country: India
- State: Telangana
- District: Suryapet

Area
  - Total: 20.79 km^{2} (8.03 sq mi)

Population (2011)
  - Total: 8,942
  - Density: 430.1/km^{2} (1,114/sq mi)

Languages
  - Official: Telugu
- Time zone: UTC+5:30 (IST)
- Vehicle registration: TS 29
- Website: telangana.gov.in

Munagala is a village in the Suryapet district in the state of Telangana. It is located in Munagala mandal of Kodad revenue division. It is 24 km far away from the district headquarters Suryapet.
