= Maddirala mandal =

Maddirala mandal మద్దిరాల మండలం
- Mandal
- Location in Telangana, India
- Coordinates: 17.362435°N 79.711075°E
- Country: India
- State: Telangana
- District: Suryapet
- Headquarters: Maddirala

Population (2011)
  - Total: 30,620

Languages
  - Official: Telugu
- Time zone: UTC+5:30 (IST)
- PIN: 508221
- Vehicle registration: TS 29

Maddirala mandal is one of the 23 mandals in Suryapet district of the Indian state of Telangana. It is under the administration of Suryapet revenue division with its headquarters at Maddirala. It is carved out from Thungaturthy and Nuthankal mandals. It is bounded by Thungaturthy mandal towards West, Nuthankal mandal towards South, Mahabubabad district towards North.

== Geography ==
It is in the 212 m elevation (altitude).

== Demographics ==
Maddirala mandal has a population of 30,620. Maddirala is the largest village and Kuntlapally is the smallest village in the mandal.

== Villages ==
As of 2011 census of India, the mandal has 13 settlements. The settlements in the mandal are listed below:

1. Maddirala (CT) †
2. mukundhapuram
3. Chandupatla
4. Polumalla
5. G. Kothapalli
6. Mamindlamadava
7. Chinanemali
8. Gummadavelli
9. Ramachandrapuram
10. Kukkadam
11. Reddygudem
12. Kuntlapally
13. Gorentla

Notes
(†) Mandal headquarter
