= Suryapet revenue division =

Coordinates: 17.1415°N 79.6236°E

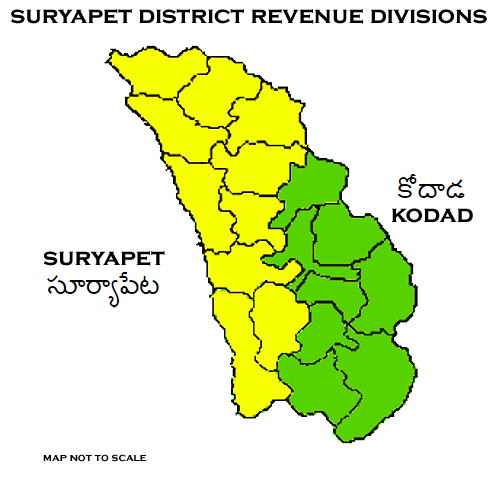
- Suryapet revenue division in yellow
- Country: India
- State: Telangana
- District: Suryapet

Suryapet revenue division (or Suryapet division) is an administrative division in the Suryapet district of the Indian state of Telangana. It is one of the 3 revenue divisions in the district which consists of 11 mandals under its administration. Suryapet is the divisional headquarters of the division.

== Administration ==
The mandals in the division are:

Mandals	Atmakur(s), Chivvemla, Jajireddygudem, Mothey, Nuthankal, Penpahad, Suryapet, Thirumalagiri, Thungathurthy, Maddirala, Nagaram

== See also ==
- List of revenue divisions in Telangana
- List of mandals in Telangana
