= Suryapet district =

- District of Telangana
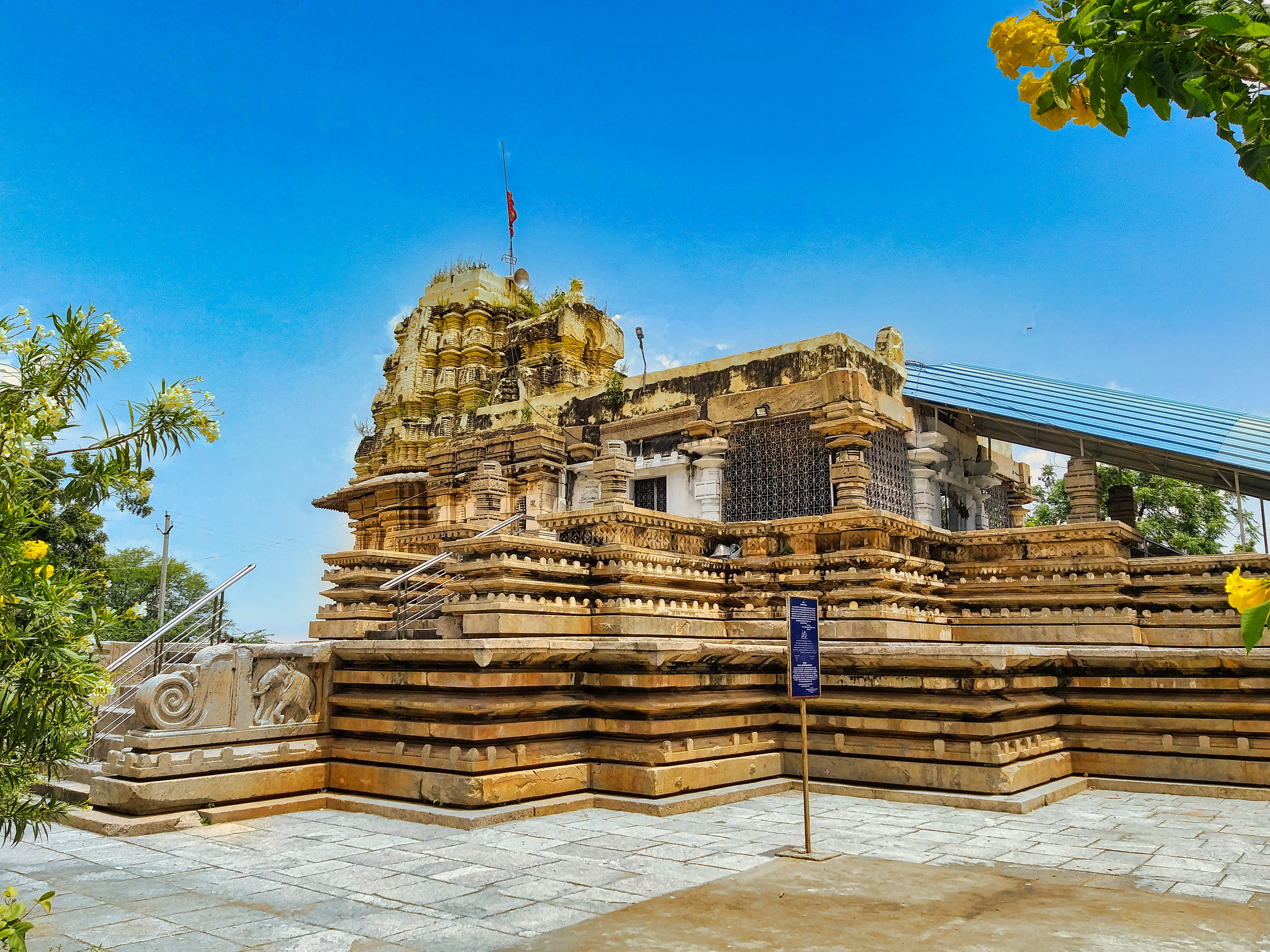
- Erakeshwara Temple, Pillalamarri

- Location in Telangana
- Suryapet district
- Country: India
- State: Telangana
- Established: 2016
- Headquarters: Suryapet
- Mandalas: 23

Government
  - District collector: Tejas Nandlal Pawar IAS
  - Parliament constituencies: Nalgonda and Bhuvanagiri

Area
  - Total: 3,607 km^{2} (1,393 sq mi)

Population (2011)
  - Total: 1,099,560
  - Density: 304.8/km^{2} (789.5/sq mi)
  - Urban: 15.56%

Demographics
  - Literacy: 64.11%
  - Sex ratio: 996
- Time zone: UTC+05:30 (IST)
- Vehicle registration: TG–29
- Major highways: NH-65, NH167, NH-365B, NH-365BB and SH-42
- Website: suryapet.telangana.gov.in

Suryapet district is a district in the Indian state of Telangana. The city of Suryapet is the district headquarters. The district has three revenue divisions Suryapet, Kodad and Huzurnagar. It is sub-divided into 23 mandals. The district shares boundaries with Nalgonda, Khammam, Yadadri, Jangaon and Mahabubabad districts and with the state of Andhra Pradesh.

== Geography ==
The district is spread over an area of 3,374.41 square kilometres (1,302.87 sq mi). This district is bounded by Jangaon district, Mahabubabad district in the northeast, Khammam district in the east, Andhra Pradesh in the south, Nalgonda district in the west and Yadadri district in the northwest.

== Demographics ==
Religion in Suryapet district (2011)
Hinduism	92.59%
Islam	6.00%
Christianity	0.98%
Other or not stated	0.43%

As of 2011 Census of India, the district has a population of 1,099,560. Suryapet has a sex ratio of 996 females per 1000 males and a literacy rate of 64.11%. 110,136 (10.02%) were under 6 years of age. 171,039 (15.56%) lived in urban areas. Scheduled Castes and Scheduled Tribes made up 208,326 (18.95%) and 141,271 (12.85%) of the population respectively.

Languages of Suryapet district (2011)
1. Telugu (83.3%)
2. Lambadi (11.2%)
3. Urdu (4.97%)
4. Others (0.51%)

At the time of the 2011 census, 83.28% of the population spoke Telugu, 11.24% Lambadi and 4.97% Urdu as their first language.

The Krishna River and Musi River flow through the Suryapet district.

== Major city ==
- Suryapet

== Major towns ==
- Kodad
- Huzurnagar
- Neredcherla
- Thirumalagiri
- Thungathurthy

== Villages ==
- Ailapuram
- Ananthagiri
- Chilkur
- Ganugabanda
- Garidepally
- Janpahad
- Kapugallu
- Keethavarigudem
- Kokkireni
- Madhavarayunigudem
- Mamidala
- Mattampally
- Mellacheruvu
- Nagaram
- Nandapuram
- Nuthankal
- Penchikal dinna
- Penpahad
- Phanigiri
- Ponugode
- Sri Rangapuram
- Venkepally

== Culture and Tourism ==
- Lingamanthula Swamy temple - 5 km from Suryapet
- Sri Parvathi Mahadeva Nameshwara Temple and Chennakeshava Swamy temple, Pillalamarri - 6 km from Suryapet
- Dandu Maisamma temple - 12 km from Suryapet
- Sri Undrugonda Lakshmi Narasimha Swamy temple, Undrugonda - 13 km from Suryapet
- Musi Reservoir - 27 km from Suryapet
- Phanigiri Buddhist Site - 42 km from Suryapet
- Ananthagiri Hill - 54 km from Suryapet
- Sri Yarradri(Yarravaram) Dhulla Gutta Bala Vugra Lakshmi Narasimha Swami temple - 55 km from Suryapet
- Janapadu Dargah-55 km from Suryapet
- Swayambu Shambhu Lingeshwara Temple, Mellacheruvu - 63 km from Suryapet
- Mattapalli Sri Lakshmi Narasimha Swamy Temple, Mattapalli - 80 km from Suryapet

== Administrative divisions ==
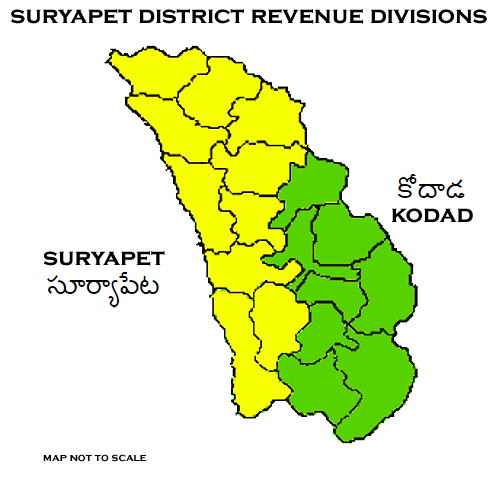
Suryapet District Revenue divisions

The district has three revenue divisions of Suryapet, Kodad and Huzurnagar revenue division. It is sub-divided into 23 mandals. Tejas Nand Lal Pawar is the present collector of the district. The district consists of five municipalities. Suryapet, Kodad, Huzurnagar, Thirumalagiri and Neredcherla are the five municipalities.

=== Mandals ===
S.No.	Suryapet revenue division	Kodad revenue division	Huzurnagar revenue division
1	Suryapet	Chilkur	Palakeedu
2	Chivvemla	Ananthagiri	Huzurnagar
3	Mothey	Kodad	Mellachervu
4	Jajireddygudem	Munagala	Mallareddygudem
5	Nuthankal	Nadigudem	Mattampally
6	Penpahad		Nereducherla
7	Athmakur(S)		Garidepally
8	Thirumalagiri		
9	Thungathurthy		
10	Nagaram		
11	Maddirala		

== Notable Personalities ==
Tollywood actors Kanta Rao, Prabhakar Reddy, Venu Madhav, were from Suryapet District.

Martyr B. Santosh Babu, Army colonel and Maha Vir Chakra awardee during Galwan Valley clash

== See also ==
- Jan Pahad Dargah
- List of districts in Telangana
