= List of power stations in Telangana =

Below is a list of all the power plants installed and operated by the central, private and state government of Telangana.

== Non-renewable ==
=== Thermal power ===
Map of currently operating and proposed coal fired thermal power plants in the Indian state of Telangana. Blue are operational and red are proposed.

Thermal power is the predominant source of power in Telangana state. There are different types of thermal power plants based on the fuel used to generate the steam, such as coal, gas or diesel.

Name	Operator	Location	Sector	Fuel	Units (MW)	Installed capacity (MW)	Under construction (MW)	Coordinates
Kakatiya TPP	TGGENCO	Chelpur, Bhupalpally	State	coal	1x500, 1x600	1100		18.384798°N 79.839553°E
Kothagudem TPS	TGGENCO	Paloncha, Kothagudem	State	coal	2x250, 1x500, 1x800	1800		17.619561°N 80.690688°E
Ramagundam TPS	TGGENCO	Ramagundam, Peddapalli	State	coal	1x62.5	62.5		18.755490°N 79.456271°E
NTPC Ramagundam	NTPC	Ramagundam, Peddapalli	Central	coal	3x200, 4x500	2600		18.759043°N 79.454466°E
Singareni TPP	SCCL	Jaipur, Mancherial	State	coal	2x600, 1x800	1200	800	18.830306°N 79.573771°E
Bhadradri TPP	TGGENCO	Manuguru, Kothagudem	State	coal	4x270		1080	17.937255°N 80.81852°E
Telangana Super TPP	NTPC	RAMAGUNDAM, Telangana	Central	coal	2x800		1600	18.759043°N 79.454466°E
Yadadri TPP	TGGENCO	Dameracherla, Nalgonda	State	coal	5x800		4000	17.937255°N 80.81852°E
Total capacity (MW)					35	6,682.5	7,480	

== Renewable ==
=== Hydroelectric ===
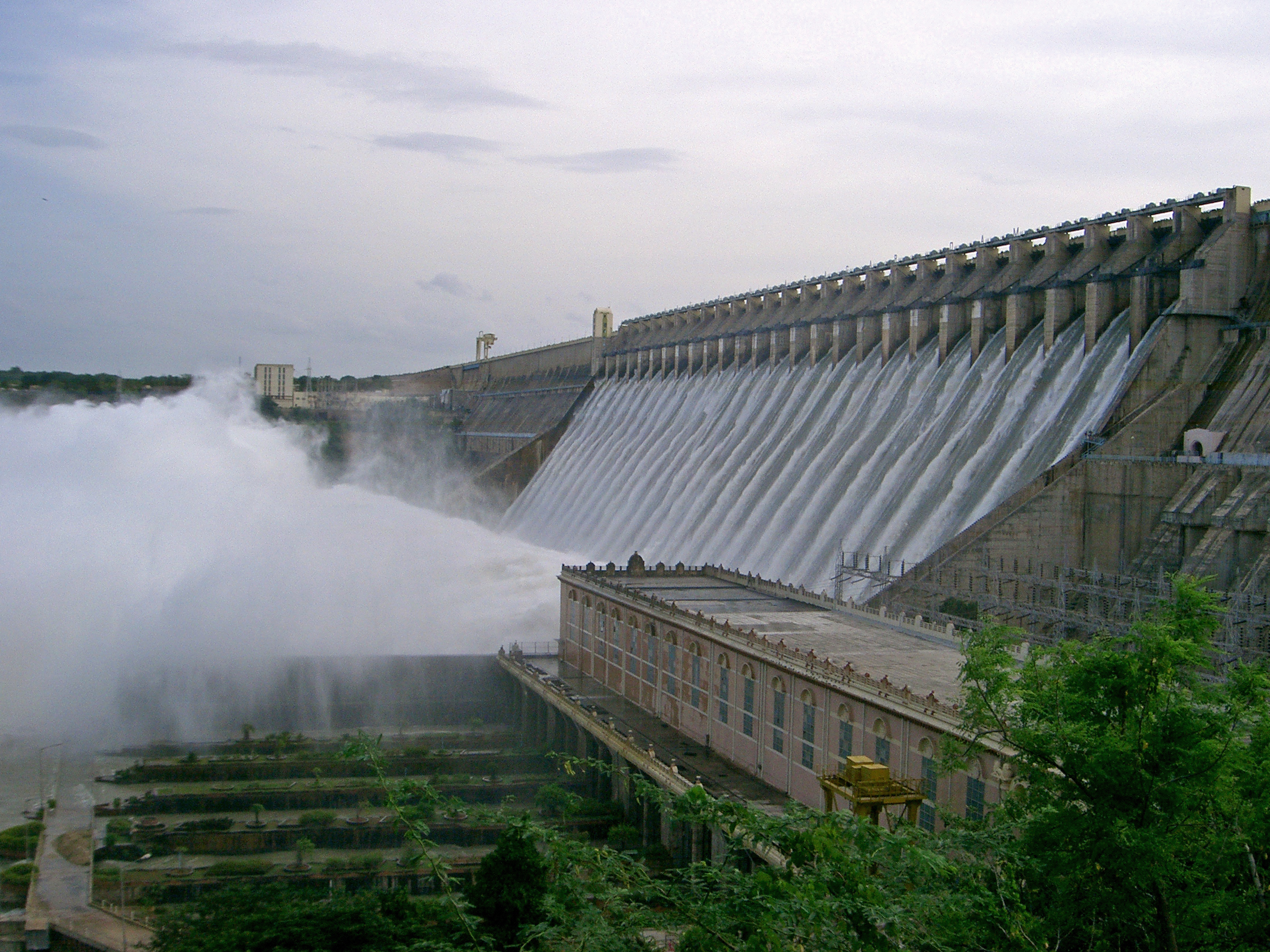
Nagarjuna Sagar Dam gates and power house view

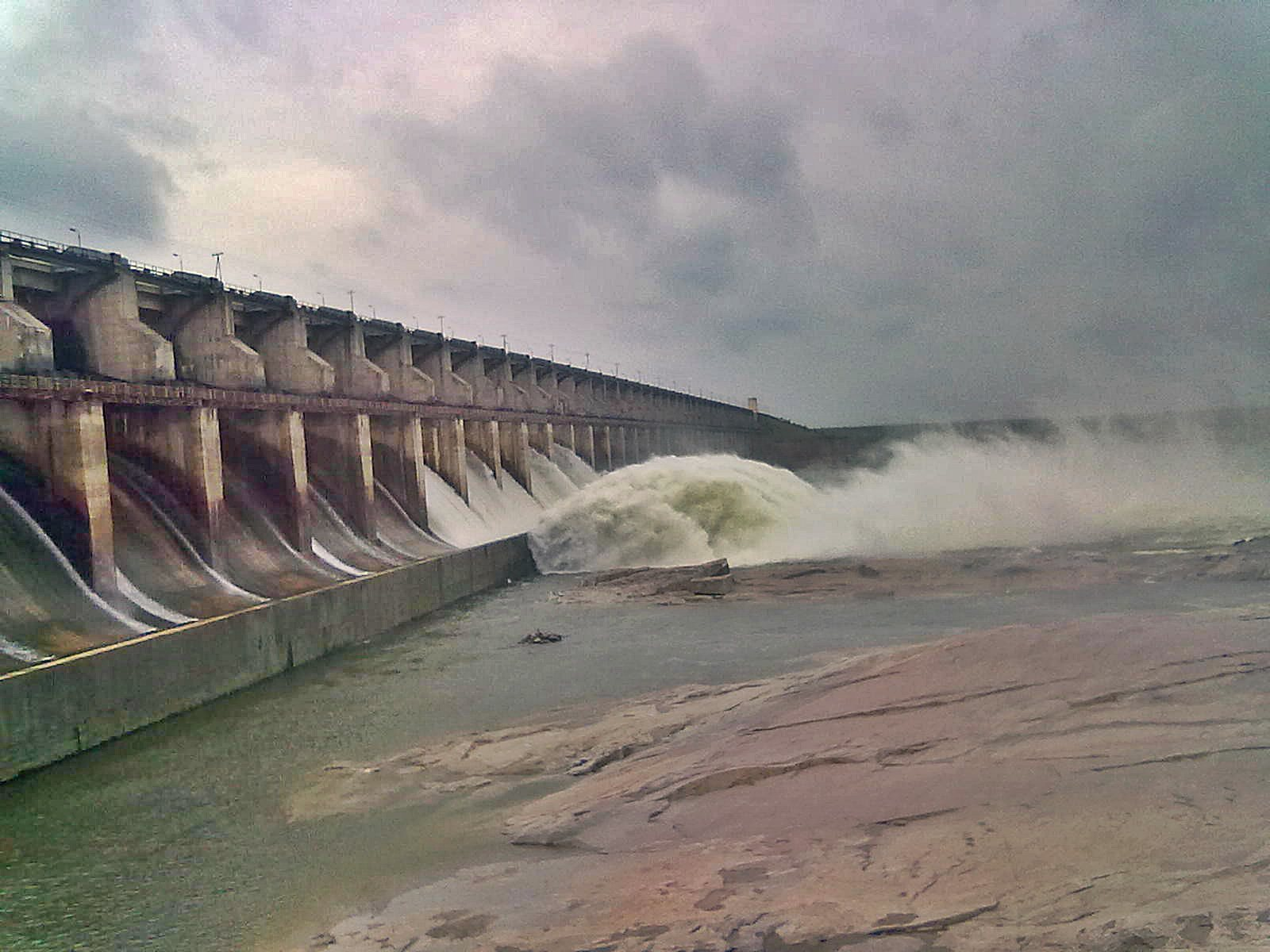
SriRam Sagar Dam on Godavari in Pochampahad

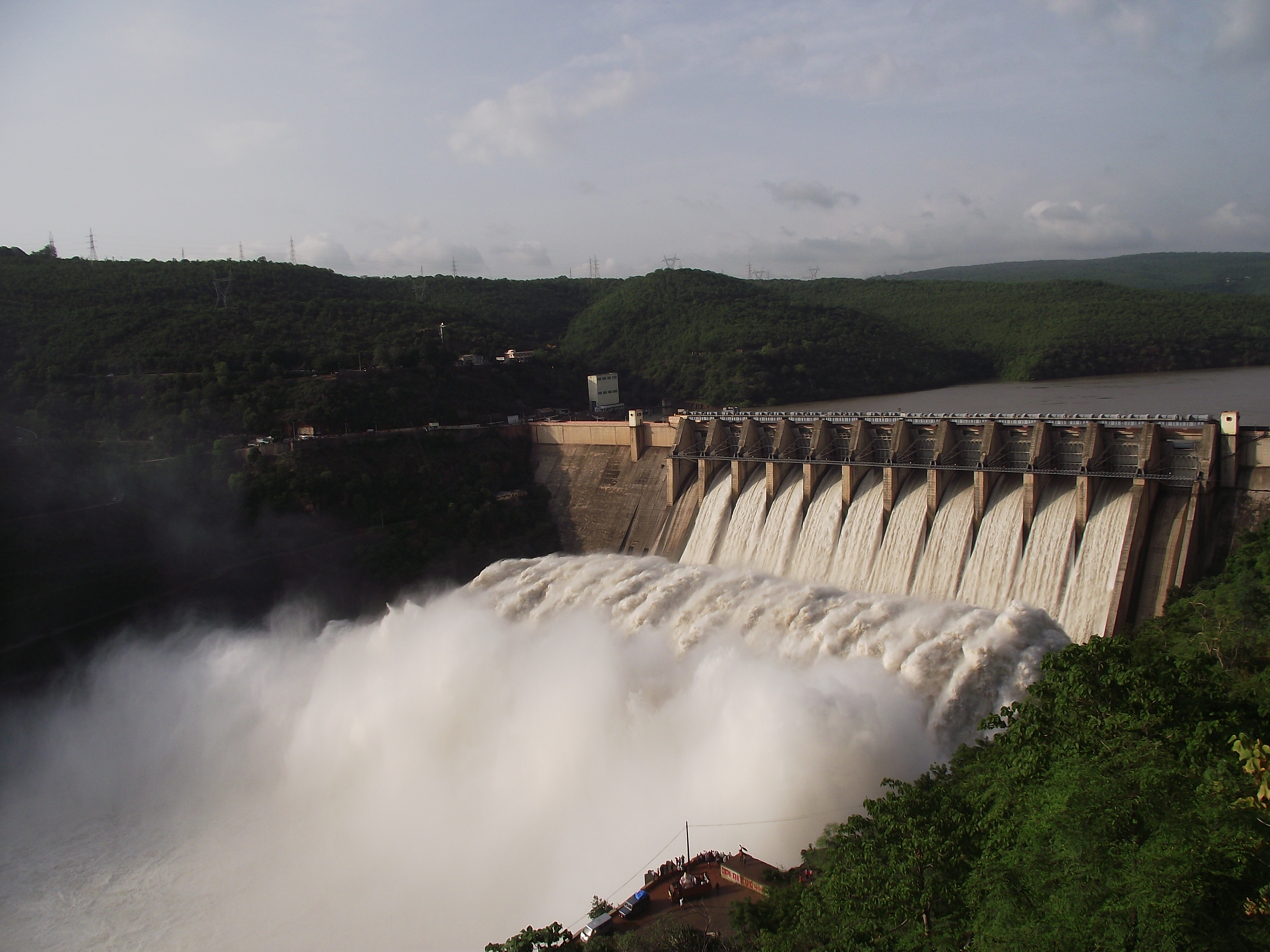
Srisailam Dam gates open view from left bank in Telangana

This is a list of hydroelectric power plants in Telangana.

S.no.	Project name	Operator	Sector	Units (MW)	Inst. capacity (MW)	Under construction (MW)	Ref
1	Nagarjuna Sagar Main PH	TGGENCO	State	1x110, 7x100.8	815.6		
2	Nagarjuna Sagar LCPH	TGGENCO	State	2x30	60		
3	Srisailam LBPH	TGGENCO	State	6x150	900		
4	Pochampad PH	TGGENCO	State	4x9	36		
5	Singur PH	TGGENCO	State	2x7.5	15		
6	Nizam Sagar PH	TGGENCO	State	2x5	10		
7	Paleru Mini Hydel	TGGENCO	State	2x1	2		
8	Peddapalli Mini Hydels	TGGENCO	State	1x9.16	9.16		
9	Pulichintala HEP	TGGENCO	State	4x30	120		
10	Lower Jurala HEP	TGGENCO	State	6x40	240		
11	Jurala HEP	TGGENCO	State	6x39	234		
12	Dummugudem Mini Hydel Power Project	SLS Power Corporation	Private	6x4	24		
13	Janapadu Hydro Power Project Pvt Ltd	JHPPPL	Private	1x1	1		
14	Nagarjuna Agro Tech Ltd	NATL	Private	1x1.335	4		
15	Saraswati Power Industries Pvt Ltd	SPIL	Private	2x1	2		
16	Komaram Bheem Small Hydro Electric Project	Design Group	Private	1x3	3		
17	Sammakka Sagar Hydro Electric Project (Proposed)	TGGENCO	State	10x24		240	
18	Sitamma Sagar Hydro Electric Project (Proposed)	TGGENCO	State	8x40		320	
Total capacity (MW)					2475.76	560	

=== Solar ===
This is a list of all solar power plants in Telangana.

S.no.	Project name	Operator	Sector	Inst. capacity (MW)	Under construction (MW)	Ref
1	Jurala Solar PV Plant	TGGENCO	State	1		
2	Ramagundam Solar PV	NTPC	Central	10	15	
3	Dharmaraopet Solar PV Plant	ReNew Power	Private	143		
4	Telangana I	Talettutayi Solar Projects Private Limited	Private	12		
5	Telangana II	Talettutayi Solar Projects Six Private Limited	Private	12		
Total capacity (MW)					15	

==== Gas power generation ====
Shankarampalli Gas based power generation station is presently not working.
