= Pinapaka Assembly constituency =

Constituency of the Telangana legislative assembly in India

Coordinates: 17.18°N 80.41°E

Pinapaka
- Constituency No. 110 for the Telangana Legislative Assembly
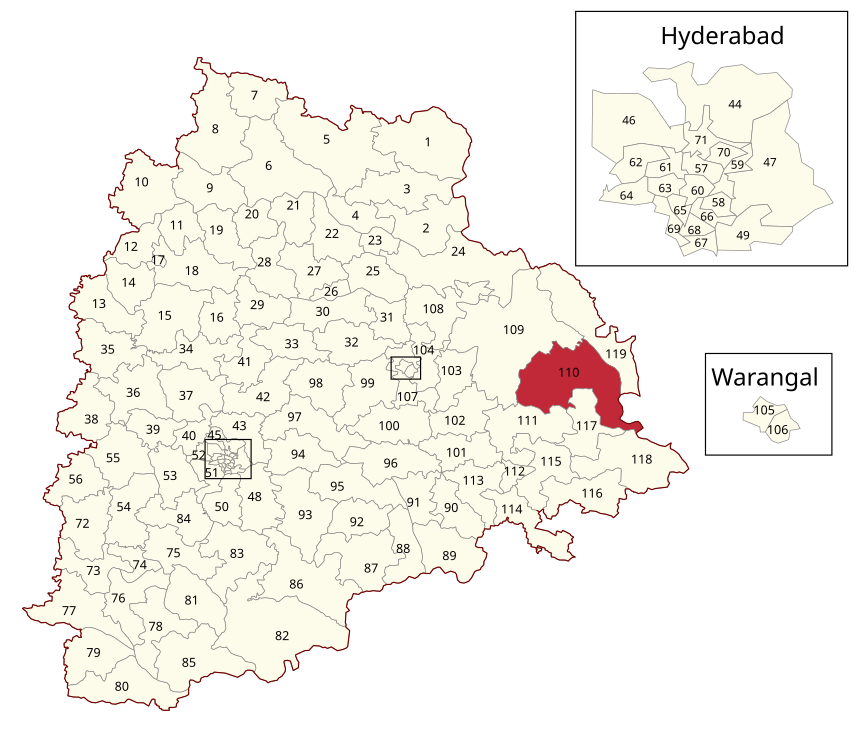
- Location of Pinapaka Assembly constituency within Telangana

Constituency details
- Country: India
- Region: South India
- State: Telangana
- District: Bhadradri Kothagudem
- Lok Sabha constituency: Mahabubabad
- Established: 2008
- Total electors: 5,67,676
- Reservation: ST

Member of Legislative Assembly
- 3rd Telangana Legislative Assembly
- Incumbent Payam Venkateswarlu
- Party: Indian National Congress
- Elected year: 2023

Pinapaka Assembly constituency is a ST reserved constituency of Telangana Legislative Assembly, India. It is one of five constituencies in Bhadradri Kothagudem district. It is part of Mahabubabad Lok Sabha constituency.

Payam Venkateswarlu, of Indian National Congress in Telangana Legislative Assembly, is representing the constituency.

== Mandals ==
The Assembly Constituency presently comprises the following Mandals:

Mandal
Pinapaka
Manuguru
Gundala
Burgampahad
Aswapuram
Karakagudem
Allapally

== Members of Legislative Assembly ==
Year	Member	Political party
2009	Rega Kantha Rao	Indian National Congress
2014	Payam Venkateswarlu	YSR Congress Party
2018	Rega Kantha Rao	Indian National Congress
2023	Payam Venkateswarlu	Indian National Congress

== Election results ==
Vote share of Winning candidates
2023	56.61%
2018	50.13%
2014	31.53%
2009	34.69%

=== 2023 ===
2023 Telangana Legislative Assembly election: Pinapaka (ST)
Party	Candidate	Votes	%	±%
INC	Payam Venkateswarlu	90,510	56.61	▲6.48
BRS	Rega Kantha Rao	56,004	35.03	▼1.53
BJP	Balaraju Podium	2,627	1.64	▲0.05
IND	Durga Palvancha	2,167	1.36	Steady
IND	Punem Rajesh	1,998	1.25	Steady
NOTA	None of the Above	905	0.57	▼0.03
BSP	Vajja Samulu	719	0.45	New entry
IND	8 Independent Candidates	4,295	2.69	Steady
OTH	4 Other Party Candidates	658	0.41	Steady
Majority		34,506	21.58	▲8.01
Turnout		159,883		
INC hold		Swing		

=== 2018 ===
2018 Telangana Legislative Assembly election: Pinapaka (ST)
Party	Candidate	Votes	%	±%
INC	Rega Kantha Rao	72,283	50.13	New entry
TRS	Payam Venkateswarlu	52,718	36.56	▲15.47
IND	Palvancha Durga	5,277	3.66	Steady
IND	Mukti Satyam	3,570	2.48	Steady
CPI(M)	Katiboina Nageswara Rao	2,581	1.79	New entry
BJP	Chanda Santosh Kumar	2,292	1.59	▼19.34
IND	Kalthi Yerraiah	1,013	0.70	Steady
NOTA	None of the Above	868	0.60	▼0.50
IND	2 Independent Candidates	910	0.63	Steady
OTH	7 Other Party Candidates	2,675	1.85	Steady
Majority		19,565	13.57	▲3.13
Turnout				
Swing to INC from YSRCP		Swing		

=== 2014 ===
2014 Andhra Pradesh Legislative Assembly election: Pinapaka (ST)
Party	Candidate	Votes	%	±%
YSRCP	Payam Venkateswarlu	42,475	31.53	New entry
TRS	Dr. N. Shankar	28,410	21.09	New entry
BJP	Chanda Lingaiah Dora	28,195	20.93	▲19.38
CPI	Tholem Ramesh	19,313	14.34	▼20.05
IND	Narasimha Rao Payam	4,003	2.97	Steady
IND	Mukthi Sathyam	3,922	2.91	Steady
BSP	Kaleti Bhadraiah	1,849	1.37	▼0.77
PPOI	Bhukya Chitti Babu	1,504	1.12	New entry
NOTA	None of the Above	1,480	1.10	New entry
IND	Komaram Satyanarayana	1,130	0.84	Steady
IND	Sode Venkateswarlu	999	0.74	Steady
IND	Thati Surya Kala	871	0.65	Steady
IND	Sujatha Nitta	546	0.41	Steady
Majority		14,065	10.44	▲10.14
Turnout		134,697	78.51	
Swing to YSRCP from INC		Swing		

=== 2009 ===
2009 Andhra Pradesh Legislative Assembly election: Pinapaka (ST)
Party	Candidate	Votes	%	±%
INC	Rega Kantha Rao	40,028	34.69	
CPI	Payam Venkateswarlu	39,679	34.39	
PRP	Janakiram Tejavath	17,380	15.06	
IND	Mukthi Satyam	5,185	4.49	
BSP	Bandaru Nageswara Rao	2,475	2.14	
IND	Chanda Bharathi	2,230	1.93	
IND	Ravindra Kumar Dharavath	1,966	1.70	
LSP	Banavath Srinivasa Rao	1,936	1.68	
BJP	Bhukya Seetharamulu	1,790	1.55	
IND	Dharavath Chandu	1,500	1.30	
IND	Daravath Hanmanth Naik	647	0.56	
IND	Chintha Sammaiah	570	0.49	
Majority		349	0.30	
Turnout		115,386		
INC win (new seat)				

== See also ==
- List of constituencies of Telangana Legislative Assembly
