= Yerragunta =

Coordinates: 17°09′N 78°14′E

Yerragunta PeddiReddyGudem
- village
- Interactive map of Yerragunta
- Country: India
- State: Telangana
- District: Bhadradri

Languages
  - Official: Telugu
- Time zone: UTC+5:30 (IST)
- PIN: 507316
- Telephone code: 08744
- Vehicle registration: AP 20
- Coastline: 0 kilometres (0 mi)
- Nearest city: Kothagudem(Head quarters of Bhadradri District)
- Lok Sabha constituency: Khammam
- Avg. summer temperature: 48 °C (118 °F)
- Avg. winter temperature: 32 °C (90 °F)

Yerragunta is a village in the Annapu Reddy PaLLI mandal of Bhadradri district in Telangana, India. The population of the village is around 3000. Government primary school and ZPS schools are established to provide education to the children of Yerragunta as well as its surrounding small villages. State government established a PHC for people to get primary health services at free of cost. Vijaya Bank used to operate a branch here from many years but the name has been changed to Bank of Barons recently. Paddy, cotton and mango farming plays predominant role in its economy. Rain fall, tanks and bores are major irrigation sources. Lord Sitarama Temple, Masjid and Saibaba temples are famous in this village. Sankranti, Ramzan, Ganesh chaturdi, Dussera, Sivaratri and Peerla Panduga are famous festivals. This village is well connected to Kothagudem, Sathupalli, Bhadrachalam and Vijayawada through road. Kothagudem railway station which is famously known as Bhadrachalam Road railway station is the only nearest railway station.
