= Mandalapalli =

Mandalapally
- village
- Location in Telangana, India
- Coordinates: 17.2667°N 81.0167°E
- Country: India
- State: Telangana
- District: Bhadradri Kothagudem
- Elevation: 267 m (876 ft)

Languages
  - Official: Telugu
- Time zone: UTC+5:30 (IST)
- Postal code: 506307
- Vehicle registration: TS
- Nearest city: Khammam
- Lok Sabha constituency: khammam
- Vidhan Sabha constituency: Aswaraopeta
- Climate: hot (Köppen)

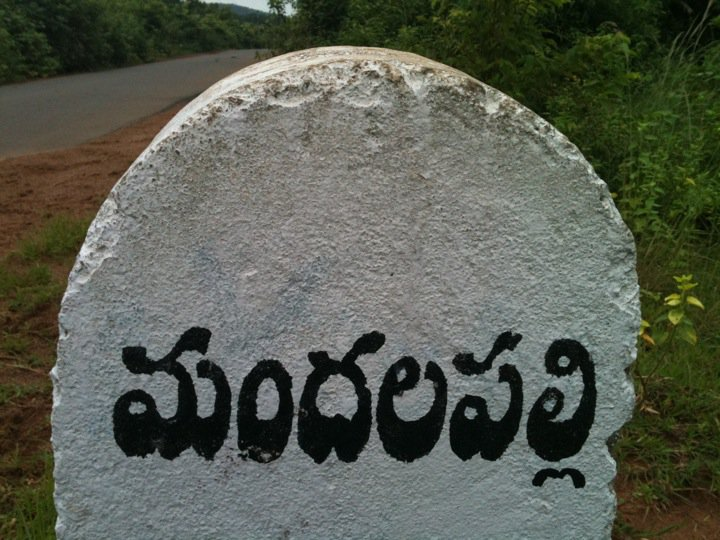
Mandalapalli Village boundary stone

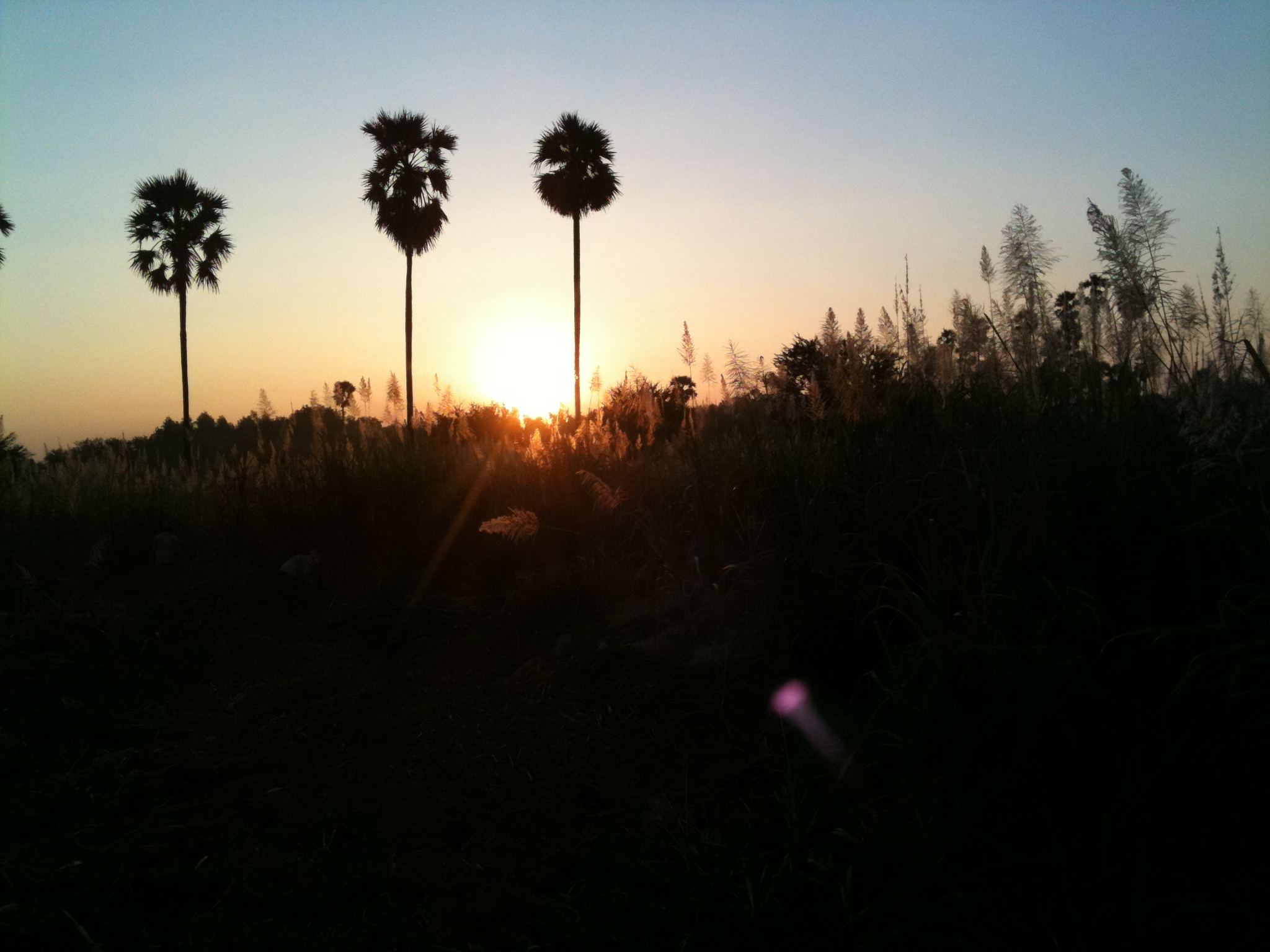

Mandalapalli is a village in Dammapeta mandal in Bhadradri Kothagudem district, Telangana.

== Geography ==
Mandalapalli has an average elevation of 206 metres (679 ft). Located on the highway connecting Khammam and Rajahmundry between Sathupalli and Aswaraopeta.

The village has green fields, plantations, forest, hills, hillocks, ponds, lakes, and cattle.

== Economy ==
Most of the people work in agriculture. Paddy, maize, sugarcane, and groundnut are the main crops. Mango, cashew nut, palm oil and coconut are major plantation crops. All these crops are irrigated either from ground water or lakes.
