= Mulakalapalli mandal =

Mulakalapalli ములకలపల్లి
- Mandal (Tehsil)
- Location in Telangana, India Mulakalapalli (India)
- Coordinates: 17.504°N 80.829°E
- Country: India
- State: Telangana
- District: Bhadradri Kothagudem

Government
  - Body: Mandal Parishad
  - Panchayat Secretary: Srinivas Rao
  - MLA: Mecha Nageshwar Rao
  - Member of Parliament: Nama Nageswara Rao

Population (2011)
  - Total: 34,796

Languages
  - Official: Telugu
- Time zone: UTC+5:30 (IST)
- PIN: 507115
- Vehicle registration: TS
- Vidhan Sabha constituency: Aswaraopeta
- Lok Sabha constituency: Khammam
- Website: telangana.gov.in

Mulkalapalle, Mulakalapalli or Mulakalapally is a mandal in Bhadradri Kothagudem district of Telangana, India.

Palwancha is the nearest town from this village. This village is 16 km away from Palwancha.

== Geography ==
The district is spread over an area of 1,084 square kilometres (419 sq mi). It is situated 505 metres above sea level. The landmark consists of rocky terrain and monolithic rocks in the outskirts of the city.

== Demographics ==
According to Indian census 2011,

Level	Name	TRU	No_HH	TOT_P	TOT_M	TOT_F	P_06	M_06	F_06	P_SC	M_SC	F_SC	P_ST	M_ST	F_ST	P_LIT	M_LIT	F_LIT	P_ILL	M_ILL	F_ILL
CD block	Mulkalapalle	Total	9305	34794	17302	17492	3809	1929	1880	2759	1257	1502	21417	10710	10707	16788	9363	7425	18006	7939	10067
CD block	Mulkalapalle	Rural	9305	34794	17302	17492	3809	1929	1880	2759	1257	1502	21417	10710	10707	16788	9363	7425	18006	7939	10067
CD block	Mulkalapalle	Urban	0	0	0	0	0	0	0	0	0	0	0	0	0	0	0	0	0	0	0
Village	Kistaram	Rural	0	0	0	0	0	0	0	0	0	0	0	0	0	0	0	0	0	0	0
Village	Annaram	Rural	228	834	423	411	115	61	54	0	0	0	734	370	364	282	168	114	552	255	297
Village	Pusugudem	Rural	1410	5180	2564	2616	549	277	272	187	95	92	3965	1953	2012	2370	1378	992	2810	1186	1624
Village	Chaparalapalle	Rural	867	3111	1565	1546	302	146	156	130	60	70	1481	747	734	1486	847	639	1625	718	907
Village	Madharam	Rural	455	1639	773	866	175	85	90	9	4	5	856	398	458	860	458	402	779	315	464
Village	Mulkalapalle	Rural	1623	6679	3246	3433	725	370	355	1178	485	693	2400	1195	1205	3844	2000	1844	2835	1246	1589
Village	Kamalapuram	Rural	275	1134	631	503	114	55	59	41	14	27	914	516	398	687	436	251	447	195	252
Village	Jagannathapuram	Rural	2155	7844	3931	3913	884	450	434	516	259	257	4996	2497	2499	3680	2069	1611	4164	1862	2302
Village	Kapugangaram	Rural	0	0	0	0	0	0	0	0	0	0	0	0	0	0	0	0	0	0	0
Village	Mookamamidi	Rural	592	2094	1003	1091	244	120	124	104	55	49	1506	718	788	982	551	431	1112	452	660
Village	Gopalaraopeta	Rural	0	0	0	0	0	0	0	0	0	0	0	0	0	0	0	0	0	0	0
Village	Pagallapalle	Rural	758	2774	1358	1416	247	129	118	485	234	251	1644	810	834	1338	731	607	1436	627	809
Village	Thimmampeta	Rural	685	2516	1297	1219	324	169	155	109	51	58	1944	1002	942	947	539	408	1569	758	811
Village	Rachannagudem	Rural	257	989	511	478	130	67	63	0	0	0	977	504	473	312	186	126	677	325	352

== Gram panchayats in Mulkalpally ==
S. no	GP name	Population
1	Chaparalapalli	
2	Chowtigudem	
3	Guttagudem	
4	Jagannadhapuram	2nd
5	Kamalapuram	
6	Madaram	
7	Mookamamidi	
8	Mulakalapalli	1st
9	Mutyalampadu	
10	Pathagangaram	
11	Pathagundalapadu	
12	Pogallapalli	
13	Pusugudem	
14	Ramanchandrapuram	
15	Rachannagudem	
16	Seethaigudem	
17	Seetharampuram	
18	Tallapai	
19	Thimmampeta	
20	V.k. Ramavaram	

== Government offices in Mulkalpally ==
- Mandal Praja Parishad Office
- Mandal Revenue Office
- Police Station
- Govt School
- Govt Intermediate College
