= Pinapaka mandal =

Pinapaka
- Country: India
- State: Telangana
- District: Bhadradri Kothagudem

Languages
  - Official: Telugu
- Time zone: UTC+5:30 (IST)
- PIN: 507117
- Vehicle registration: TS28
- Nearest city: manuguru
- Vidhan Sabha constituency: Pinapaka
- Climate: hot (Köppen)
- Website: telangana.gov.in

Pinapaka is a Mandal in Bhadradri Kothagudem district, Telangana.

== Assembly constituency ==
It is an Assembly constituency in Telangana Legislative Assembly. Pinapaka, Manuguru, Gundala, Burgampahad and Aswapuram mandals comes under this constituency.

== Demographics ==
- Total Population: 46,597 in 10,619 Households.
- Male Population: 23,665 and Female Population: 22,932
- Children Under 6-years of age: 7,049 (Boys - 3,600 and Girls -3,449)
- Total Literates: 20,046

== Villages ==
The villages in Pinapaka mandal include:

- BC.Ravigudem
- Anantharam
- Barlagudem
- Battupalli
- Bayyaram
- Duginepalli
- Elchireddipally
- Janampeta
- Karakagudem
- Mallaram
- Padma Puram
- Pinapaka
- Potlapalli
- Regalla
- Samath Mothe
- Samathbattupalli
- Singireddipalli
- Uppaka
- Venkatraopeta
- T.Kothagudem
- Bheemavaram
