= Payam Venkateswarlu =

Indian politician (born 1974)

Member of the Telangana Legislative Assembly
- Incumbent
- Assumed office December 2023
- Preceded by: Rega Kantha Rao
- In office 2014–2018

Payam Venkateswarlu (born 1974) is an Indian politician from Telangana state. He is an MLA from Pinapaka Assembly constituency which is reserved for ST community Bhadradri Kothagudem district. He represents Indian National Congress Party and won the 2023 Telangana Legislative Assembly election to become a two time MLA.

== Early life and education ==
Venkateswarlu is from Pinapaka, Bhadradri Kothagudem. His late father Payam Kamaraju was a farmer. He completed intermediate in 1992 and joined the Government Junior College, Manuguru for graduation but discontinued his studies.

== Career ==
Venkateswarlu won the Pinapaka Assembly constituency representing Indian National Congress in the 2023 Telangana Legislative Assembly election. He polled 90,510 votes, and defeated his nearest rival Kantha Rao Rega of Bharat Rashtra Samithi by a margin of 34,506 votes. He lost the 2018 Assembly election to the same rival, Kantha Rao Rega after switching to TRS. Earlier, he won the Pinapaka seat in the 2014 Andhra Pradesh Legislative Assembly election representing YSR Congress Party. He then defeated his nearest rival N. Shankar of Indian National Congress by a margin of 14,065 votes.
