= Bhadradri =

Bhadradri may refer to:

- Bhadrachalam or Bhadradri, a census town in Telangana, India
  - Bhadradri Kothagudem district, a district in Telangana, India centred on the town
  - Bhadrachalam (Assembly constituency)
  - Bhadrachalam (Lok Sabha constituency)
  - Bhadradri Thermal Power Plant, a proposed power plant project
  - Sita Ramachandraswamy Temple, Bhadrachalam
- Bhadrachalam (film), 2001 Indian film by Nimmala Shankar
- Bhadradri Ramudu, a 2004 Indian film
- Bhadradri (film), a Telugu film of 2008
- Bhadradri Ramadasu or Bhadrachala Ramadasu, a 17th-century Indian composer
