= Shyam Mohan K =

- Born: November 19, 1962 (age 63)
- Education: Andhra University (B.A., 1995)
- Occupations: Journalist, cartoonist, documentary filmmaker, author
- Years active: 1984–present
- Known for: Jana Gana Mana Telangana (book)
- Notable work: Rural Media (YouTube channel)
- Awards: Rythu Nestham Best Journalist Award (2017); Telugu University Keerthi Puraskaram (2021); Best Digital Media Journalist Award (2025); Best TV Cartoon Award (1991)

Shyam Mohan K(born 19 November 1962) is an Indian Telugu journalist, cartoonist, documentary filmmaker, and author. He is best known for his acclaimed book Jana Gana Mana Telangana, a collection of his field reports that highlights various aspects of rural deprivation in Telangana.

He founded the Rural Media YouTube channel in 2015, a digital media platform dedicated to bringing the voices of India's most marginalized communities into the national spotlight. Through powerful ground-level storytelling across more than 120 remote villages, his work has exposed critical gaps in rural development and contributed to real-world change and policy responses.

== Early life and education ==
Shyam Mohan's father, originally from the Godavari coastal region of Andhra Pradesh, migrated in 1950 to the Kothagudem area in Telangana in search of employment in the Singareni coal mines.

Shyam Mohan began his primary education at Carmel School in Mandamarri, in present-day Adilabad district. He later earned a Bachelor of Arts (B.A.) degree from Andhra University in 1995.

== Career ==
Shyam Mohan began his journalism career in 1988 with the Telugu daily Udayam. He subsequently worked with prominent newspapers such as Andhra Jyothi and Surya.

He also worked as a freelance reporter for BBC Telugu between 2017 and 2018. In addition, he has written socio-economic and tribal affairs editorials for leading publications including Saakshi, Andhra Jyothi, Namaste Telangana, and The Federal Telangana website.

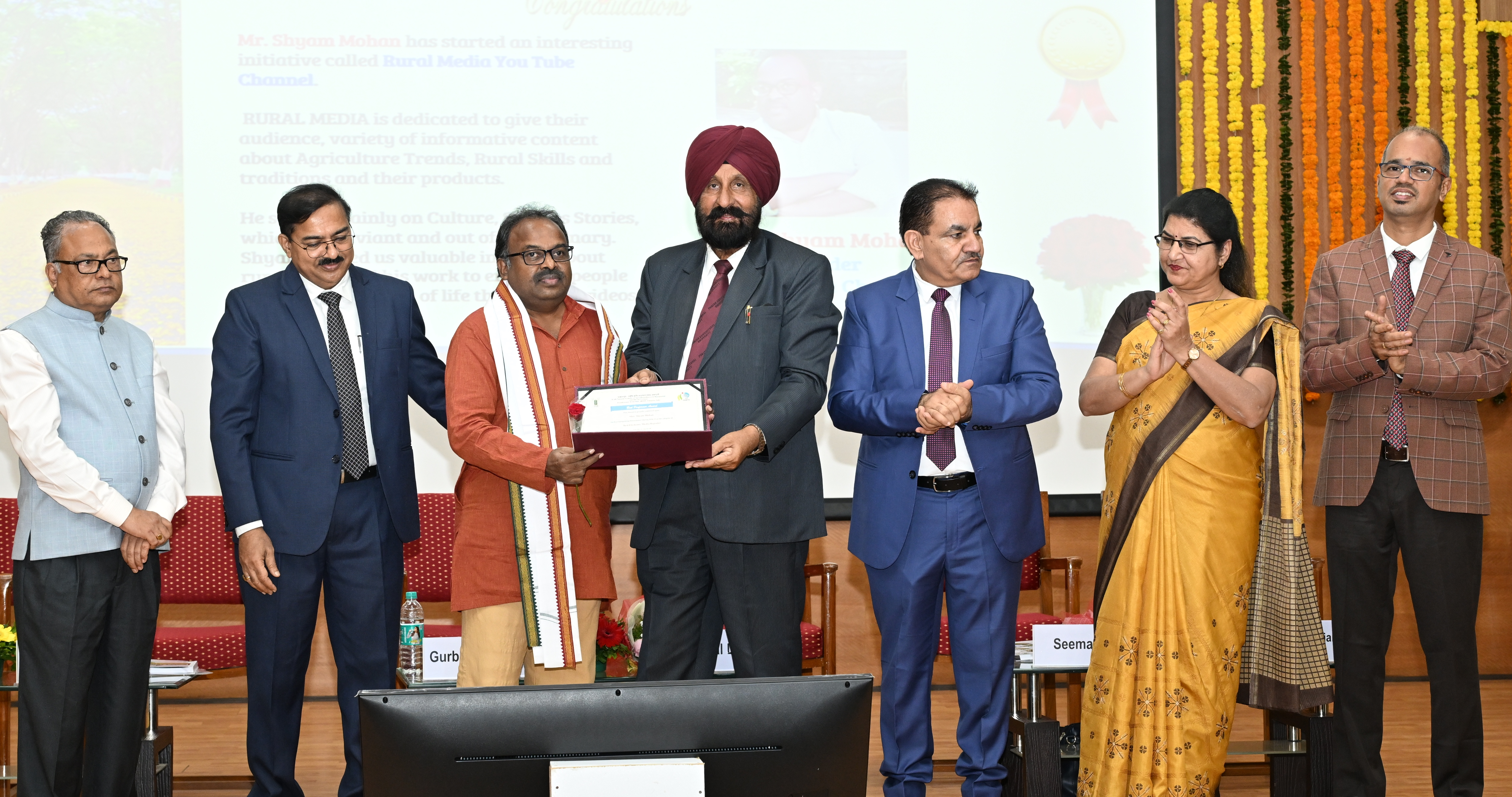
Shyam Mohan Receiving Best Digital Media Journalist Award (2025) at ICAR-NAARM 50th Foundation Day

He also worked as a political cartoonist from 1989 to 2000 with Andhra Jyothi daily. As a freelance cartoonist, his work has been published in international platforms such as E+Z Entwicklungspolitik (Germany), Wendekreis (Switzerland), and Dritte Welt (Germany).

== Awards and Recognition ==
Journalism:

Rythu Nestham Best Journalist Award (2017), presented by M. Venkaiah Naidu, Vice President of India

Telugu University Keerthi Puraskaram (2021) – Best Journalist

Achievement Award for Journalism (2023), presented by S. Abdul Nazeer, Governor of Andhra Pradesh

Best Digital Media Journalist Award (2025) at ICAR-NAARM 50th Foundation Day

Cartooning:

First Prize, Swati Weekly Cartoon Contest (1984)

First Prize, All India Radio 'Radio Date Poster Competition' (1991)

Best TV Cartoon Award (1991), presented by the Governor of Andhra Pradesh

- Find sources for "Shyam Mohan" ( you must add "+" between words for phrase search ) : Mohan gbooks, Mohan%22&scope=books&FORM=BBBB msbooks, Mohan gscholar, Mohan%22&scope=academic&FORM=BCBB msacademic, Mohan gnews current, Mohan gnews archives
