= Pinapaka Pattinagar =

Pinapaka Pattinagar Pinapaka Patti Nagar
- village
- Location in Telangana, India
- Coordinates: 17°37′28″N 80°47′8″E
- Country: India
- State: Telangana

Languages
  - Official: Telugu
- Time zone: UTC+5:30 (IST)

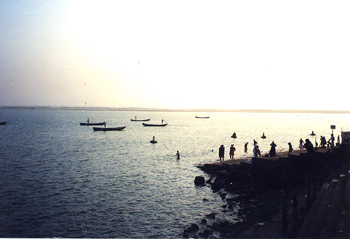
The Godavari River, adjacent to the town of Kovvur

Pinapaka Patti Nagar is a small village in Burgampahad mandal in Khammam district, Telangana. On one side of the village, Kinnerasaani is there, which is the tributary of Godavari river. Literacy rate in this village is 40-60%. Most of the people are dependent on agriculture for a living and food.

Total population of the village is 1693 (as per 2011 census), male population is 856 and female population is 837. Total ST population is 242 (14.29%). Total area of the village is 683.11 hectares (1,688.0 acres).
