= Mittagudem =

- Village
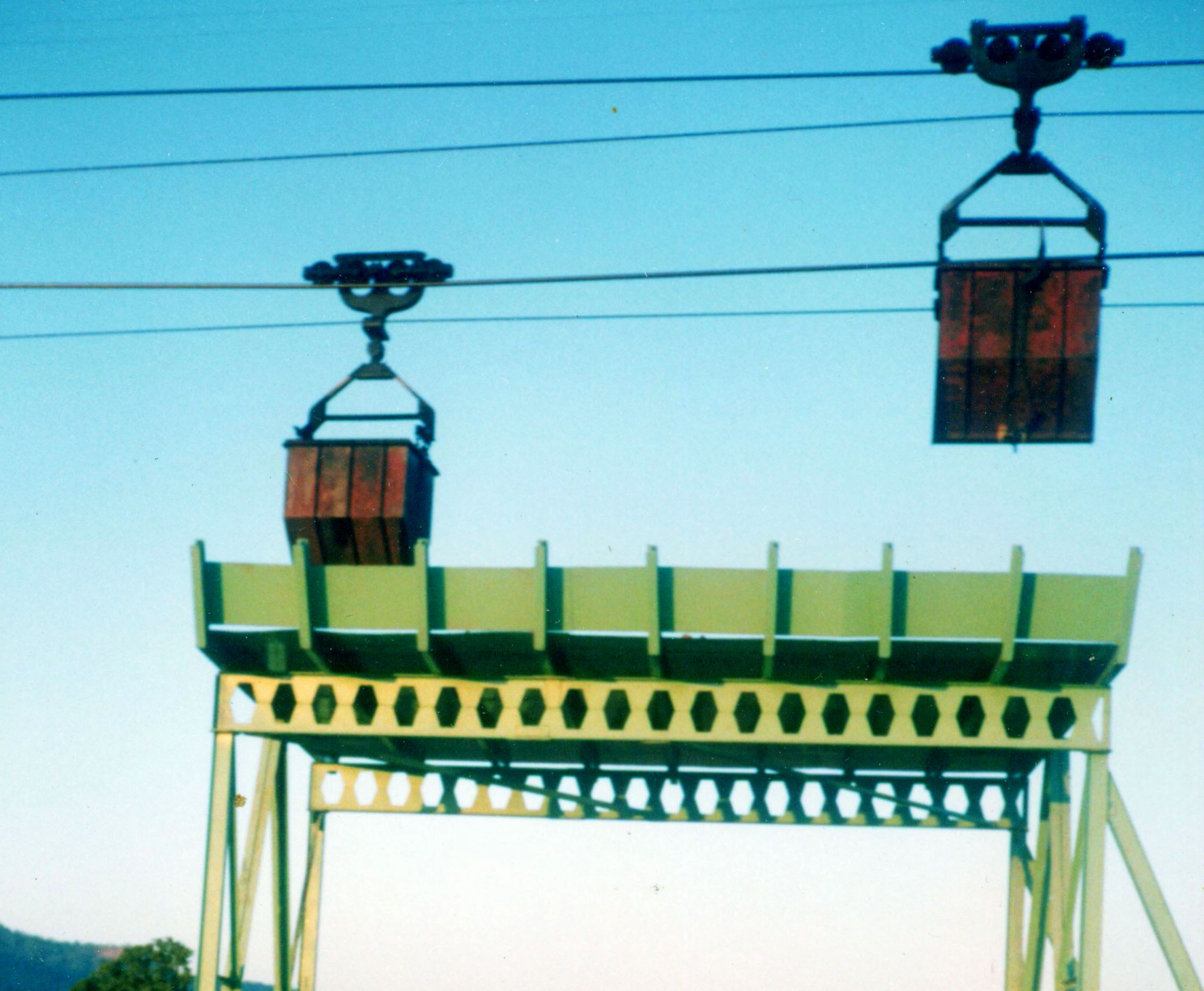
- Coal Handling Ropeway (supply of coal from Manuguru open cast mine to Aswapuram, Heavy Water Plant)
- Country: India
- State: Telangana
- District: Khammam

Languages
  - Official: Telugu
- Time zone: UTC+5:30 (IST)
- PIN: 507116
- Vehicle registration: TS
- Nearest city: Manuguru
- Vidhan Sabha constituency: Pinapaka
- Climate: hot (Köppen)

Mittagudem is a small village in Aswapuram Mandal, Khammam District, Telangana, India.
