= Janakipuram =

Coordinates: 17°57′N 79°22′E

Janakipuram is a village located in Chandrugonda mandal, Khammam district, Telangana, India.
