= Uppaka =

Uppaka Uppaka
- Village
- Location in Peddapalli dist, Telangana, India
- Coordinates: 18.0269°N 80.7042°E
- Country: India
- State: Telangana
- District: Bhadradri Kothagudem
- Mandal: Pinapaka

Languages
  - Official: Telugu
- Time zone: UTC+5:30 (IST)
- PIN: 507117
- Vehicle registration: TS
- Website: telangana.gov.in

Uppaka is a village in Pinapaka Mandal in Bhadradri Kothagudem district of Telangana state, India. It belongs to Telangana region . It is located 2 km (1.2 mi) from Pinapaka
