= Rega Kantha Rao =

Indian politician

Rega Kantha Rao (born 1977) is an Indian politician from Telangana state. He is a former two time Member of the Legislative Assembly representing the Indian National Congress from Pinapaka Assembly constituency, which is reserved for the Scheduled Tribe community, in the erstwhile Khammam district, later reorganised as Bhadradri Kothagudem district. He was a member of the Andhra Pradesh Legislative Assembly in 2009 and the Telangana Legislative Assembly in 2018.

== Early life and education ==
Rao was born on 9 April 1977 to Borraiah. He completed his BA at Dr. Ambedkar Open University, Hyderabad in 2000. Later hid did a Diploma in physical education the Government Physical Education College, Dhomalaguda, Hyderabad in 2005.

== Career ==
Rao won the Pinapaka Assembly constituency in the 2009 Andhra Pradesh Legislative Assembly election representing the Indian National Congress. He polled 40,028 votes and defeated his nearest rival, Payam Venkateswarlu of the Communist Party of India, by a margin of 349 votes. He became an MLA for the second time on the Congress ticket winning the 2018 Telangana Legislative Assembly election where he polled 72,283 and defeated TRS candidate Venkateswarlu again, by a margin of 19,565 votes. He later shifted to Bharat Rashtra Samithi and contested the 2023 Telangana Legislative Assembly election on BRS ticket but lost to Venkateswarlu, this time around by a margin of 34,506 votes. In 2019, he was selected as the government whip.

A criminal case filed against him by a media professional was quashed by the High Court in October 2026.
