= Nagupalli =

- Village
- Country: India
- State: Telangana

Population
  - Total: 7,000

Languages
  - Official: Telugu
- Time zone: UTC+5:30 (IST)
- Vehicle registration: TS
- Nearest city: Sathupalli
- Lok Sabha constituency: Khammam
- Vidhan Sabha constituency: Vemsoor (1952-1972)
- Vidhan Sabha constituency: Sathupalli (from 1972
- Avg. summer temperature: 48 °C (118 °F)
- Avg. winter temperature: 21 °C (70 °F)
- Website: www.sathupally.in

Nagupalli is a village in Dammapeta mandal which in Khammam district which is in Telangana state. Population of Nagupalli is approximately 7000. Main livelihood for the people is farming.
