= KTPS =

KTPS may refer to:

- KTPS (FM), a radio station in Pagosa Springs, Colorado, U.S.
- KBTC-TV, originally KTPS, a television station in Tacoma, Washington, U.S.
- Kothagudem Thermal Power Station, a power plant located in Telangana, India
