= Apparaopeta =

Village in Dammapeta Mandal, Bhadradri Kottagudem District, Telangana, India

Apparaopeta is a village located in Dammapeta Mandal, Bhadradri Kottagudem District, Telangana of India. Around 150 Telugu speaking families live in this village. The village is located 3 kilometers from Khammam-Rajamundry highway and 4 kilometers from Mandal headquarters. In 2016, Telangana State Oil Federation founded an oil palm factory. The factory produces 30 tonnes per hour at an estimated outlay of Rs. 62.

Agriculture is a key industry in Apparaopeta. Key crops include Rice, Sugarcane, Corn, Oil palm, Mango, and Cashew Nuts. Agricultural production is dependent on seasonal rains and underground bore water. Unlike other districts of Telangana state, the Bhadradri Kottagudem region does not have water shortage issues. The region is covered by thick forestation known for the keeping the villages cool and climate balanced.

Beginning in 2010, Telangana State Oil Federation was instrumental in developing the village's road infrastructure in the interest of transporting oil palm products. Apparaopeta still lacks many public facilities, including a hospital. Public buildings in the village include a primary school (Telugu Medium), Sri Ram Temple, grocery stores, and a drinking water tanker. A mobile network is in place four kilometers from Apparaopeta. Much of this development has been thanks to Telangana state politician Thummala Nageshwararao.
