= Chunchupalle =

- Census Town
- Location in Telangana, India Chunchupalle (India)
- Coordinates: 17°31′25″N 80°36′18″E
- Country: India
- State: Telangana
- District: Bhadradri Kothagudem

Area
  - Total: 8.50 km^{2} (3.28 sq mi)

Population (2011)
  - Total: 19,944
  - Density: 2,350/km^{2} (6,080/sq mi)

Languages
  - Official: Telugu
- Time zone: UTC+5:30 (IST)
- Vehicle registration: TS
- Website: telangana.gov.in

Chunchupalle is a census town in Bhadradri Kothagudem district of the Indian state of Telangana. It is located in Chunchupalli mandal of Kothagudem revenue division.

== Demographics ==
As of 2001 India census, Chunchupalle had a population of 18,967. Males constitute 50% of the population and females 50%. Chunchupalle has an average literacy rate of 70%, higher than the national average of 59.5%: male literacy is 76% and, female literacy is 63%. In Chunchupalle, 11% of the population is under 6 years of age.
