= Kakatiya Thermal Power Station =

Power station in Telangana, India

Kakatiya Thermal Power Project at Bhupalpalle
- Official name: KTPP
- Country: India
- Location: Ghanpur, Warangal district, Telangana
- Coordinates: 18°23′15″N 79°50′22″E
- Status: Operational
- Commission date: Unit 1: February 2009 'Under implementation' Unit 2: 2013
- Operator: Telangana Power Generation Corporation (TGGENCO)

Thermal power station
- Primary fuel: Coal

Power generation
- Units operational: 1X500 MW 'Under implementation' 1X600
- Nameplate capacity: 500 MW 'Under implementation' 600 MW

Kakatiya Thermal Power Station is located near Chelpur village of Ghanpur mandal in Jayashankar Bhupalpally district of the Indian state of Telangana. The power plant is one of the coal based power plants of TGGENCO

== Plant ==
This power plant was developed in 2 stages. The first stage comprised one 500 MW unit. The unit was synchronized to grid with oil firing on 31.03.2010 at 06:08 hrs. Coal firing was immediately taken up and the load was raised up to 84 MW and the unit was in service with this load for about 1 hour.

Kakatiya TPP Unit-II 1×600 MW, was synchronized to the grid at 03:00 hrs. on 22 October 2015 and loaded to 105 MW.

== Capacity ==
Stage	Unit Number	Installed Capacity (MW)	Date of Commissioning	Status
Stage I	1	500	May, 2010	Running
Stage II	2	600	Jan, 2016	Running

== See also ==
- List of Power Stations in Telangana
