= Lower Jurala Hydro Electric Project =

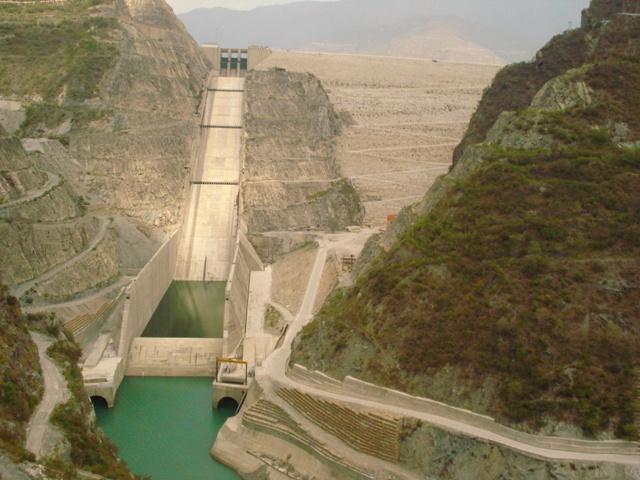
- Lower Jurala Hydro Electric Project

- Location within Telangana Location within India
- Official name: Lower Jurala Hydro Electric Project
- Location: Mulamalla Village, Jogulamba Gadwal district, Telangana
- Coordinates: 16°18′47″N 77°46′38″E
- Purpose: Power
- Status: Under construction
- Construction began: 13 November 2008
- Construction cost: Est Rs.1474.83 Crores

Dam and spillways
- Impounds: Krishna River

Lower Jurala Hydro Electric Project
- Operator: TSGENCO
- Commission date: Unit-1 29 December 2013 Unit-2 10 January 2014; Unit-3 28 July 2016; Unit-4 28 July 2016; Unit-5 September 2016 Unit-6 September 2016
- Type: Run-of-the-river
- Turbines: 6 x 40 MW (54,000 hp)Bulb type
- Installed capacity: 240 MW (320,000 hp)
- Website http://tsgenco.telangana.gov.in/

Lower Jurala Hydro Electric Project is a major on-going Hydro Electric Project near Mulamalla Village, Atmakur Mandal, Jogulamba Gadwal district, Telangana. The project construction was started in 2008, planned to completed it by 2014. But due to the delay it may completed by end of 2015. There will be 6 units, each can produce 40 MW power. The first unit was synchronized in December 2013 and the second unit was synchronized in January 2014 and connected to the grid.

Due to the quality issues in gates, along with units 1&2, unit-3 nearing erection completion and assemblies in various stages were inundated on 30 July 2014 late night flood water released from Jurala Project.

Units 3 and 4 were commissioned and declared of commercial operation of 40 MW each unit on 28 July 2016 confirmed by Mr. Venkata Rajam, COD Hydel, Telangana State Genco.

== See also ==
- List of hydroelectric power station failures
