= Kothagudem Municipal Corporation =

Local civic body in Kothagudem, Telangana, India

Type
- Type: Municipal Corporation of the Kothagudem

Leadership
- Mayor: M. Ganesh, CPI
- Deputy Mayor: S. Lalitha Kumari, INC

Structure
- Seats: 60
- Political groups: Government (50): CPI (22); INC (22); CPI(M) (1); IND (5); Opposition (10): BRS (8); BJP (1); IND (1)

Elections
- Last election: 2026

Website
- Kothagudem Municipal Corporation

The Kothagudem Municipal Corporation is the local governing body, administering the city of Kothagudem, Bhadradri Kothagudem district in the Indian state of Telangana.

The municipal corporation consists of democratically elected members, is headed by a mayor and administers the city's governance, infrastructure and administration. This city is selected under central government scheme of AMRUT.
