= Bhadrachalam Road railway station =

Railway station in Telangana, India

Bhadrachalam Road

General information
- Location: Kothagudem, Bhadradri Kothagudem district Telangana; India
- Coordinates: 17.5500°N 80.6300°E
- Elevation: 117 metres (384 ft)
- System: Express train and Passenger train station
- Owner: Indian Railways
- Operator: South Central Railway zone
- Line: Dornakal–Manuguru line
- Platforms: 3
- Tracks: 6
- Bus stands: 1
- Bus operators: TSRTC

Construction
- Structure type: Standard (at ground)
- Parking: Available

Other information
- Status: Functional
- Station code: BDCR
- Zone(s): South Central Railway zone
- Division(s): Secunderabad
- Fare zone: South Central Railway zone
- Website: http://www.indianrailways.gov.in
Location
- Location within Telangana Location within India

Bhadrachalam Road railway station (station code:BDCR) is a fourth grade non-suburban (NSG–4) category Indian railway station in Secunderabad railway division of South Central Railway zone. It serves Kothagudem in Bhadradri Kothagudem district of the Indian state of Telangana. It was selected as one of the 21 stations to be developed under Amrit Bharat Stations scheme.

== Overview ==
Kothagudem Railway Station is referred to as Bhadrachalam Road. This is one of the oldest railway stations in the Telangana. The train route initially started here for transporting coal to different parts of Nizam state. Later they started passenger Express trains to Hyderabad, Warangal, Vijayawada, Balharshah etc.
