= Yadadri Thermal Power Plant =

Thermal power project plant in India

- Official name: Yadadri TPS
- Country: India
- Location: Dameracherla, Nalgonda district, Telangana
- Coordinates: 16°42′25″N 79°34′44″E
- Status: operational
- Construction began: October 2017
- Construction cost: ₹25,099 Crores (USD $3.8 billion)
- Owner: TGGENCO
- Operator: TGGENCO

Thermal power station
- Primary fuel: Coal

Power generation
- Nameplate capacity: 4000 MW

External links
- Website: tggenco.com/TGGENCO/home.do;jsessionid=8EC63E2115534D60C1EEAD4E13F1A383

Yadadri Thermal Power Plant is an operational 2400 megawatt, supercritical thermal power plant situated in Dameracherla, Nalgonda district in Telangana, India. Two more units of 800 MW each are under construction here. The project is second largest in South India, at a cost of ₹25,099 crores (US$3.8 billion) and was earlier expected to complete by October 2021 in a phased manner. The state-owned Telangana Power Generation Corporation Limited (TGGENCO) is operating the current 3x 800 mega thermal power station, built on 2800 acres near Veerlapalem Village in Nalgonda District, the second mega project announced by the Telangana government after Bhadradri Thermal Power Plant.

== History ==
Chief Minister of Telangana, K. Chandrashekar Rao laid the foundation stone for the project on 8 June 2015 at Veerlapalem village, Dhamacherla mandal. The name was rechristened from Damaracharla Thermal Power Plant as Yadadri.

== The Project ==
The BHEL order, the largest ever in India for the company, includes design, supply, erection and commissioning of project on EPC basis. The project completion is executed on fast track basis within 36 months for first two units and balance three units in 48 months from October 2017. This is the biggest project executed by BHEL.

== Clearances ==
The project has been accorded environmental clearance by the Ministry of Environment, Forest and Climate Change (MoEF&CC)in June 2017 and yet to get water allocation from the Krishna River.

MoEF granted Environment clearance to this thermal power plant on June 29, 2017. LOI issued to BHEL with zero date 17 October 2017. The revised environment norms at the center, the 4000 MW project will cost Telangana an additional ₹3100 crore. The new environment norms mandate setting-up of flue-gas desulfurization (FGD) devices.

== Capacity ==
The planned capacity of the thermal power plant is 4000 MW (5 × 800 MW)

Stage	Unit Number	Installed Capacity (MW)	Date of Commissioning	Status
Stage I	Unit I	800 MW	31 Dec 2023	operational
Stage I	Unit II	800 MW	31 Dec 2023	operational
Stage II	Unit III	800 MW	30 June 2024	operational
Stage II	Unit IV	800 MW	30 June 2024	work commenced
Stage II	Unit V	800 MW	30 June 2024	work commenced
