= Palwancha =

- Town
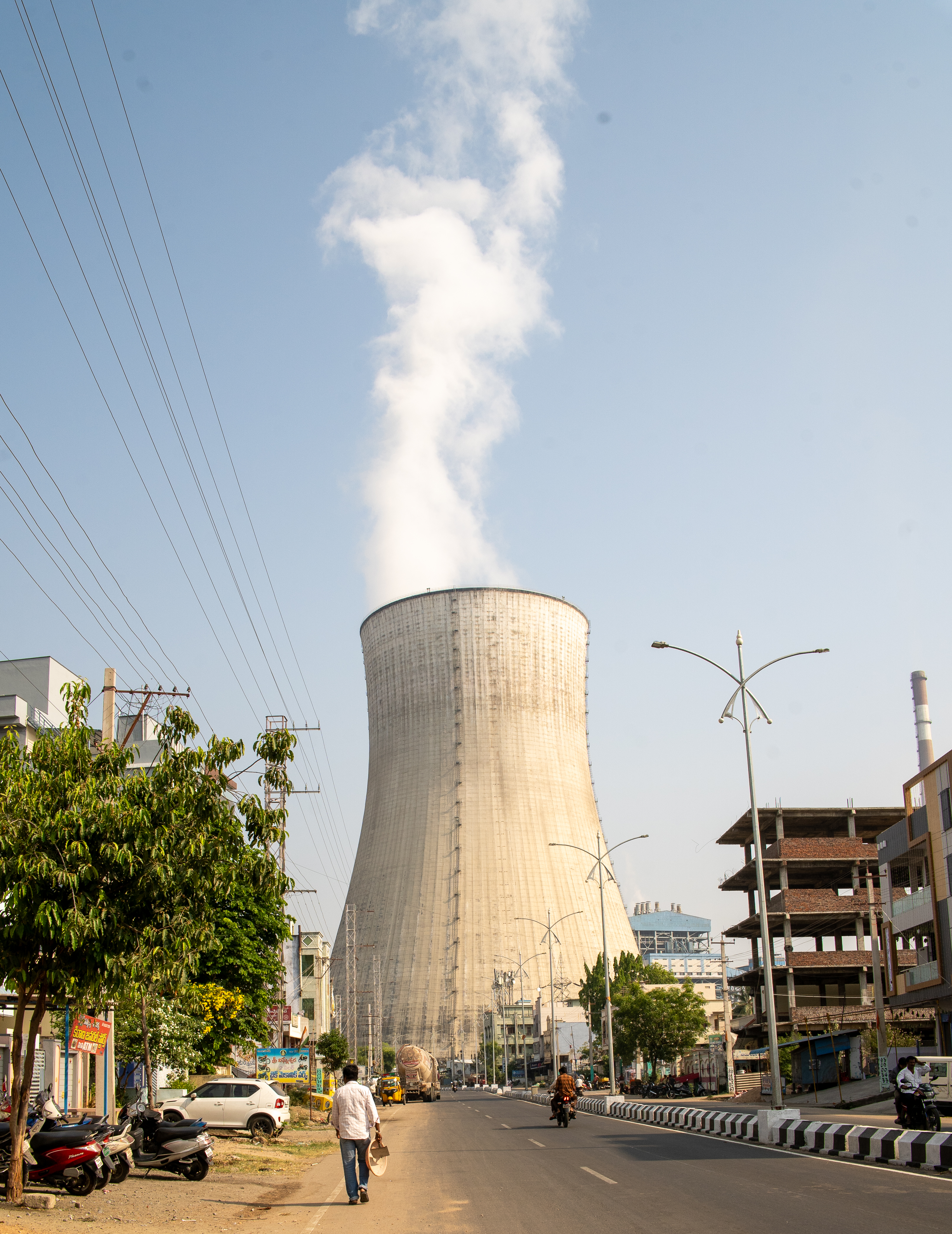
- View of Kothagudem Thermal Power Station [KTPS] cooling tower

- Location in Telangana, India Palwancha (India)
- Coordinates: 17.600131°N 80.704213°E
- Country: India
- State: Telangana
- District: Bhadradri Kothagudem

Government
  - Type: Municipal Corporation
  - Body: Kothagudem Municipal Corporation

Area
  - Total: 26.38 km^{2} (10.19 sq mi)
- Elevation: 107 m (351 ft)

Population (2011)
  - Total: 80,199
  - Density: 3,040/km^{2} (7,874/sq mi)

Languages
  - Official: Telugu
- Time zone: UTC+5:30 (IST)
- Postal code: 507115
- Area code: 08744
- Vehicle registration: TS28
- Website: palvancha.in

Palvancha is a town and a major part in the Kothagudem Municipal Corporation in Bhadradri district of the Indian state of Telangana.It was a portion of large Zamindari estate known as Hasanabad Paragana of Qutub shahi dynasty and Palvancha Zamindari in the Nizam's Dominion. Estate name was given by Captain Glasfurd. The Zamindar of Bhadrachalam was Zamindar of Palvancha also. It is a twin city of Kothagudem and an industrialized area with industries including Kothagudem Thermal Power Station, NMDC, TSIIC Industrial Park, etc.

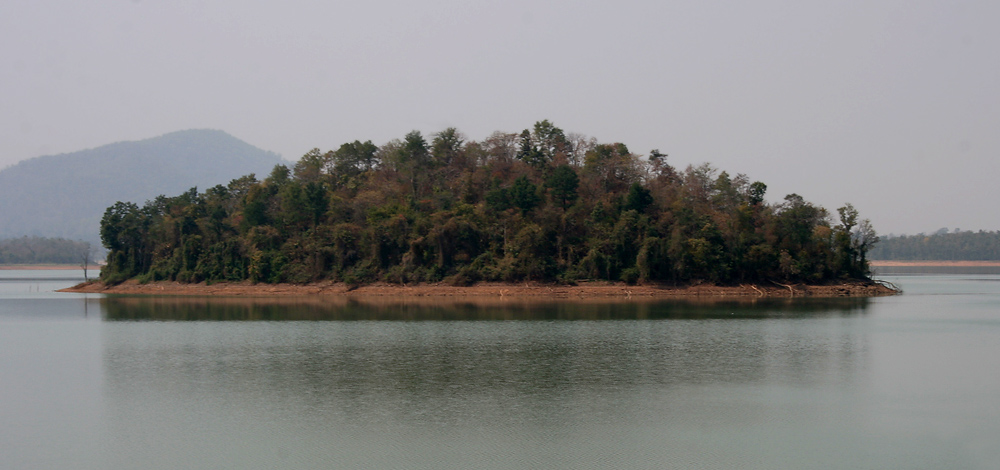
A view from Kinnerasani Dam in Kinnerasani Wildlife Sanctuary

Kancharla Gopanna, also known as Bhakta Ramadasu, was a saint and composer who was the Tahsildar of Palwancha (Hasanabad Paragana) during the reign of Abdul Hasan Tana Shah, the Qutubshahi ruler. His metarnal uncles, Akka na and Madanna, held prominent positions in the court of the Sultans of Golconda. Gopanna's connection to Palwancha is primarily through his role as the Tahsildar, a government official responsible for land revenue collection. He is also known for his devotion to Lord Rama and his construction of the Sita Ramachandraswamy Temple in Bhadrachalam, which is in the area of Palwancha.

== Demographics ==
Palvancha is a part of Kothaga dem municipal corporation in Bhadradri district, Telangana. Earlier, it was an independent Municipal Council, which was divided into 39 wards for which elections are held every 5 years. The Palvancha Municipality had population of 130,199 of which 49,923 are males while 50,276 are females as per report released by Census India 2014.

The population of children aged 0–6 is 12,207 which is 10.23% of total population of Palvancha. In Palvancha Municipality, the female Sex ratio is 1009 against state average of 993. Moreover, the child sex ratio in Palvancha is around 970 compared to Andhra Pradesh state average of 939. The literacy rate of Palvancha city is 77.70% higher than the state average of 67.02%. In Palvancha, male literacy is around 84.41% while the female literacy rate is 71.09%.

Palvancha municipality has total administration over 20,782 houses to which it supplies basic amenities like water and sewage. It is also authorized to build roads within municipality limits and impose taxes on properties within its jurisdiction. Kothagudem Thermal Power Station (KTPS) is located in Palvancha. In late 2025, Telangana government has merged Kothagudem Municipality and Palwancha Municipality and formed the Kothagudem Municipal Corporation with 60 divisions. The first election was held to the municipal corporation in 2026 and Communist Party of India was able to make its member as first Mayor of Kothagudem Municipal Corporation.

Festivals are celebrated with much fervor and people used to go to temples on these days to offer special prayers. Some of the festivals are Dasara, Eid ul fitr, Bakrid, Ugadi, Makara Sankranti, Guru Purnima, Sri Rama Navami, Hanuman Jayanti, Raakhi Pournami, Vinayaka Chaviti, Nagula Panchami, Krishnashtami, Deepavali, Mukkoti Ekadasi, Karthika Purnima and Ratha Saptami. People in Palvancha not only celebrate the main festivals, but also celebrate certain regional festivals like Bonalu, Batukamma all over Telangana districts, Yedupayala Jatara in Medak, Sammakka Saralamma in Warangal district.

== Transport ==
=== Road ===
Palvancha is well connected to major cities and towns in Telangana and Andhra Pradesh.

TSRTC operates buses to various destinations from Khammam bus station of the city. National Highway 30 passes through this town.

=== Rail ===
Palvancha has no railway station. It is located between Kothagudem Railway Station (known as Bhadrachalam Road/ BDCR Road) and Manuguru Railway Station line of the South Central Railway. The nearest railway station is Kothagudem Railway Station (Bhadrachalam Road. Station Code is BDCR).

== Education ==
Palvancha town has proper educational facilities for students. There are many government schools known as Zilla Parishad High Schools and EMRS Palvancha (a school for ST students, run by the Govt. of India) as well as private schools including, D.A.V Model School run by TSGENCO, NavaBharat Public School, Regina Carmeli Convent High School, Triveni Talent School, and Al-Kausar School. Engineering colleges like Kakatiya University College of Engineering, ABIT Engineering College, and KLR Institutions are located around Palvancha city. It also has other institutions like Pharmacy, MBA, and MCA Colleges. NDC & KLR Degree and PG College also conducts archaeological research on megalithic sites.

The University College of Engineering, Kakatiya University is located at Palvancha City outskirts.

== Tourism ==
Palvancha town has tourism spots like Kinnerasani Wildlife Sanctuary, and boat riding facility in Kinnerasani dam also sanctioned by Telangana Tourism Development Corporation
