= Telangana II Solar Power Plant =

Indian power utility

Telangana II
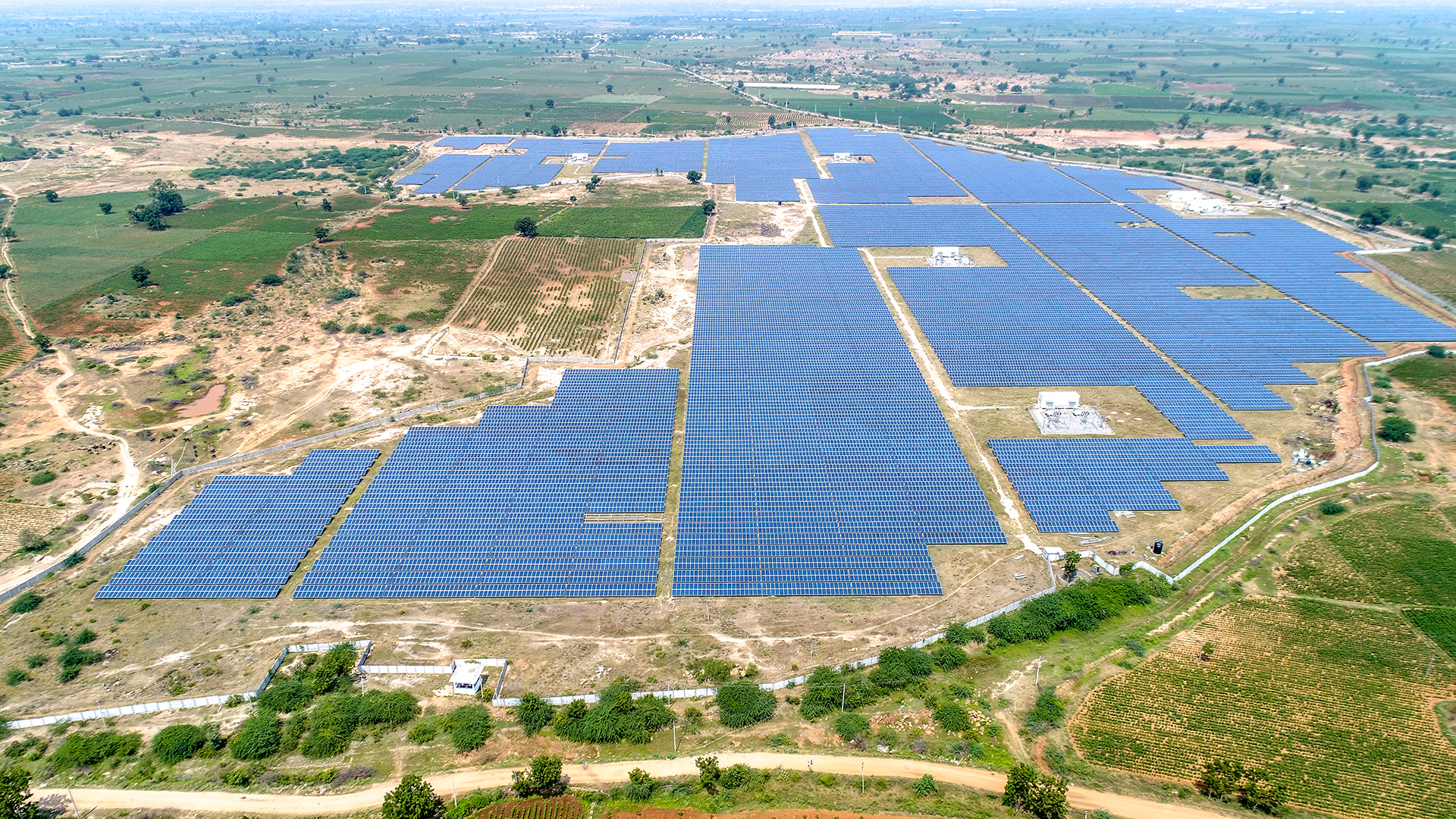
- Country: India
- Location: Gadwal, Mahbubnagar district, Telangana
- Coordinates: 16°9′10″N 77°45′56″E
- Status: Operational
- Commission date: 1 June 2016; 9 years ago
- Owner: Talettutayi Solar Projects Private Limited

Solar farm
- Type: Standard PV
- Collectors: 38,430
- Total collector area: 40 acres

Power generation
- Nameplate capacity: 12 MW_{DC}

Location of Power Plant Telangana II in the State of Telangana

The solar park Telangana II is at Palwai village near Gadwal in the Mahbubnagar district of Telangana. It is a 12 megawatt (MWD_{C}) photovoltaic power station, commissioned in June 2016. It is in direct neighbourhood to its sister project Telangana I. Telangana II was constructed using 38,430 solar modules. The plant covers an area of 40 acres (16 hectares) and supplies about 18,000 people with energy. The estimated reduction of CO_{2} is more than 8,000 metric tons per year.

Owner of the power plant is Solar Arise India Projects Limited, which the shareholders are Thomas Lloyd Group, the European Initiative on Clean, Renewable Energy, Energy Efficiency and Climate Change related to Development SICAV SIF in relation to Global Energy Efficiency and Renewable Energy Fund (“GEEREF”), advised by the European Investment Bank Group, Kotak Mahindra managed Core Infrastructure India Fund (“CIIF”) and the founding management team Anil Nayar, James Abraham and Tanya Singhal. Solar Arise currently owns and operates 130 MW of grid-connected solar power projects in India. The park is operated by Talettutayi Solar Projects Six Private Limited.

The state of telangana has started its “Telangana Solar Power Policy” in 2015 to create "an enabling environment for prospective solar power developers". The government of India has a target of developing 22,000 megawatts (7.507×10^{10} British thermal units per hour) of solar power plants and an additional 8,000 megawatts (2.730×10^{10} British thermal units per hour) is expected in local generation, bringing the total to 30,000 megawatts (1.0236×10^{11} British thermal units per hour) by 2022, which was later increased to 100,000 megawatts by the Narendra Modi government in the 2015 Union budget of India.
