= Chandrugonda =

Village in Telangana, India

Coordinates: 17°26′37″N 80°28′34″E

Chandrugonda is a village in Chandrugonda mandal in Bhadradri Kothagudem district of Telangana, India.

== Demographics ==
According to the 2011 Indian census, the demographic details of Chandrugonda village are:-

- Total population: 6,822 in 1,803 households
- Male population: 3,382 and female population: 3,440 giving a ratio of 1017
- Children under 6-years of age: 655 = 9.6% of the population
- Literacy rate = 62.56% - below the state average of 67.02%
