= Karakagudem =

Coordinates: 18°02′15″N 80°34′40″E

Karakagudem is an agency mandal in Bhadradri Kothagudem district, Telangana, India.
