= Sarapaka =

Sarapaka Census town
- Location in Telangana, India Sarapaka (India)
- Coordinates: 17°41′32″N 80°51′41″E
- Country: India
- State: Telangana
- District: Bhadradri Kothagudem district

Population (2001)
  - Total: 16,973

Languages
  - Official: Telugu
- Time zone: UTC+5:30 (IST)
- PIN: 507128
- Vehicle registration: TS 28
- Website: telangana.gov.in

Sarapaka is a census town in Bhadradri Kothagudem district in the Indian state of Telangana which is in the national highway 30. It is in Pinapaka assembly constituency and in Mahabubabad Loksabha Constituency.

== Demographics ==
As of 2001 India census, Sarapaka had a population of 16,973 but actual population is approximately 40,000+. Males constitute 51% of the population and females 49%. Sarapaka has an average literacy rate of 70%, higher than the national average of 59.5%: male literacy is 73%, and female literacy is 58%. In Sarapaka, 13% of the population is under 6 years of age.

== Temples ==
Mutyalamma temple is the famous goddess which is called in Telugu as "Grama Devatha". Offerings are given to goddess in the form of "bali" along with Chakrapongali. There is a special utsav done during Dussehra and in sravana month. Other temples are Sri Satyanarayana Temple, Vinayaka Temple, Shirdi Sai Baba Temple, Krishna Temple etc.
