= Gundala mandal, Bhadradri Kothagudem district =

Gundala
- Mandal
- Location in Telangana, India Gundala (India)
- Coordinates: 17.9084°N 80.5159°E
- Country: India
- State: Telangana
- District: Bhadradri Kothagudem

Languages
  - Official: Telugu
- Time zone: UTC+5:30 (IST)
- Vehicle registration: TS

Gundala is a mandal of Bhadradri Kothagudem District of Telangana state in India. It is located at and is near the town of Kothagudem. The headquarters of the sub-division are in the village of Gundala. The sub-division has 17 villages under its administration. Markode, Muthapuram and Lingagudem are the other populated regions in the mandal.

== History ==
Kistapuram and Padugonigudem villages in Gundala Taluk of the district were rich in Megalithic cultural remnants explored and discovered recently.

== Population ==
Gundala sub-division has a population of 23,817, while the village of Gundala has a population of 2,813 (2001 census)

== Literacy ==
The subdivision has a literacy rate of 35.1%, while the village of Gundala has a literacy rate of 48.1% .(2001 census) The subdivision shows a low literacy rate as compared to the Khammam district's average.

== Villages in Gundala mandal ==
- Adavi Ramavaram
- Allapalle
- Ananthogu
- Chinna Venkatapuram
- Damarathogu
- Dongathogu
- Galaba
- Gundala
- Jagguthanda
- Kachanapalle
- Konavarigudem
- Lingagudem
- Mamakannu
- Markodu
- Muthapuram
- Pedda Venkatapuram
- Ramanujagudem
- Rayalankapadu
- Rayapadu
- Sayanapalle
- Settipalle
- Tirlapuram
- Narsapuram Thanda
- Rollagadda Thanda
- Narsapuram
