= Aswaraopeta =

Aswaraopeta అశ్వారావుపేట
- Mandal
- Location in Telangana, India Aswaraopeta (India)
- Coordinates: 17.2500°N 81.1333°E
- Country: India
- State: Telangana
- District: Kothagudem
- Elevation: 166 m (545 ft)

Languages
  - Official: Telugu
- Time zone: UTC+5:30 (IST)
- PIN: 507301
- Telephone code: 08740
- Vehicle registration: TS28
- Lok Sabha constituency: Khammam
- Vidhan Sabha constituency: Aswaraopeta
- Climate: hot (Köppen)
- Website: telangana.gov.in

Aswaraopeta is a mandal in Bhadradri Kothagudem district, Telangana.

== Geography ==
Ashwaraopeta is located at 17.2500°N 81.1333°E.
