= Telangana Power Generation Corporation Limited =

Indian power generating organization

Telangana Power Generation Corporation Limited (TGPGCL)
- Type: Public Sector Undertaking
- Industry: Electricity generation
- Founded: 2 June 2014
- Headquarters: Hyderabad, Telangana, India
- Key people: SANDEEP KUMAR SULTANIA, I.A.S., (Chairman And Managing Director)(FAC)
- Products: Electricity
- Website: https://tggenco.com/TGGENCO/home.do;jsessionid=8EC63E2115534D60C1EEAD4E13F1A383

The Telangana Power Generation Corporation Limited (TGPGCL) is responsible for power generation in the state of Telangana. It has ceased to do power trading and has retained with powers of controlling system operations of power generation after formation of Telangana state.

Telangana Power Generation Corporation Limited has been incorporated under companies Act, 2013, on 19 May 2014 and commenced its operations from 2 June 2014.

== History ==
The erstwhile Andhra Pradesh State Electricity Board (APSEB) which came into existence on 1st April 1959 was responsible for generation, transmission and distribution of electricity. APSEB was the successor to Electricity Department of the Government of Andhra Pradesh. Prior to the independence, power was supplied to parts of Telangana by Hyderabad State Electricity Department. Under the Electricity Sector Reforms agenda, government of Andhra Pradesh promulgated Andhra Pradesh Electricity Reforms Act, 1998. The erstwhile APSEB was unbundled into one generating company (APGENCO), one transmission company (APTRANSCO) and four distribution companies (APDISCOMs) as part of the reform process.

Later, on 2 June 2014, when the state was bifurcated, APGENCO distributed all the assets, liabilities and power stations to both the states and Telangana Power Generation Corporation (TGGENCO) was formed for the newly formed Telangana state and APGENCO remained for Andhra Pradesh in accordance with the Andhra Pradesh Reorganisation Act, 2014. All the plants (thermal, hydel and solar) located in Telangana region were transferred to Telangana Genco on an "as is where is" basis.

== Mission ==
- To spearhead accelerated power development by planning and implementing new power projects.
- To generate adequate and reliable power most economically, efficiently and eco-friendly.
- To implement renovation and modernisation of all existing units and enhance their performance.

== Power Plants of TGGENCO ==
The power plants of TGGENCO are

=== Thermal-Coal based ===
Sr. No.	Project	Inst.Capacity (MW)	Total (MW)	Remarks	Gallery
1	Kakatiya TPP	1x500+1x600	1100		
2	Kothagudem TPS	2x250+1x500+1x800	1800		KTPS at Paloncha
4	Bhadradri Thermal Power Plant	4x270	1020 MW		
5	Yadadri Thermal Power Plant	5X800	4000 MW under construction		
Overall installed capacity (MW)			3920		

=== Hydro-Water based ===
Sr. No.	Project	Inst.Capacity (MW)	Total (MW)	Remarks	Gallery
1	Nagarjuna Sagar Main PH	1x110+7x100.8	815.6	7x100.8 MW with pumping features	Power house on the left bank of Nagarjuna Sagar dam
2	Nagarjuna Sagar LCPH	2x30	60		Nagarjuna sagar dam
3	Srisailam LBPH	6x150	900	6x150 MW with pumping features	Srisailam Damm
4	Pochampad PH	4x9	36		Sriram Sagar dam (Pochampad)
5	Singur PH	2x7.5	15		
6	Nizam Sagar PH	2x5	10		Nizam Sagar, Nizamabad
7	Puttamagandi AMRP Lift	4x18		Water pumping station	
8	Paleru Mini Hydel	2x1	2		
9	Peddapalli Mini Hydels	1x9.16	9.16		
10	Lower Jurala HEP	6x40	240		
11	Jurala HEP	6x39	234	50% joint project with Karnataka state	Priyadarshini jurala project
12	Sammakka Sagar HEP	10x24	240	Under Construction	
13	Pulichintala Hydro Project PCHES	4x30	120		
Overall capacity (MW)			2441.76		

=== Non-Conventional Plants ===
Sr. No.	Project	Inst.Capacity (MW)
1	Jurala Solar PV Plant	1
Overall capacity (MW)		1

== See also ==
- List of Power Stations in Telangana
- Transmission Corporation of Telangana
- Solar power in India
- Wind power in India
- Torrefaction
- Central Electricity Authority (India)
- Economics of new nuclear power plants
- Demand response
- National Grid (Great Britain)
- Spark spread
- Electricity market
- Electricity Act (2003)
