= Dammapeta =

Dammapeta Dhanampeta
- Mandal
- Location in Telangana, India Dammapeta (India)
- Coordinates: 17.2667°N 81.0167°E
- Country: India
- State: Telangana
- District: Bhadradri Kothagudem
- Elevation: 267 m (876 ft)

Languages
  - Official: Telugu
- Time zone: UTC+5:30 (IST)
- Postal code: 507306
- Vehicle registration: TS
- Nearest city: Khammam
- Lok Sabha constituency: Khammam
- Vidhan Sabha constituency: Aswaraopeta
- Climate: hot (Köppen)
- Website: telangana.gov.in

Dammapeta is a mandal in Bhadradri Kothagudem district, Telangana.

== Geography ==
Dammapeta is located at 17.2667°N 81.0167°E. It has an average elevation of 206 metres (679 ft). It includes the village of Apparaopeta.
