= Burgampahad =

Burgampadu
- Village
- Location in Telangana, India Burgampadu (India)
- Coordinates: 17.6500°N 80.8667°E
- Country: India
- State: Telangana
- District: Bhadradri Kothagudem
- Elevation: 42 m (138 ft)

Languages
  - Official: Telugu
- Time zone: UTC+5:30 (IST)
- Vehicle registration: TS
- Sasana sabha constituency: Pinapaka
- Website: telangana.gov.in

Burgampadu is the headquarters of Burgampadu mandal in Bhadradri Kothagudem district of the Indian state of Telangana.

== Geography ==
Borgampadu is located at 17.6500°N 80.8667°E. It has an average elevation of 42 metres (141 ft).

== Demographics ==
As of 2011 Census of India, Burgampahad had a population of 10235. The total population constitute, 5078 males and 5157 females with a sex ratio of 1016 females per 1000 males. 970 children are in the age group of 0–6 years, with sex ratio of 925. The average literacy rate stands at 66.03%.

== Administrative divisions ==
Burgampahad Mandal of Bhadradri Kothagudem district, Telangana. Burgampahd mandal has Sarapaka town and list of villages as follows:

S.No	Name of the Village	Population
1	Sarapaka	22,149
2	Burgampahad	10,235
3	Ganapavaram	580
4	Gumpanapalle	179
5	Ibrahimpeta	400
6	Irvendi	1,715
7	Krishna Sagar	2,091
8	Morampalle	10200
9	Mothepattinagar	1,081
10	Nagineniprolu	6,839
11	Nakirapeta	1,074
12	Pinapaka Pattinagar	1,693
13	Ravigudem [Big]	2,845
14	Seetharama Nagar	1,332
15	Sompalle	1,105
16	Sridhara	2,166
17	Uppusaka	2,074

Tekulacheruv

4000
