= Telangana I Solar Power Plant =

Indian power utility

Telangana I
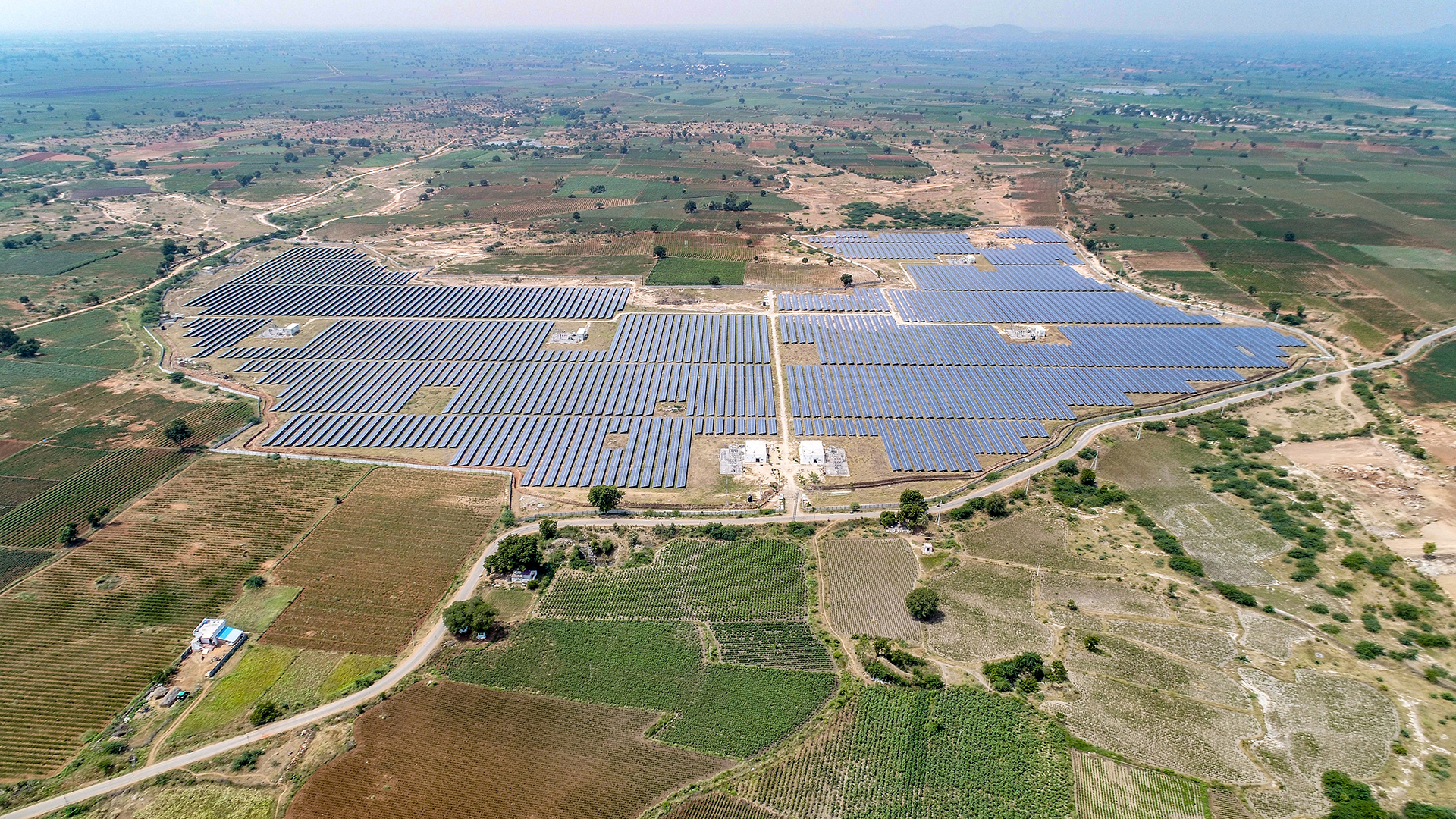
- Country: India
- Location: Gadwal, Mahbubnagar district, Telangana
- Coordinates: 16°9′10″N 77°45′56″E
- Status: Operational
- Commission date: 1 June 2016; 8 years ago
- Owner: Talettutayi Solar Projects Private Limited

Solar farm
- Type: Standard PV
- Total collector area: 40 acres

Power generation
- Units operational: 38,430
- Nameplate capacity: 12 MW_{DC}

External links
- Commons: Related media on Commons

Location of Power Plant Telangana I in the State of Telangana

The solar power plant Telangana I at Palwai village near Gadwal in the Mahbubnagar district of Telangana is a 12 megawatt (MW_{DC}) photovoltaic power station, commissioned in June 2016. Telangana I operates under the SPV Talettutayi Solar Projects Private Limited and was constructed using 38,430 solar modules. It covers an area of 40 acres (16 hectares) and supplies about 18,000 people with energy. The plant was developed by SolarArise India Projects Pvt Limited, which the shareholders are ThomasLloyd Group, the European Initiative on Clean, Renewable Energy, Energy Efficiency and Climate Change related to Development SICAV SIF in relation to Global Energy Efficiency and Renewable Energy Fund (“GEEREF”), advised by the European Investment Bank Group, Kotak Mahindra managed Core Infrastructure India Fund (“CIIF”) and the founding management team Anil Nayar, James Abraham and Tanya Singhal. Solar Arise currently owns and operates 130 MW of grid-connected solar power projects in India.

India has a target of developing 22,000 megawatts (7.507×10^{10} British thermal units per hour) of solar power plants and an additional 8,000 megawatts (2.730×10^{10} British thermal units per hour) is expected in local generation, bringing the total to 30,000 megawatts (1.0236×10^{11} British thermal units per hour) by 2022, which was later increased to 100,000 megawatts by the Narendra Modi government in the 2015 Union budget of India
