= Bhadradri Thermal Power Plant =

Bhadradri Thermal Power Station
- Bhadradri Thermal Power Station Bhadradri Thermal Power Station
- Country: India
- Location: Near Edulla Bayyaram, Manuguru, Khammam, Telangana
- Coordinates: 17.937255°N 80.81852°E
- Status: Commissioned
- Commission date: 9 June 2020
- Owner: TGGENCO
- Operator: Telangana Power Generation Corporation

Thermal power station
- Primary fuel: Coal

Power generation
- Nameplate capacity: 1080 MW

Bhadradri Thermal Power Station is a power plant located near Edulla Bayyaram at Manuguru in the Indian state of Telangana.

== History ==
Former Chief Minister of Telangana Kalvakuntla Chandrashekar Rao laid down foundation stone for this project on 28 March 2015. The project started to help resolve the power crisis in Telangana. TG Govt was planning to make this plant operational within three years. Plant construction is by Bharat Heavy Electricals Limited.

MoEF gave environment clearance to the project on 15 March 2017 and BHEL started EPC works on war footing to complete the first Unit by 2019. The first unit was synchronised on 19 September 2019, full load was achieved on 20 March 2020 and the trial run completed on 5 June 2020.

The project was completed on January 9, 2022 with the commissioning of Unit 4 of the power plant.

== Capacity ==
Unit	Capacity (In MW)	Date of Commissioning	status
1	270	09 Jun 2020	Commissioned
2	270	Dec 2020	Commissioned
3	270	28 March 2021	COD completed
4	270	January 9, 2022	Commissioned
