= Aswapuram =

- Village
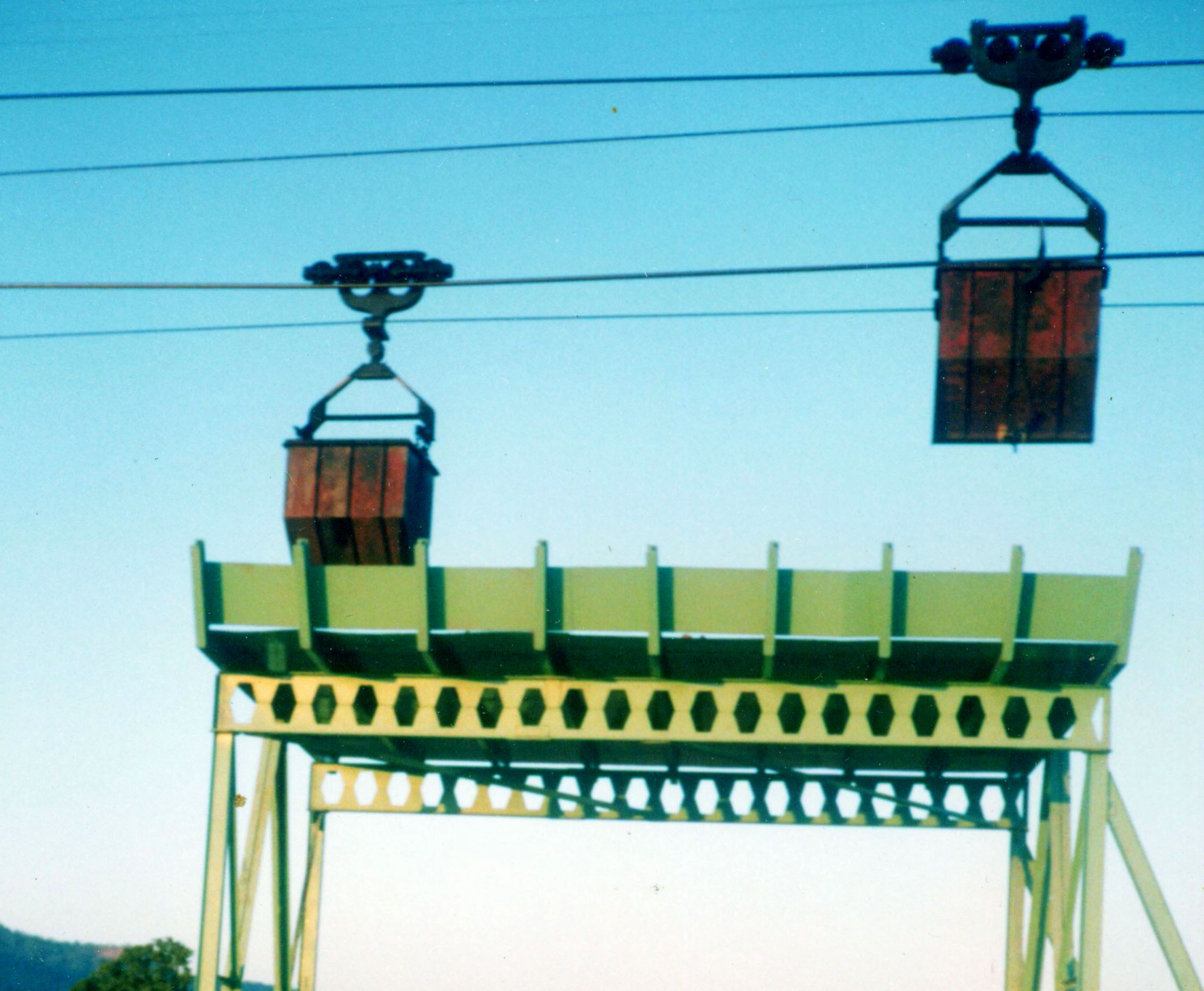
- Coal Handling Ropeway (supply of coal from Manuguru open cast mine to Aswapuram, Heavy Water Plant)

- Location in Telangana, India
- Coordinates: 17°50′6.173″N 80°49′49.45″E
- Country: India
- State: Telangana
- District: Bhadradri Kothagudem

Languages
  - Official: Telugu
- Time zone: UTC+5:30 (IST)
- PIN: 507116
- Vehicle registration: TS
- Nearest city: Manuguru
- Vidhan Sabha constituency: Pinapaka
- Climate: hot (Köppen)
- Website: telangana.gov.in

Aswapuram or Ashwapuram is a Mandal in Bhadradri Kothagudem district, Telangana State, India.

== Institutions ==
- Aswapuram Omsri Adi parasakthi Narayani Siddini Peetam
- Aswapuram Omsakthi Amma Kalyana Mandapam
- Aswapuram Omsakthi Amma Karuna Nilayam
- Atomic Energy Central School
- Atomic Energy Junior College
- State Bank of India
- Govt junior college
- Sri Vidhya Junior College

== Villages ==
The villages in Aswapuram mandal include:

- Amerda
- Ammagaripalli
- Anandapuram
- Aswapuram
- Chintriyala
- Gollagudem
- Gondigudem
- Jaggaram
- Mallelamadugu (Raja Rao Nagar)
- Mittagudem
- Mondikunta
- Nellipaka banjara
- Thummalacheruvu
- Gopalapuram
- Seetharampuram (Muthareddigudem)
