= Kothagudem Thermal Power Station =

Power station in India

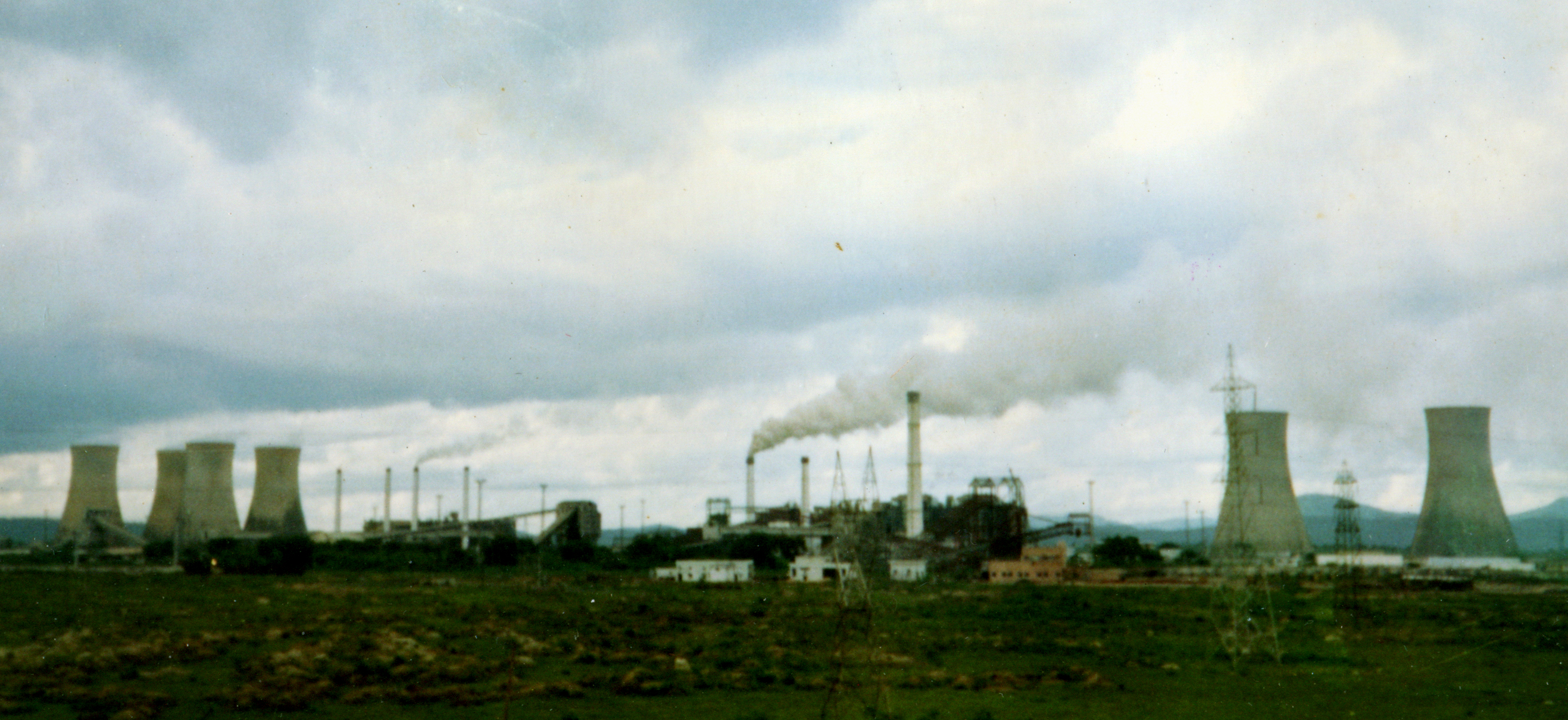
- Far view of Kothagudem Thermal Power station at Paloncha
- Location of the Kothagudem Thermal Power Station
- Country: India
- Location: Paloncha, Khammam, Telangana
- Coordinates: 17.62°N 80.69°E
- Status: Operational
- Commission date: Unit 1: 4 July 1966; Unit 2: 27 November 1966; Unit 3: 27 May 1967; Unit 4: 8 July 1967; Unit 5: 13 August 1974; Unit 6:19 December 1974; Unit 7: 10 March 1977; Unit 8: 10 January 1978; Unit 9: 27 March 1997; Unit 10: 28 February 1998; Unit 11: 26 June 2011; Unit 12: 19 May 2018
- Construction cost: 5700 crores
- Operator: Telangana Power Generation Corporation (TGGENCO)

Thermal power station
- Primary fuel: Coal

Power generation
- Units operational: 2 X 250 MW; 1 X 500 MW; 1 X 800 MW
- Nameplate capacity: 1,800 MW

External links
- Commons: Related media on Commons

Kothagudem Thermal Power Station is located at Palwancha in Telangana, India. The power plant has an installed capacity of 1,800 MW with 4 units in operation. It is one of the coal based power plants of Telangana Power Generation Corporation (TGGENCO)

| Stage | Unit Number | Installed Capacity (MW) | Date of Commissioning | Status |
|---|---|---|---|---|
| Stage I | 1 | 60 | 04-07-1966 | Shut down permanently |
| Stage I | 2 | 60 | 27-11-1966 | Shut down permanently |
| Stage II | 3 | 60 | 27-05-1967 | shut down permanently |
| Stage II | 4 | 60 | 08-07-1967 | Shut down permanently |
| Stage III | 5 | 120 | 13-08-1974 | Shut down permanently |
| Stage III | 6 | 120 | 19-12-1974 | Shut down permanently |
| Stage IV | 7 | 120 | 10-03-1977 | Shut down permanently |
| Stage IV | 8 | 120 | 10-01-1978 | Shut down permanently |
| Stage V | 9 | 250 | 27-03-1997 | Running |
| Stage V | 10 | 250 | 28-02-1998 | Running |
| Stage VI | 11 | 500 | 26-06-2011 | Running |
| Stage VII | 12 | 800 | 19-05-2018 | Running. |

In January 2012, it was reported that the Andhra Pradesh government has decided to build additional unit with capacity of 800 MW.
