= Manuguru =

- Town
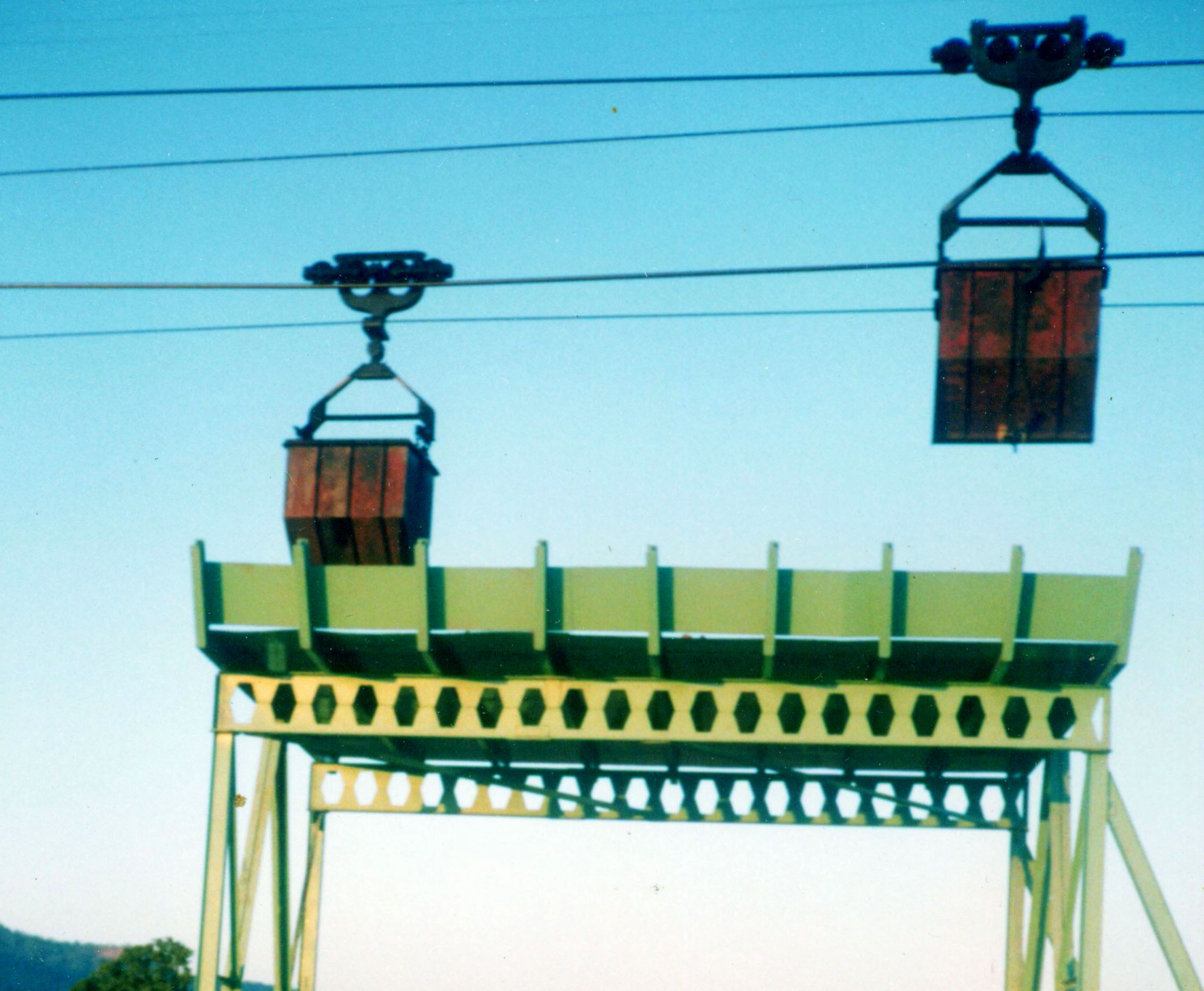
- Coal Handling Ropeway (supply of coal from Manugur open cast mine to Aswapuram Heavy Water Plant (it also has a colony))

- Location in Telangana, India Manuguru (India)
- Coordinates: 17.937255°N 80.81852°E
- Country: India
- State: Telangana
- District: Bhadradri Kothagudem district

Population (2011)
  - Total: 32,091

Languages
  - Official: Telugu
- Time zone: UTC+5:30 (IST)
- PIN: 507117
- Vehicle registration: TS-28
- Website: telangana.gov.in

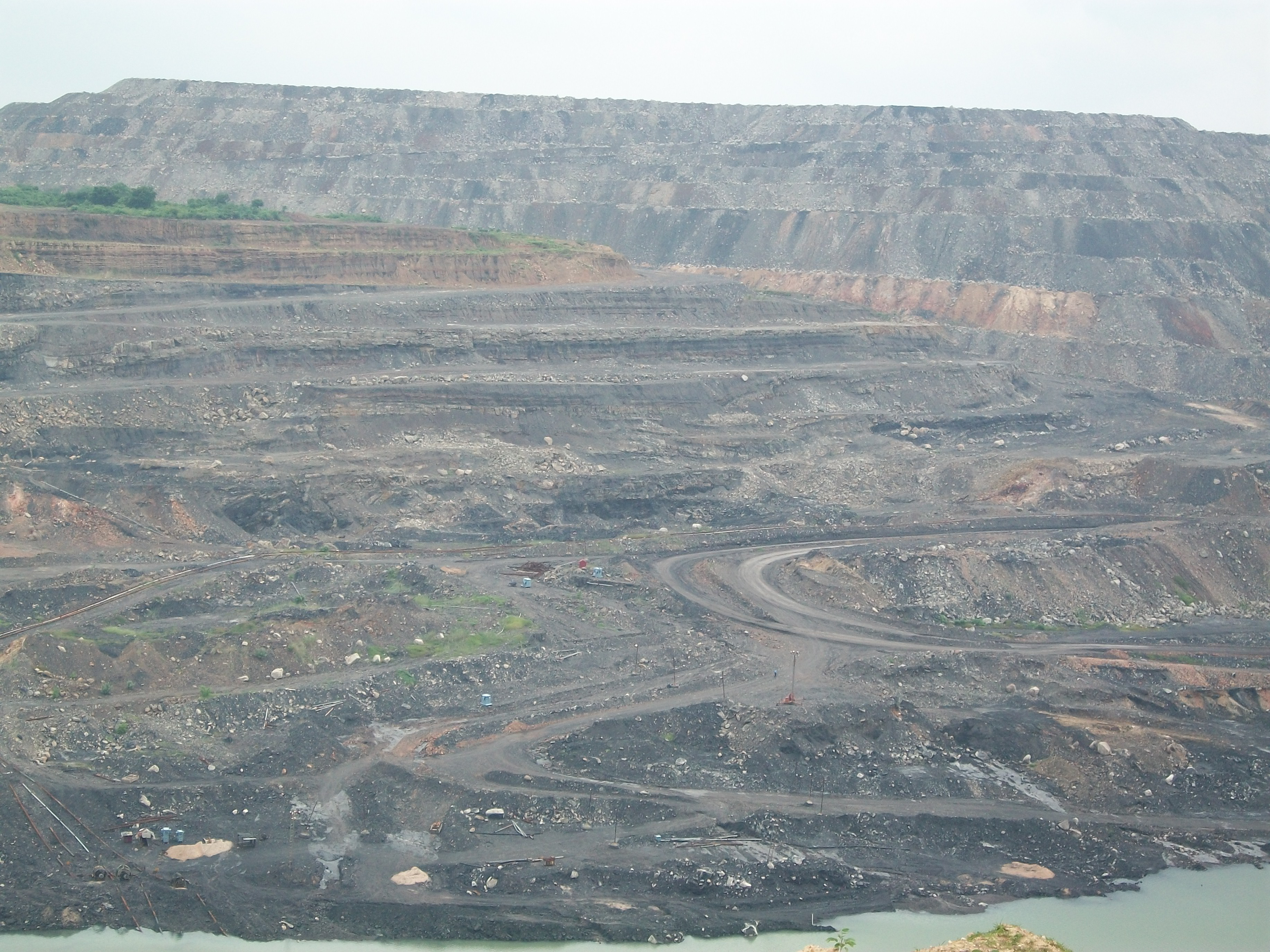
Singareni opencast coal mines at Manuguru

Manuguru is a census town and mandal in Bhadradri Kothagudem district in the Indian state of Telangana. It falls under the Mahaboobabad Parliamentary constituency and the Pinapaka Assembly constituency. Manuguru is an urban area situated on the banks of the Godavari River. The town has the Singareni coal mines, that provide many jobs, and a power plant.

A heavy water plant is located 12 km from Manuguru. Its output is used in the Nuclei district.

== Demographics ==
As of 2011 India census, Manuguru Municipality had a population of 32,091 and Manuguru Mandal had 72,117. Males constituted 49.7% of the population and females 50.3%. It had an average literacy rate of 65.9%, lower than the national average of 74.04%: male literacy of 71.9% and female literacy of 59.9%. In Manuguru, 9.5% of the population is under 6 years of age.

== Singareni Collieries ==
Hyderabad (Deccan) Company Limited, incorporated in England, acquired mining rights in 1886 to exploit coal found in Yellandu area. The present company was incorporated on 23 December 1920 under the Hyderabad Companies Act as a public limited company with the name Singareni Collieries Company (The Singareni Collieries Company Limited)). It acquired all the assets and liabilities of the Hyderabad (Deccan) Co. Ltd. Best & Co. acted as Secretaries and Selling Agents. The State of Hyderabad purchased majority shares of the Company in 1945. From 1945 to 1949, the Hyderabad Construction Co. Ltd. was acting as Managing Agent. In 1949 this function was moved to the Industrial Trust Fund by the Government of Hyderabad. Controlling interest devolved on the Government of Andhra Pradesh in 1956 pursuant to the reorganization of States.

== Nearest cities ==
- Kothagudem – 58 km
- Warangal – 174 km
- Khammam – 133 km
- Suryapet – 196 km
- Hyderabad – 330 km
- Vijayawada - 206 km
