= Bhadradri Kothagudem district =

- District
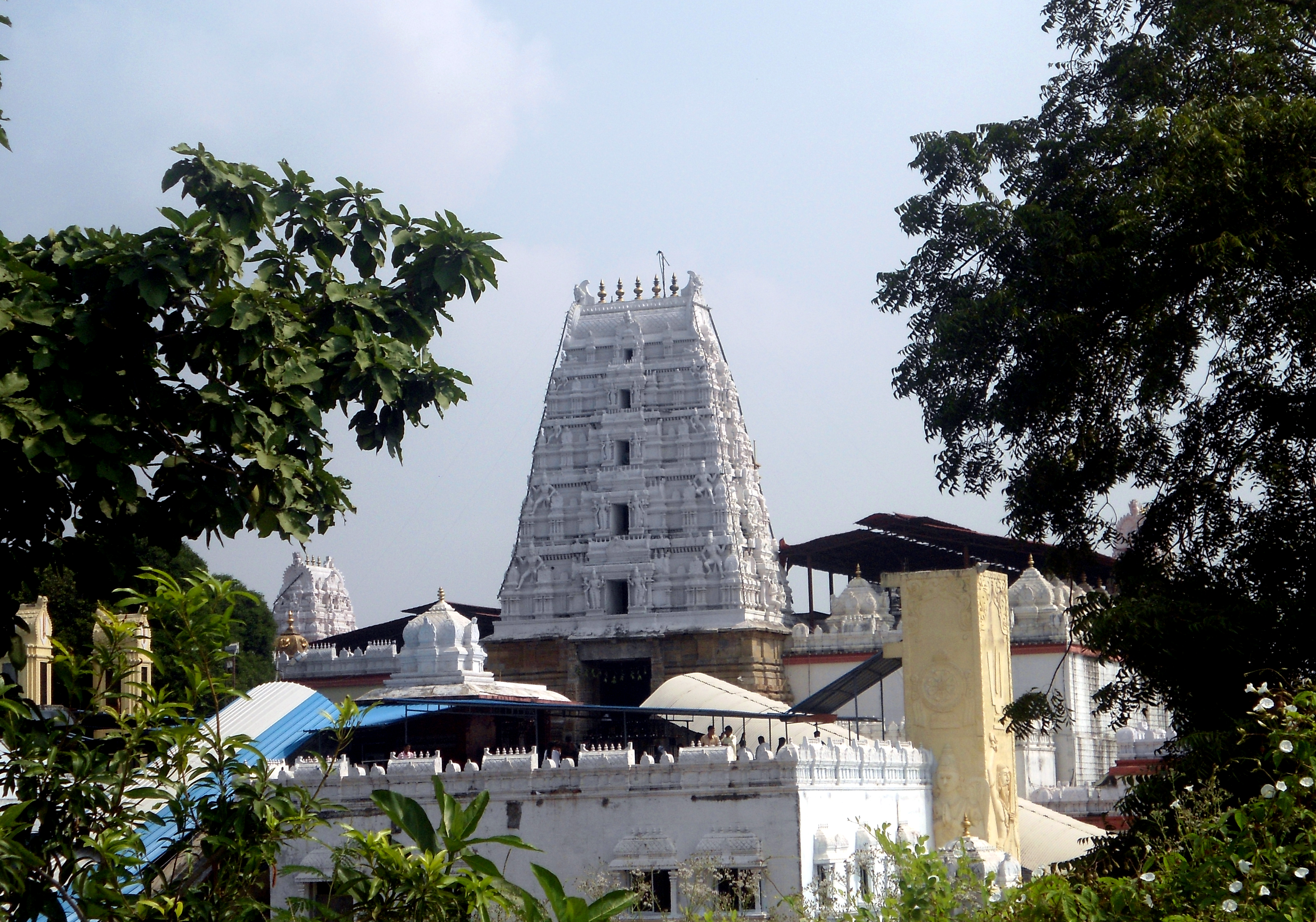
- View of Bhadrachalam Gopuram

- Location in Telangana
- Coordinates (Kothagudem): 17°39′N 80°41′E
- Country: India
- State: Telangana
- Headquarters: Kothagudem
- Mandalas: 24

Government
  - District collector: Ankit IAS
  - SP: Sri Biruduraju Rohit Raju

Area
  - Total: 7,483 km^{2} (2,889 sq mi)

Population (2011)
  - Total: 1,069,261
  - Density: 142.9/km^{2} (370.1/sq mi)
  - Urban: 31.71%
- Time zone: UTC+05:30 (IST)
- Vehicle registration: TG–28
- tg: vd
- je: xh
- Website: kothagudem.telangana.gov.in

Bhadradri Kothagudem district is a district in the east of the Indian state of Telangana. Kothagudem is the district headquarters. It is the largest district in Telangana, with an area of 7483 km^{2}. It borders the districts Khammam, Mahabubabad, Mulugu and shares a boundary with the bordering states Chhattisgarh and Andhra Pradesh. The district comprises 24 mandals and 2 revenue divisions, Kothagudem and Bhadrachalam, and 481 gram panchayats, and 5 municipalities.

Kothagudem district contains some major industries, and is endowed with a variety of important minerals such as coal. The Singareni Collieries Company (SCCL), a government coal mining company jointly owned by the Government of Telangana and Government of India, has its headquarters in Kothagudem. SCCL operates 16 opencast and 30 underground mines in four districts of Telangana with a manpower of around 58,837.

Kothagudem Thermal Power Station, which is located in Palvancha, is one of the coal-based power plants of Telangana State Power Generation Corporation Limited. The Paperboards and Specialty Papers Division of ITC Limited (ITC-PSPD) is located at Sarapaka village near Bhadrachalam.

== History ==
Prehistoric man probably roamed around the areas of lower Godavari valley in the surroundings of Bhadrachalam, Kothagudem, Pinapaka and Paloncha Taluks in the district.

Megalithic Dolmens were found at Janampet of Pinapaka Taluk. and Padugonigudem villages in Gundala Taluk of the district were rich in Megalithic cultural remnants explored and discovered recently.

Buddhist sites in the district are found at Aswaraopeta and Karukonda near Kothagudem.

Bhadrachalam town has a documented history of a Rama Temple constructed around 17th century CE by Kancherla Gopanna. popularly known as Bhakta Ramadasu or Bhadrachala Ramadasu is a saint-poet.

== Geography ==
Bhadradri Kothagudem is the easternmost district of Telangana and is spread over an area of 7,483 km^{2} (2,889 sq mi). The district is bounded on the north and northeast by the Bijapur and Sukma districts of Chhattisgarh, on the east by Polavaram district of Andhra Pradesh, on the south and southeast by the Khammam and on southeast by Eluru of Andhra Pradesh , on the west by Mahabubabad district and on the northwest by Mulugu district.

The district contains Kinnerasani Wildlife Sanctuary and also rich in forest reserves.

== Demographics ==
Religion in Bhadradri Kothagudem district (2011)
Hinduism	92.15%
Islam	5.80%
Christianity	1.60%
Other or not stated	0.45%

As of the 2011 census of India, the district has a population of 1,069,261. Bhadradri Kothagudem has a sex ratio of 1008 females per 1000 males and a literacy rate of 66.40%. 107,326 (10.04%) were under 6 years of age. 339,083 (31.71%) lived in urban areas. Scheduled Castes and Scheduled Tribes made up 143,482 (13.42%) and 392,034 (36.66%) of the population respectively.

Languages of Bhadradri Kothagudem district (2011)
1. Telugu (72.3%)
2. Koya (10.6%)
3. Lambadi (10.2%)
4. Urdu (5.09%)
5. Hindi (1.13%)
6. Others (0.74%)

At the time of the 2011 census, 72.34% of the population spoke Telugu, 10.55% Koya, 10.15% Lambadi, 5.09% Urdu and 1.13% Hindi as their first language.

== Administrative divisions ==
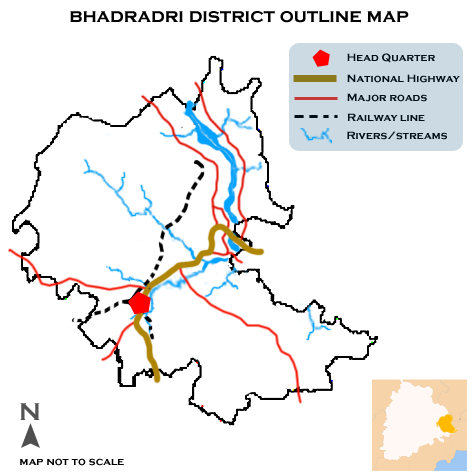
Bhadradri Kothagudem district outline map

The district has two revenue divisions of Bhadrachalam and Kothagudem and is sub-divided into 23 mandals. Ankit is the present collector of the district, having assumed the role in 2026.

=== Constituencies ===
The district contains five Telangana Legislative Assembly constituencies. Kothagudem Assembly constituency includes the towns of Kothagudem and Palvancha, part of the Khammam Lok Sabha constituency. Aswaraopeta Assembly constituency is a Scheduled Tribe (ST) reserved constituency, and is also part of the Khammam Lok Sabha constituency. The Bhadrachalam, Yellandu, and Pinapaka Assembly constituencies are ST reserved constituencies, and are part of the Mahabubabad Lok Sabha constituency.

=== Mandals ===
The below table categorizes mandals into their respective revenue divisions in the district:

No.	Mandal	Number of villages	Revenue division
1	Bhadrachalam	0	Bhadrachalam
2	Manuguru	14	Bhadrachalam
3	Aswapuram	24	Bhadrachalam
4	Pinapaka	23	Bhadrachalam
5	Burgampahad	17	Bhadrachalam
6	Cherla	26	Bhadrachalam
7	Dummugudem	37	Bhadrachalam
8	Karakagudem	16	Bhadrachalam
9	Kothagudem	0	Kothagudem
10	Allapalli	12	Kothagudem
11	Annapureddypalli	10	Kothagudem
12	Aswaraopeta	30	Kothagudem
13	Mulakalapally	20	Kothagudem
14	Palvancha	36	Kothagudem
15	Sujatanagar	20	Kothagudem
16	Tekulapalli	36	Kothagudem
17	Chandrugonda	14	Kothagudem
18	Yellandu	29	Kothagudem
19	Chunchupalli	18	Kothagudem
20	Dammapeta	31	Kothagudem
21	Gundala	11	Kothagudem
22	Julurpad	24	Kothagudem
23	Laxmidevipalli	31	Kothagudem

== See also ==
- List of districts in Telangana
