= Kothagudem =

Kothagudem Coal city of south india
- City
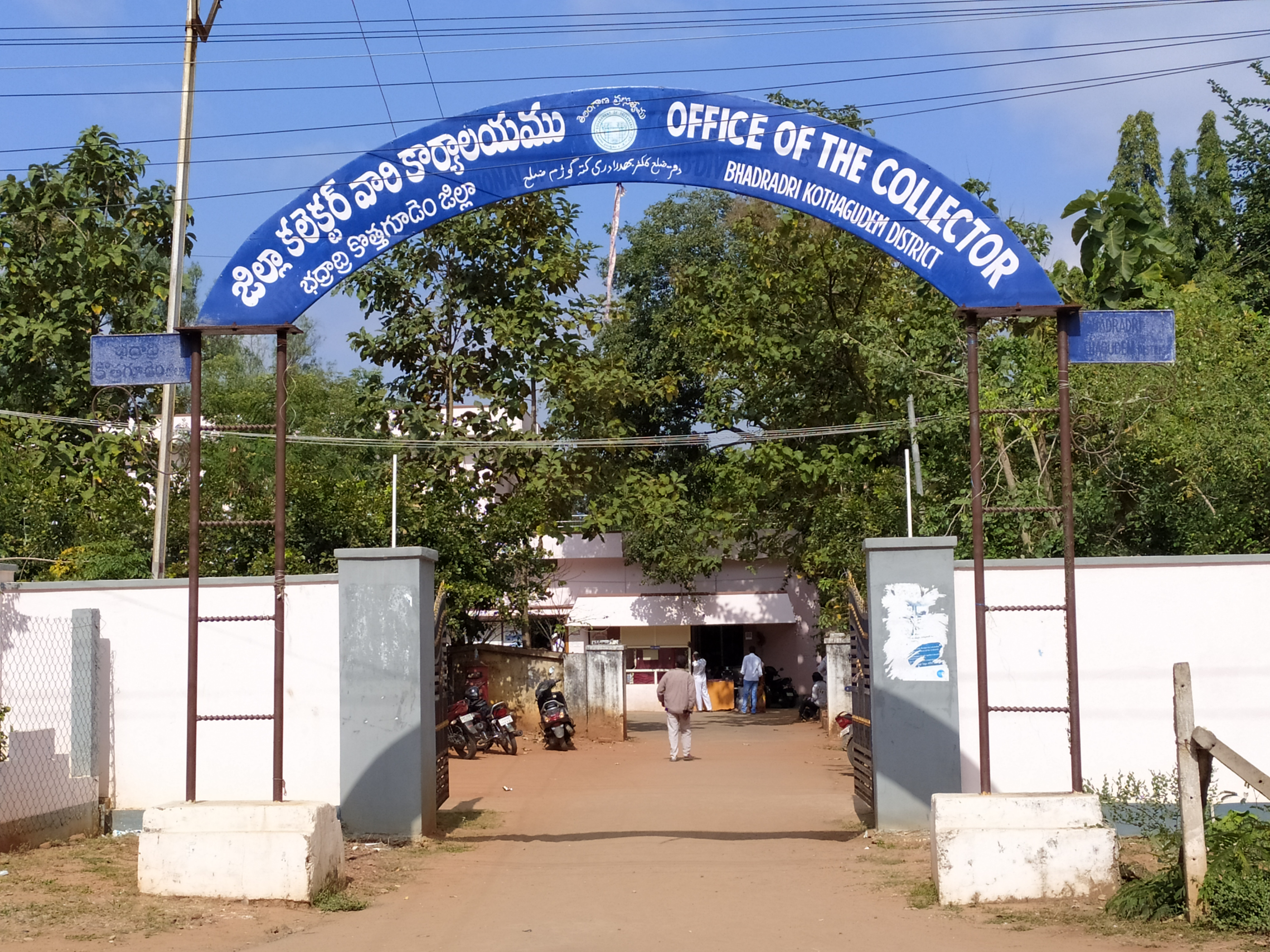
- District collectorate at Kothagudem
- Nickname: Coal city
- Location in Telangana, India Kothagudem (India)
- Coordinates: 17.550°N 80.63°E
- Country: India
- State: Telangana
- District: Bhadradri Kothagudem

Government
  - Type: Municipal corporation
  - Body: Kothagudem Municipal Corporation
  - Member of Legislative Assembly: Kunamneni Sambasiva Rao

Area
  - Total: 86.10 km^{2} (33.24 sq mi)
- Elevation: 89 m (292 ft)

Population (2025)
  - Total: 289,456
  - Rank: 6th in Telangana
  - Density: 3,362/km^{2} (8,707/sq mi)

Languages
  - Official: Telugu, Urdu
- Time zone: UTC+5:30 (IST)
- PIN: 507 xxx
- Telephone code: +91-8744
- Vehicle registration: TG 28
- Sex ratio: 1:1 ♂/♀

Kothagudem is a city in the Indian state of Telangana. It serves as the headquarters of Telangana's Bhadradri Kothagudem district. It was a part of the large Zamindari estate known as Husanabad Shankaragiri or Palvancha Zamindari in the Nizam's Dominion. The estate's name was given by Captain Glasfurd. The Zamindar of Bhadrachalam was also Zamindar of Palvancha.

== Geography ==
Kothagudem is located at 17.55°N 80.618°E. It has an average elevation of 89 metres (295 ft) above sea level. The North of Kothagudem borders Chhattisgarh state which is approximately 670 km from the town.

Kothagudem is known for its record high temperatures during summer, often crossing the 48 °C (118 °F) mark.

== Government and politics ==
Kothagudem Municipality was constituted in 1971 and is classified as a first grade municipality with 33 election wards. The jurisdiction of the civic body is spread over an area of 16.10 km^{2} (6.22 mi^{2}).

== Demographics ==
Historical population
Year	Pop.	±%
1941	9,669	—
1951	50,195	+419.1%
1961	69,728	+38.9%
1971	75,542	+8.3%
1981	94,894	+25.6%
1991	102,137	+7.6%
2001	105,266	+3.1%
2011	119,501	+13.5%

According to the 2011 India Census the population of Kothagudem was 119,501.

== Transport ==
National Highway 30 passes through this town.

=== Rail ===
Kothagudem has a train station which is called Bhadrachalam Road railway station. It is located on the Dornakal–Manuguru line.

== Education ==
- University College of Engineering, Kakatiya University

== Climate ==
Climate data for Bhadrachallam (Kothagudem) 1981–2010, extremes 1952–2012
Month	Jan	Feb	Mar	Apr	May	Jun	Jul	Aug	Sep	Oct	Nov	Dec	Year
Record high °C (°F)	37.2 (99.0)	40.6 (105.1)	42.8 (109.0)	46.4 (115.5)	48.6 (119.5)	47.5 (117.5)	40.8 (105.4)	38.2 (100.8)	38.6 (101.5)	38.2 (100.8)	36.0 (96.8)	35.2 (95.4)	48.6 (119.5)
Mean daily maximum °C (°F)	30.8 (87.4)	33.8 (92.8)	37.2 (99.0)	39.3 (102.7)	40.9 (105.6)	36.8 (98.2)	32.7 (90.9)	31.6 (88.9)	32.8 (91.0)	32.6 (90.7)	31.3 (88.3)	30.3 (86.5)	34.2 (93.6)
Mean daily minimum °C (°F)	17.0 (62.6)	19.9 (67.8)	22.8 (73.0)	25.5 (77.9)	27.4 (81.3)	26.5 (79.7)	24.6 (76.3)	24.4 (75.9)	24.5 (76.1)	22.9 (73.2)	19.3 (66.7)	16.9 (62.4)	22.6 (72.7)
Record low °C (°F)	8.4 (47.1)	11.6 (52.9)	14.0 (57.2)	17.0 (62.6)	18.6 (65.5)	19.4 (66.9)	20.0 (68.0)	19.8 (67.6)	19.6 (67.3)	14.0 (57.2)	10.0 (50.0)	8.4 (47.1)	8.4 (47.1)
Average rainfall mm (inches)	5.8 (0.23)	6.2 (0.24)	11.2 (0.44)	31.5 (1.24)	41.2 (1.62)	116.4 (4.58)	293.7 (11.56)	292.9 (11.53)	156.6 (6.17)	82.9 (3.26)	19.4 (0.76)	3.0 (0.12)	1,060.8 (41.76)
Average rainy days	0.5	0.4	0.8	1.5	2.6	7.0	13.3	13.0	8.0	4.1	1.5	0.3	52.8
Average relative humidity (%) (at 17:30 IST)	56	47	44	42	39	56	74	77	77	74	68	63	60
Source: India Meteorological Department
