= GuduguntlaPalem =

- Location in Telangana, India
- Coordinates: 16.8222°N 79.69°E
- Country: India
- State: Telangana
- District: Suryapet

Government
  - MLA: N.Uttam Kumar Reddy

Population (2011)
  - Total: 1,721

Telugu
  - Official: Telugu
- Time zone: UTC+5:30 (IST)
- PIN: 508218
- Assembly constituency: Huzurnagar
- Climate: hot (Köppen)

GuduguntlaPalem is a village in Palakeedu mandal, Suryapet district in Telangana state, India. It is located 45 km towards South from District headquarters, Suryapet.

== Demographics and location ==
It is located 3 km from Palakeedu, 25 km from Huzurnagar and the Village is 20 km from the Miryalaguda and 12 km from Deccan cement Factory. The total population of the village is about 1721 among which 55% are males.

GuduguntlaPalem Village

== Politics ==
It is a gram panchayat headed by a Sarpanch the incumbent sarpanch is Kistipati Anji Reddy. It comes under Huzurnagar Assembly constituency which become a separate assembly constituency with the delimitation in 2009 elections. First MLA is captain N. Uttam Kumar reddy.

== Economy ==
The village depends on the Nagarjuna-Sagar left canal, and the village economy is based on rice cultivation. 90% of the economy of the village is from rice and daily wages.

== Facilities ==
Village has one Primary school and Two Anganvadi schools. A two lane blacktop road transport is available which is connecting to Nereducherla and Damarcherla via Janpahad.

== Temples ==
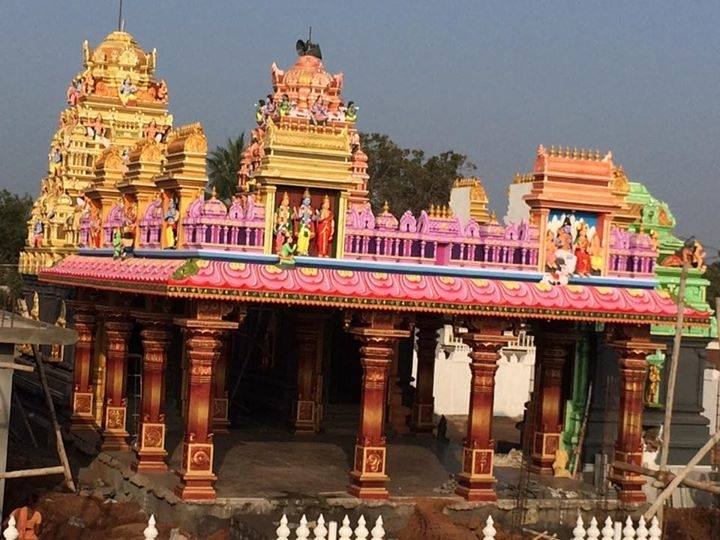
Sri ParvathiRamalingeshwara, Sri SeethaRamanjaneya and Abhayanjaneya Swamy Temple

New Temple of Sri ParvathiRamalingeshwara, Sri SeethaRamanjaneya and Abhayanjaneya Swamy Temple was opened on 28 February 2016. Devotees were participated on Idols installation and Dwajasthambam installation and neighboring villagers also participated in this event and make this successful spiritual event (Thanks to Delavalaya Committee).. Villagers contributed their support towards this temple's construction economically.

Nabhishila (Bodrai) installation happened on 10 June 2006.

Temples in the village include Anjaneyaswami temple, Kanakadurga, Thirupathamma, church and a Mosque.

Every year villagers celebrate the Sita Rama Kalyanam on Rama Navami, Vana Bhojanalu, bonalu, Thirupathamma festival, Shivarathri and Ayyappa devotees perform 40 days puja.
