= Yallapuram =

- Location in Telangana, India
- Coordinates: 16.8222°N 79.69°E
- Country: India
- State: Telangana
- District: Suryapet

Government
  - MLA: N.Uttam Kumar Reddy

Population (2011)
  - Total: 1,509

Telugu
  - Official: Telugu
- Time zone: UTC+5:30 (IST)
- PIN: 508218
- Assembly constituency: Huzurnagar
- Climate: hot (Köppen)

Yallapuram or Yellapuram is a village in Palakeedu mandal, Suryapet district in Telangana state, India. It is located 51 km south of the district's capital, Suryapet.

== Demographics and Location ==
It is located 4 km from Mandal headquarters Palakeedu, 27 km from Huzurnagar and 14 km from Deccan cement Factory. The total population of the village is about 1509 among which 55% are males.

== Politics ==
It is a gram panchayat headed by a Sarpanch. It comes under Huzurnagar Assembly constituency which become a separate assembly constituency with the delimitation in 2009 elections. First MLA is captain N. Uttam Kumar reddy.

== Economy ==
The village depends on the Nagarjuna-Sagar left canal, and the village economy is based on rice cultivation. 90% of the economy of the village is from rice and daily wages.
