= Damarcherla mandal =

Damarcherla
- Mandal
- Location in Telangana, India Damarcherla (India)
- Coordinates: 16°43′37″N 79°38′13″E
- Country: India
- State: Telangana
- District: Nalgonda

Languages
  - Official: Telugu
- Time zone: UTC+5:30 (IST)
- Area code: 508355
- Vehicle registration: TG
- Climate: hot (Köppen)
- Website: telangana.gov.in

Damarcherla, alternatively spelled Damaracherla or Damercherla, is a mandal in Nalgonda district in the state of Telangana in southern India. Damercherla is considered the head city of the mandal.

== Geography ==
Damarcherla has a total area of 4,649 hectares. The postal head office is Wadapally.

Damarcherla sits on the border of the districts of Nalgonda in Telangana and Palnadu in Andhra Pradesh. Damarcherla is surrounded by the mandals of Miryalaguda and Nereducherla towards the north, and the Andhra Pradesh mandals of Dachepalle and Gurazala to the south.

=== Nearby cities ===
- Miryalaguda – 17 km
- Macherla – 39 km
- Suryapet – 50 km
- Kodad – 52 km
- Nalgonda (district headquarters in Nalgonda) – 67 km
- Hyderabad (capital city of Telangana) – 143 km

=== Nearby villages ===
- Thalla Veerappa Gudem – 6 km
- Narsapur – 6 km
- Kondrapole – 8 km
- Bette Thanda – 8 km
- Balaji Nagarthanda – 9 km

== Population ==
The local language is Telugu.

The total population of the mandal is 66,946 people who live in 13,377 houses, spread across a total of 90 villages and 24 panchayats. There are approximately 34,519 men and 32,427 women living in the mandal.

Administrative Division	Village	Population
Damarcherla	Adavi Devula Palle	7,556
Damarcherla	Baleenpalle	1,637
Damarcherla	Chityala	1,403
Damarcherla	Damercherla	12,710
Damarcherla	Dilawarpur	5,314
Damarcherla	Irkigudem	1,446
Damarcherla	Kalle Palle	2,150
Damarcherla	Kesawapur	4,543
Damarcherla	Kondrapolu	5,115
Damarcherla	Mudimanikam	1,345
Damarcherla	Mulkacharla	3,753
Damarcherla	Narsapur	1,643
Damarcherla	Thalla Veerappa Gudem	2,372
Damarcherla	Timmapur	2,076
Damarcherla	Ulshayapalem	1,555
Damarcherla	Vadapalle	8,108
Damarcherla	Veerla Palem	4,220

== Landmarks ==
=== Temples ===
- Mutylamma Temple
- Kanaka Durga Temple
- Kanyaka Parameswari Temple
- Sri Lakshmi Narasimha Swamy Temple – Wazirabad, 5.7 km from Damarcherla
- Krishna Musi River Samgamam – Vadapally, 6.3 km from Damarcherla

=== Schools and colleges ===
- Raasi DAV High School – Vadapally, Telangana
- Nobel Concept School
- Shantiniketan E/M High School
- Prathibha Vidyalayam High school
- Kgbv Dameracharla
- Nagarjuna High School
- Sri Vidyanikethan High Sc
- Sri Krishna Junior College
- Aptwrs Jr College For Girls

== Infrastructure ==
=== Transport ===
There are many railway stations located in the surrounding region. The Guntur Junction Railway Station is the divisional railway station. There are also railway stations in Vishnupuram and Miryalaguda. The Halt Railway station is in Kondrapole.

Telangana State Road Transport Corporation (TSRTC) and Andhra Pradesh State Road Transport Corporation (APSRTC) operate buses in the region.

Airports near Damarcharla include:

- Vijayawada Airport – 140 km
- Rajiv Gandhi International Airport – 157 km
- Rajahmundry Airport – 264 km
- Tirupati Airport – 385 km

=== Yadadri Power Plant ===
Yadadri Thermal Power Plant is a project near Veerlapalem village in the mandal. Telangana State Power Generation Corporation Limited (TSGENCO) awarded the contract to build the facility to Bharat Heavy Electricals Limited.

The scope of the contract included the design, supply, erection and commissioning of the Yadadri 5 x 800 MW Thermal Power Station. Project completion was proposed to be achieved within 48 months from its start date of June 2015.

=== Proposed dry port ===
The government proposed spending ₹2,700 crore (US$280 million) to set up four dry ports around Hyderabad. Sources in infrastructure and investment said that the dry ports were proposed at Damarcherla along the Miryalaguda–Wadapally highway (3,000 acres), Bhongir along NH-163 (450 acres), Jadcherla along NH-7 (319 acres), and Zaheerabad along NH-9 (825 acres).
