= Sri Rangapuram =

- hamlet
- Location in Telangana, India Sri Rangapuram (India)
- Coordinates: 17°5′36″N 79°54′18″E
- Country: India
- State: Telangana
- District: Suryapet district
- mandal: Nadigudem

Languages
  - Official: Telugu
- Time zone: UTC+5:30 (IST)
- PIN: 508234
- Telephone code: 8683
- Vehicle registration: TS

Sri Rangapuram is a village in Nadigudem mandal, Suryapet district of Telangana. It is located 18.8 kilometres (11.7 mi) from Kodad town.

== Economy ==
The village is dependent on cultivation. The Nagarjuna Sagar Dam canal is the main source of water for the population.

== Demographics ==
There are around 500 families living in this village. Most of the families hold less than 1.5 hectares of land. The village has a mix of Kshatriya Raju caste, Kamma, Vysya, Telaga, Dudekula, Gowda, Yadava, Viswakarma, and Madiga communities. The Madiga community constitutes the majority of the population.

== Education ==
The village has a primary school with four classrooms.
