= Motumarri–Vishnupuram section =

Railway line in India

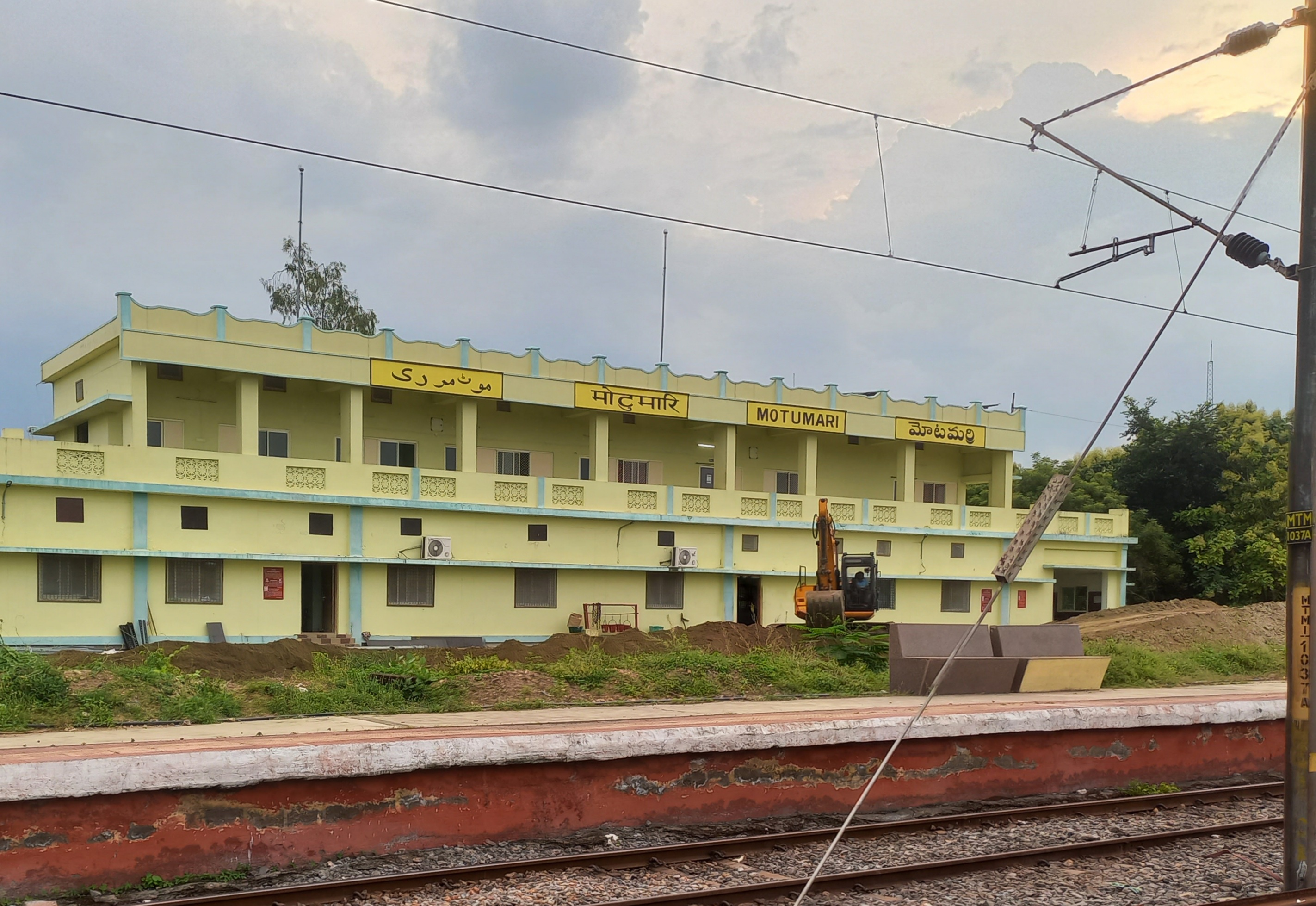
- Motumarri Railway station is an end point of this section

Overview
- Status: Operational
- Owner: Indian Railways
- Locale: Telangana
- Termini: Motamarri; Vishnupuram
- Stations: 10

Service
- System: Single Electric Railway Line
- Services: Delhi–Chennai line Pagidipalli–Nallapadu section
- Operator: South Central Railway zone

History
- Opened: 2019

Technical
- Line length: 89 km (55 mi)
- Number of tracks: 1
- Track gauge: 5 ft 6 in (1,676 mm) broad gauge
- Electrification: Single-line overhead catenary
- Operating speed: 75 km/h (47 mph)

The Motumarri–Vishnupuram section is a railway section of the Indian Railways. The section falls under the administration of Secunderabad railway division of South Central Railway zone.

== History ==
The project connects Delhi–Chennai main line at Motumarri railway station of Khammam district and Nallapadu-Pagidipalli section at Vishnupuram railway station of Nalgonda district in the Indian state of Telangana. The section passes through the stations of Jaggayyapet, Mellacheruvu and Janpahad. The route has been opened for goods traffic at present.

Further, the route can be used as a loop line in case of emergency and any problem that arises between Khammam and Secunderabad line.

Another key factor of the Motamarri–Vishnupuram line is the distance between Vijayawada to Secunderabad will be reduced by 60 km if some passenger trains ply this route.

The journey duration between the two cities will be reduced to one-and-a-half hours. Some passenger trains running from Kolkata and Visakhapatnam can be diverted to this route.

The section was completed in the year 2019.

== Stations ==
- Motumarri (MTMI)
- Makkapeta (MAPA)
- Jaggyyapetta Town (JPTN)
- Revoor Ramapuram (RRPM)
- Mellacheruvu(MACU)
- Mattampalle (MTMP)
- Janpahad (JNPD)
- Vishnupuram (VNUP)
