= Chilkur, Suryapet district =

Chilkur
- Census town
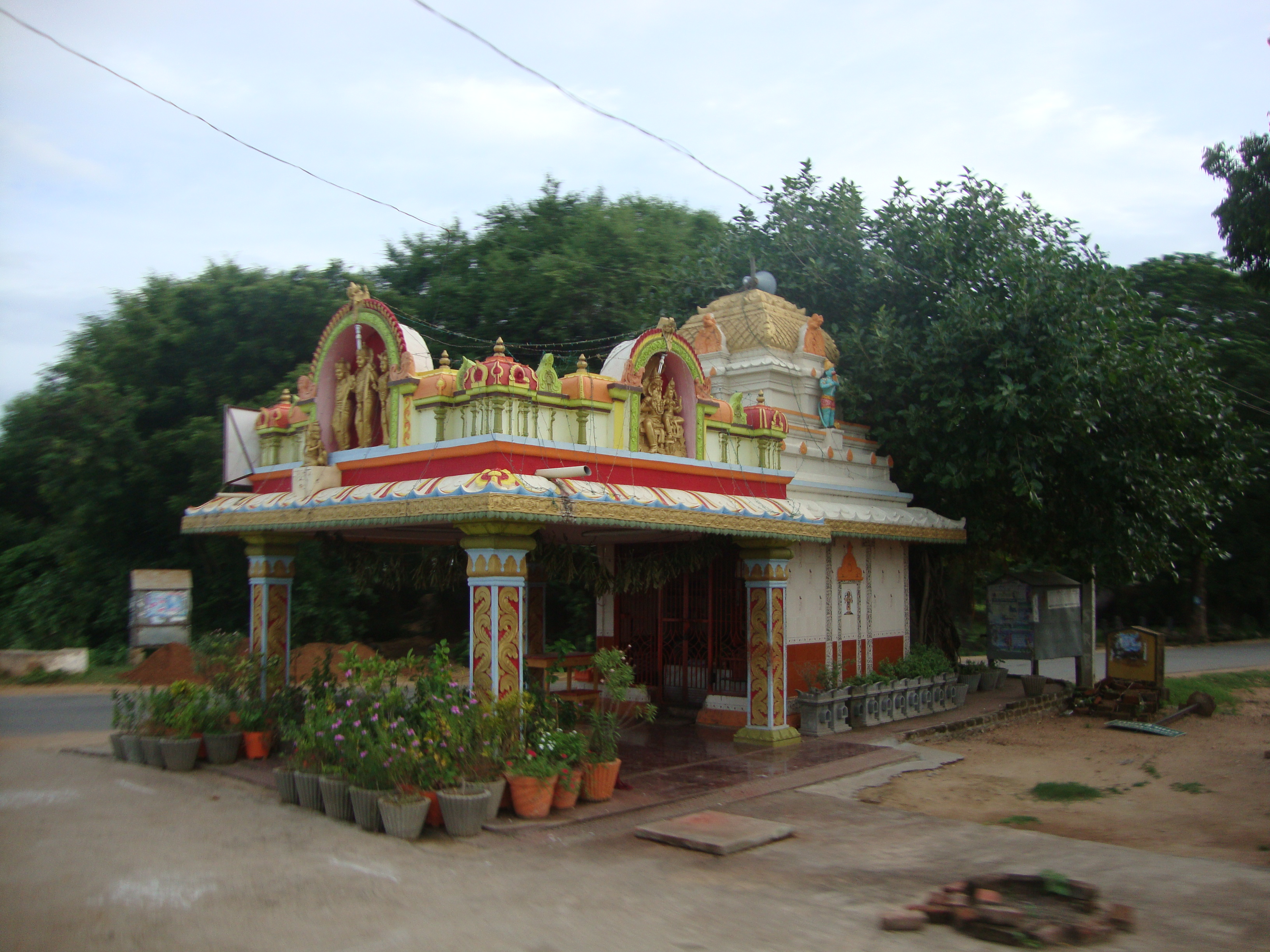
- Kotta Chilkur Anjaneya Temple
- Nickname: Chilukur
- Location in Telangana, India Chilkur (India)
- Coordinates: 16°57′40″N 79°54′45″E
- Country: India
- State: Telangana
- District: Suryapet

Government
  - Type: Gram Panchayat
  - Body: Chilkur Gram Panchayat
  - Sarpanch: Puttapaka Srinu (Communist Party of India)
  - MLA: B. Mallaiah yadhav

Population (2011)
  - Total: 18,952

Languages
  - Official: Telugu
- Time zone: UTC+5:30 (IST)
- PIN: 508206
- Vehicle registration: TS-29
- Lok Sabha constituency: Nalgonda
- Vidhan Sabha constituency: Kodad
- Website: https://manachilkur.blogspot.in/

Chilkur (Chilkuru) is a census town in Suryapet district of the Indian state of Telangana. It is 50 km away from district headquarters Suryapet and lies between Kodad and Huzurnagar. It is the headquarters of Chilkur mandal of Kodad revenue division.

== Climate ==
It is hot in summer. Chilkur summer highest day temperature is between 35 °C to 48 °C. Average temperature of January is 24 °C, February is 26 °C, March is 29 °C, April is 33 °C, May is 36 °C.

== Demographics ==
According to Census of India, 2011, population of Chilkur is 18,952 of which 9,578 are male and 9,374 are female. The literacy rate is 85.7%. Sex ratio is 986 females to 1000 males. Child sex ratio is 951 girls to 1000 boys.

== Governance ==
=== Politics ===
Chilkur falls under Kodad (Assembly constituency) of Telangana Legislative Assembly. Sri. Bollam Mallaiah Yadav is the present MLA of the constituency from BRS.

== History ==
Chalukyas, Kakatiyas and Nizam dynasties ruled the region.
