= Yogananda Lakshmi Narasimha Swamy Temple =

Hindu temple in Telangana, India

Yogananda Lakshmi Narasimha Temple
- Location in Telangana

Religion
- Affiliation: Hinduism
- District: Suryapet
- Deity: Yogananda Lakshmi Narasimha (Narasimha); Rajalakshmi Thayar; Chenchu Lakshmi (tribal form of Lakshmi)
- Features: Tower: Brahma Ananda Vimanam; Temple tank: Krishnaveni Theertham

Location
- Location: Mattampally
- State: Telangana
- Country: India
- Interactive map of Yogananda Lakshmi Narasimha Temple
- Coordinates: 16.72°N 79.82°E

Architecture
- Type: Dravidian architecture

The Yogananda Lakshmi Narasimha Swamy Temple, also known as Mattapalli Narasimha Temple, is a Hindu temple dedicated to Narasimha, the half-man half-lion avatar of Vishnu, and his consort Lakshmi. It is located in Mattampally (also known as Mattapalli), a village in the Mattampally mandal of Suryapet district in the Indian state of Telangana. One of the Pancha Narasimha Kshetras, the temple is located on the banks of the Krishna River, and was built in the 11th century by Anumala Machi Reddy, the king of Thangedu region after the deity appeared in his dream and instructed him to do so. The main shrine houses a swayambhu (self-manifested) idol of Narasimha as Yogananda Lakshmi Narasimha, and was worshipped by sage Bharadvaja and other seers for hundreds of years before the temple was constructed. Lakshmi is worshipped here as Rajalakshmi Thayar and Chenchu Lakshmi Thayar. The temple follow vadakalai sampradayam, the anrchakas are the vaikhanasa families, there is influence from Ahobilam and its mutt here. The Chennuri family manages the temple.

Situated on the border of the Indian Telugu speaking states of Telangana and Andhra Pradesh, Mattapalli Narasimha Temple is one of the few Vaishnava temples in India which are following the Vaikhanasa agama doctrines of worship in India, after the rise of the Pancharatra tradition in the 10th–11th centuries. It is also popular for providing free food and accommodation to the devotees, serving more than 100,000 pilgrims on a daily basis, and is hence referred to as Annalayam (Temple of Rice). The temple's committee is managed by the Chennuri family for generations, and is under administrative control of the Telangana State Government's Endowments Department.

== Legend ==
Based on an inscription found in the temple in Devanagari script, the temple is estimated to be around 1100 years old.

Per the local legend, the central icon is a swayambhu (self-manifested) idol of Narasimha, the half-man half-lion avatar of Vishnu, which was worshipped primarily by the sage Bharadvaja and other seers for hundreds of years in a cave; it used to be their custom to visit the deity and seek blessings after bathing in the Krishna River, on whose banks the cave was situated.

In the 11th century, a farmer named Anumala Machi Reddy lived in the area with his family. Once he instructed his daughter-in-law Bhavanasinidevi to assist him in sowing beans in the field. As she left for the fields praying to the god Shiva, she unknowingly gave away the beans to devotees of Shiva, who begged for alms. She used the sand particles as the beans whilst praying to Shiva. The resultant crop yielded golden beans, half of which Machi Reddy donated to the poor and used the rest to build the village of Thangeda (also known as Thangedu), declaring himself as its ruler.

The cave now was a part of Thangedu; Narasimha once instructed Machi Reddy to locate the cave and construct a temple. Machi Reddy and his associates searched the forests, and were unable to find the cave. Machi Reddy then fell asleep; Narasimha again instructed him in his dream to follow the eagle perched on a bidi leaf tree before him, who will lead to the cave. Machi Reddy followed the trail of the eagle, and found the cave. Another legend states that a sage named Sri Keshava Teertha Yateendra built a hermitage there and worshipped Narasimha for around 20 years before Machi Reddy commenced the construction; until then, Mattapalli was a tough pilgrimage with people climbing the rocks using carts with fewer devotees visiting the deity.

Another legend associated with this temple is of Chennuri Giramma, one of the ancestors of Chennuri Sri Narasimha Rao, a former committee chairman of the temple. She lived during the rule of the Mughal emperor Aurangzeb, and was a staunch devotee of Narasimha. When the Mughal forces tried to attack the temple, Giramma prayed to Narasimha, who apparently sent a swarm of countless bees onto the soldiers. The attempt to seize the temple proved to be a failure, and the Mughals gave up. This story is recited at the temple as a part of its sthala purana, but there is no known historic documentation to support this legend. The temple's committee is managed by the Chennuri family for generations, and is currently managed by Chennuri Mattapalli Rao.

== Architecture ==
The temple is located in Mattampally (also known as Mattapalli), a village in the Mattampally mandal of Suryapet district in the Indian state of Telangana, and was previously a part of Nalgonda district. It is situated on the border of Telangana and Andhra Pradesh states. The gopuram (main tower) of the temple is three-tiered and faces east, leading to the main shrine and the dhwaja stambha (flagstaff). The temple's tank, which is part of the Krishna River (also known by the name Krishnaveni), is approached by the steps on the South side of the temple.

The main shrine has two natural openings on the west and the north, and two hallways were later added to house the subsidiary deities of the temple. The hallway leading to the sanctum sanctorum (which faces west), called the mukhamandapam, measures 24 feet x 45 feet and is composed of 21 pillars with a cement roof. Another similar but smaller hallway is found near the Northern entrance with only five pillars. It was built in 1973-75 with a dimension of 21 x 18 feet. The north door to the sanctum sanctorum is named Vaikuntha Dwaram (gateway to Vaikuntha, the abode of Vishnu), and features carvings of Ashta Lakshmi (Note: Ashta Lakshmi is a group of the eight manifestations of Lakshmi. She presides over eight sources of wealth: spirituality, material wealth, agriculture, royalty, knowledge, courage, progeny, and victory.) and two images of Narasimha, one seated in a yogic posture and the other killing the demon king Hiranyakashipu.

The central deity, Yogananda Lakshmi Narasimha, is one-foot tall seated in padmasana (lotus position). The idol is an amorphous rock formation which has four hands holding the Sudarshana Chakra and the Panchajanya with his upper right and left hands respectively, as the lower left hand rests on his thigh and the lower right hand is not visible. Narasimha is sheltered by the hoods of the serpent Adisesha. The deity wears a body armor made of silver and a mustache, along with plated eyes and a Urdhva Pundra which help denote the facial features clearly. To the left of the central deity, there is a decorated Urdhva Pundra and two eyes, which represent Prahlada, a staunch devotee of Narasimha. The idols of Rajalakshmi Thayar and Chenchu Lakshmi Thayar were later installed in the temple to cool down the central deity's rage. The idol of Chenchu Lakshmi Thayar is a rock sculpture shown in a sitting posture on a lotus, with a crown on her head and her upper hands holding a lotus each; her lower hands are shown in the Abhaya and the Suchi postures. The idol of Rajalakshmi Thayar is placed below the Chenchu Lakshmi Thayar (who is seated to the left of the central deity) in order to enable devotees offer their prayers to the goddess as the other idol is not made available to them. At the feet of Narasimha, there is a rock sculpture of a bird named Chakri, a devotee of the deity; Narasimha wanted Chakri to remain with him and hence the bird is worshipped along with the deity regularly. In front of the central deity, at a lower level, there are utsava (festival) idols of Narasimha and Lakshmi, as well as copper images of an anthropomorphic form of the Sudarshana Chakra and Nammalvar, one of the Alvars.

There are small shrines dedicated to Hanuman and Garuda opposite the main shrine; the former is worshipped here with the name Prasanna Anjaneya Swamy, and as the temple's kshetrapala (guardian deity). A distinct feature of the temple, that separates itself from other Hindu temples in Telangana, is the absence of a path for circumambulation around the sanctum sanctorum. Hence, the devotees choose the dhwaja stambha or the Prasanna Anjaneya Swamy shrine to complete the ritual. The north hallway contains three shrines, each dedicated to the Alvars (a group of twelve Tamil poet-saints), Vaikhanasas (Sage Vikhanasa and his disciples Atri, Bhrigu, Kashyapa and Marichi), and to Andal (the only female poet-saints among the Alvars). The temple also houses the Ramanuja Kutam or the kitchen where the Naivedya (daily food offering) is prepared. In 1992, Mukkur Lakshminarasimhachariar of Ahobilam, a staunch Narasimha devotee and vedic scholar, came to Mattapalli to perform a yagna as part of a series of similar worships across multiple Narasimha temples in India. In 1995, he established the Mattapalli Narasimha Swamy Peetham and continued to perform various yagnas here until 2000. His descendant Srinivasan started the Swathi Narasimha Mahayagna Trust and constructed a yagnavatika along with multiple guest houses.

== Religious significance ==
Mattapalli Narasimha Temple is one of the Pancha Narasimha Kshetras, (Note: Pancha Narasimha Kshetras is a group of five Hindu temples dedicated to Narasimha in the Telugu speaking regions of India. They are located at Mattampally, Vadapally, Vedadri, Mangalagiri and Kethavaram.) and is one of the few Vaishnava temples in India which are following the Vaikhanasa agama doctrines of worship in India, after the rise of the Pancharatra tradition in the 10th–11th centuries. The temple is also known for conducting annadanam in its premises on a daily basis from the 11th century as per the temple inscriptions, and the deity is hence referred to as "Annalayya" (Lord of Rice), giving the temple its another name "Annalayam" (Temple of Rice). (Note: Annadanam is a practice of distributing free food at temples in India. The practice is common in India, as the hermits and individuals provide free food to the poor and hungry on special occasions of religious importance.) Mattapalli has the second highest number of choultries after Srisailam Bhramaramba Mallikarjuna Temple in the Telugu speaking Indian states, which provide food and accommodation to the pilgrims, serving food to more than 100,000 people per day on a daily basis. The devotees who visit this temple pray to Narasimha mainly for improving their health, finding cure for life-threatening ailments and for warding away evil spirits. One of the usual rituals in the temple is devotees performing 32 pradakshinas around the dhwaja sthambha, the Prasanna Anjaneya Swamy shrine and the bidi leaf tree under which the deity was found by Machi Reddy; they perform this ritual wishing for their desires to come true, and return to perform it again once their wishes get fulfilled. The temple's legends say that Yama, the god of death in Hinduism, visited Mattapalli and performed this ritual, which gave it the name "Yama Mohita Kshetra" (Yama's beloved temple). Another notable practice in Mattapalli is the usage of bidi leaves to worship Narasimha, instead of tulasi leaves (which is an important aspect of Vishnu worship in Hinduism), as the deity was found under the same tree.

== Worship practices and festivals ==
The temple is under administrative control of the Telangana State Government's Endowments Department. The temple follows the Vaikhanasa agama doctrine of worship, and the priests belong to the Sri Vaishnavaite community, a Brahmin sub-caste.

Mattapalli is also one of the places in Telangana and Andhra Pradesh states to host the Krishna Pushkaralu, a festival that normally occurs once in every 12 years, and special bathing ghats were constructed for it in 2016. (Note: Pushkaram is a traditional 12-day Hindu festival focusing on ancestor worship. It is celebrated every 12 years at 12 Indian rivers when Brihaspati (the personification of Jupiter) enters Leo, the zodiac sign of Surya. Believers consider bathing in a river during Pushkaram auspicious.)

== Bibliography ==
- Vedagiri, Anu (2004). Five Narasimha Temples In Andhra Pradesh And Their Function As A Religious Collective. United States: Ohio State University.
- Narasimhacharya, Madabhushini (1989). History of the Cult of Narasimha in Telangana (Andhra Pradesh - from Ancient to the Modern Period). Hyderabad: Tirumala Printing Works.
