= Huzurnagar mandal =

Huzurnagar mandal హుజూర్‌నగర్ మండలం
- Mandal
- Location in Telangana, India
- Coordinates: 16.895558°N 79.872623°E
- Country: India
- State: Telangana
- District: Suryapet
- Headquarters: Huzurnagar

Population (2011)
  - Total: 57,433

Languages
  - Official: Telugu
- Time zone: UTC+5:30 (IST)
- PIN: 508204
- Vehicle registration: TS 29

Huzurnagar mandal is one of the 23 mandals in Suryapet district of the Indian state of Telangana. It is under the administration of Huzurnagar revenue division with its headquarters at Huzurnagar. It is bounded by Chilkur mandal towards North, Mellachervu mandal and Mattampally mandal towards South, Garidepally Mandal towards west, Kodad mandal towards east.

== Geography ==
It is in the 112 m elevation above sea level.

== Demographics ==
Huzurnagar mandal is having a population of 57,433 living in 13,329 Houses. Males are 29,257 and Females are 28,176. Lakkavaram is the smallest Village and Huzurnagar is the biggest town in the mandal.

== Villages and Town ==
As of 2011 census of India, the mandal has 7 settlements. The settlements in the mandal are listed below:

1. Huzurnagar (CT) †
2. Karakkayala Gudem
3. Burugadda
4. Macharam
5. Lingagiri
6. Lakkavaram
7. Amravaram
8. Yepala Singaram

Notes
(†) Mandal headquarter
