= Palakeedu mandal =

- Mandal
- Location in Telangana, India
- Coordinates: 16.8321°N 79.4356°E
- Country: India
- State: Telangana
- District: Suryapet
- Headquarters: Palakeedu

Population (2011)
  - Total: 24,356

Languages
  - Official: Telugu
- Time zone: UTC+5:30 (IST)
- PIN: 508212
- Vehicle registration: TS 29

Palakeedu mandal is one of the 23 mandals in Suryapet district of the Indian state of Telangana. It is under the administration of Huzurnagar revenue division with its headquarters at Palakeedu.It is bounded by Neredcherla mandal towards north, Mattampally mandal towards east, Nalgonda district towards west and Krishna River towards south.

== Demographics ==
Palakeedu mandal has a population about 24,356.

== Villages ==
It is carved out from Neredcherla mandal. The mandal has 14 settlements. The settlements in the mandal are listed below:

1. Palakeedu (CT) †
2. Nagireddygudem
3. Hanmayagudem
4. Bettegudem
5. Janpahad
6. Guduguntlapalem
7. Bothalapalem
8. Musivoddu Singaram
9. Yellapuram
10. Sajjapuram
11. Komatikunta
12. Shunyapahad
13. Mahankaligudem
14. Ravipahad
15. Gundeboinagudem
16. Alingapuram
17. Gundlapahad

Notes
(†) Mandal headquarter
