= Bothalapalem =

- Village
- Location in Telangana, India
- Coordinates: 16.8321°N 79.4356°E
- Country: India
- State: Telangana
- District: Suryapet
- Mandal: Palakaveedu

Government
  - Sarpanch: Bogala
  - MLA: Shanampudi Saidi Reddy

Population
  - Total: 2,074

Language
  - Official: Telugu
- Time zone: UTC+5:30 (IST)
- PIN: 508218
- Nearest city: Suryapet
- Assembly constituency: Huzurnagar
- Climate: Hot (Köppen)
- Website: suryapet.telangana.gov.in

Bothalapalem is a village in Palakeedu mandal, Suryapet district in Telangana state, India. It is located 50 km from the district headquarters, Suryapet. The total population of the village is about 2,074, of which 55% are males.

== Geography ==
Bothalapalem is located at 16.8321°N 79.4356°E. It has an average elevation of 245 metres (791 ft).

== Education ==
In Bothalapalem, there are a primary school, and high school (Zilla Parishad High School), established in 2006. This co-ed school is affiliated with Telangana Board of Secondary Education (BSETS). Zilla Parishad High School (ZPHS), Bothalapalem is a higher secondary. It is owned and operated by the local body.

== Politics ==
Bothalapalem comes under Huzurnagar Assembly constituency which become a separate assembly constituency with the delimitation in 2009 elections. First MLA is captain N. Uttam Kumar reddy. It is politically active village. People are politically active and support political parties with due diligence.

In the 2019 Bothalapalem Sarpanch elections, the TRS Party Supporters (Bogala Veera Reddy) formed an alliance with CPM (Anantha Prakash Kandagatla) supporters in the village. The Indian National Congress Party supporter (Pinnelli Upender Rao) contested alone, and Bharatiya Janata Party supporters also contested. The election resulted in a majority vote for Bogala Veera Reddy.

== Houses of worship ==
Houses of worship in the village include:

- Anjaneyaswami Temple
- Ganga Temple
- A Christian church
- Ramalayam Mosque (Majid E Hussaini)
- A temple of Veera Brahmam Ganga is under construction.

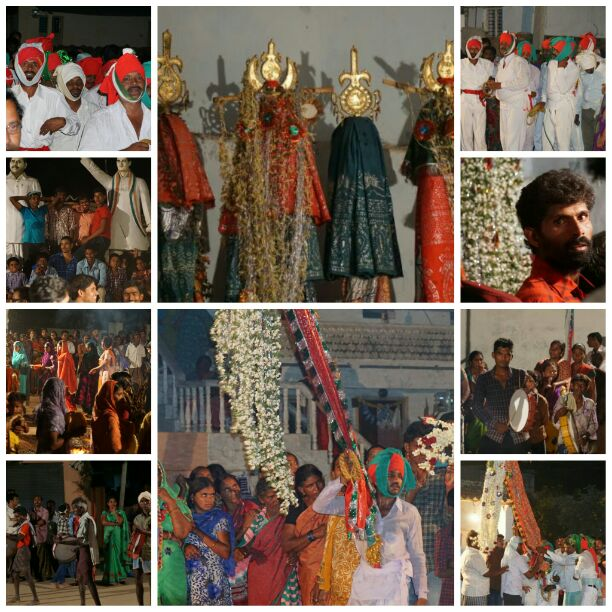
Moharram Festival in Bothalapalem

== Economy ==
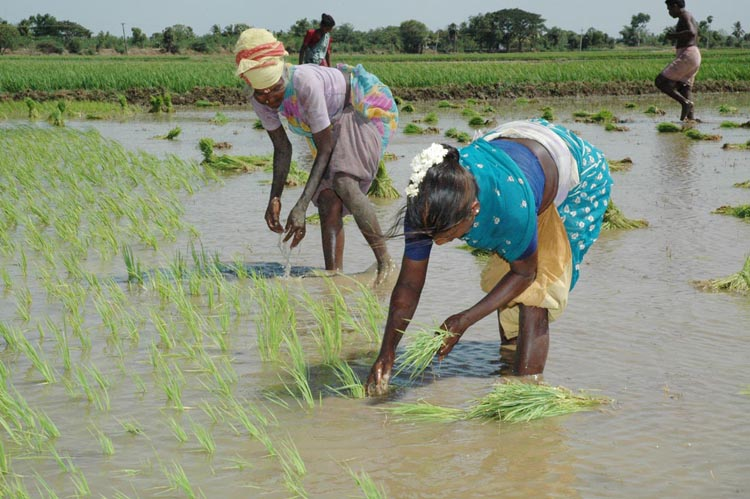
Agriculture field at Bothalapalem

The village depends on the Nagarjuna Sagar left canal, and the village economy is based on rice cultivation. 90% of the economy of the village is from rice and daily wages and other sources like Pond but now those were not generating economy for village.

== Transport ==
- Bothalapalem village is well-connected by bus transport.
- There is an hourly bus route from Bothalapalem to Neredcherla
- Morning bus services are available to Hyderabad daily.
- Telugu-Velugu bus services are available to nearby villages.
