= Nadigudem mandal =

Nadigudem mandal నడిగూడెం మండలం
- Mandal
- Location in Telangana, India
- Coordinates: 17.152601°N 79.8000°E
- Country: India
- State: Telangana
- District: Suryapet
- Headquarters: Nadigudem

Population (2011)
  - Total: 29,761

Languages
  - Official: Telugu
- Time zone: UTC+5:30 (IST)
- PIN: 508234
- Vehicle registration: TS 29

Nadigudem mandal is one of the 23 mandals in Suryapet district of the Indian state of Telangana. It is under the administration of Kodad revenue division with its headquarters at Nadigudem. It is bounded by Munagala mandal towards South, Mothey mandal towards North, Kodad mandal towards East, Chilkur mandal towards South.

== Demographics ==
Mothey mandal is having a population of 29,761 . Eklaskhan Peta is the smallest Village and Nadigudem is the biggest Village in the mandal.

== Villages ==
As of 2011 census of India, the mandal has 11 settlements. The settlements in the mandal are listed below:

1. Nadigudem (CT) †
2. Brundavanapuram
3. Eklaskhan Peta
4. Tellebelly
5. Rathnavaram
6. Vallapuram
7. Ramapuram
8. Chakirala
9. Siripuram
10. Karivirala
11. Kagitha Ramachandrapuram

Notes
(†) Mandal headquarter
