= Peddaveedu =

- Village
- Location in Peddaveedu, Suryapet, Telangana, India
- Coordinates: 16.855805°N 79.893723°E
- Country: India
- State: Telangana
- District: Suryapet

Population (2011)
  - Total: 8,084

Languages
  - Official: Telugu
- Time zone: UTC+5:30 (IST)
- PIN: 508204
- Vehicle registration: TS-29

Peddaveedu is a village in Mattampally mandal of Suryapet district in Telangana, India. It is located 73 km from district headquarters, Suryapet.

== Geography ==
It is in the 75 m (246 ft) elevation (altitude).

== Demographics ==
Peddaveedu is the most populated village in Mattampally mandal . It has population of 8084 of which 4069 are males while 4015 are females as per Population Census 2011. The literacy rate of village was 50.61% where Male literacy stands at 62.01% while female literacy rate was 39.17%.

== Politics ==
It falls under Huzurnagar Assembly constituency and the village is administrated by Sarpanch, who is elected representative of village.
