= Kodad Assembly constituency =

Constituency of the Telangana legislative assembly in India

Coordinates: 17.00°N 79.96°E

Kodad
- Constituency No. 90 for the Telangana Legislative Assembly
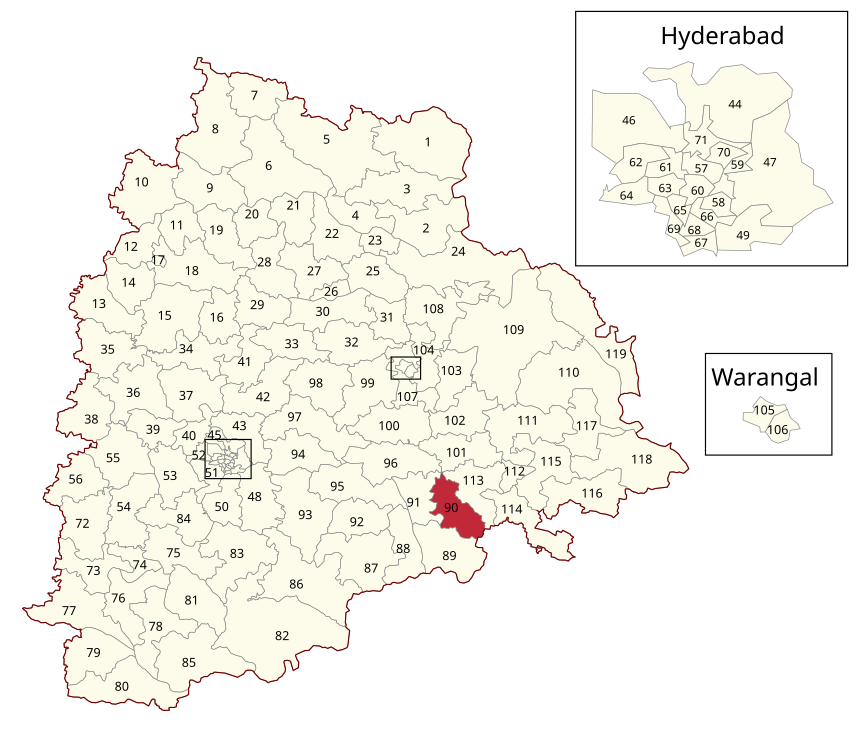
- Location of Kodad Assembly constituency within Telangana

Constituency details
- Country: India
- Region: South India
- State: Telangana
- District: Suryapet
- Lok Sabha constituency: Nalgonda
- Established: 1978
- Total electors: 2,25,714
- Reservation: None

Member of Legislative Assembly
- 3rd Telangana Legislative Assembly
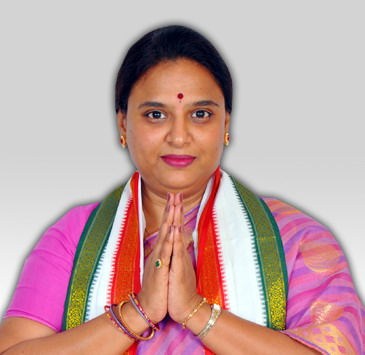
- Incumbent Nalamada Padmavathi Reddy
- Party: Indian National Congress
- Elected year: 2023

Kodad Assembly constituency is a constituency of the Telangana, India. It is one of four constituencies in Suryapet district. It consists of six mandals. It is part of Nalgonda Lok Sabha constituency.

The current MLA is Nalamada Padmavathi Reddy of Indian National Congress, who won by 58,172 votes in 2023 State Assembly General elections held on 30 November.

== Mandals ==
After the recent delimitation, Kodad Assembly Constituency comprises the following Mandals:

Mandal
Kodad
Mothey
Nadigudem
Munagala
Chilkur
Ananthagiri

== Members of the Legislative Assembly ==
Term	Name	Party
2023-	Nalamada Padmavathi Reddy	Indian National Congress
2018-2023	Bollam Mallaiah Yadav	Bharat Rashtra Samithi
2014-2018	Nalamada Padmavathi Reddy	Indian National Congress
2009–2014	Venepalli Chander Rao	Telugu Desam Party
2004–2009	Nalamada Uttam Kumar Reddy	Indian National Congress
1999–2004	Nalamada Uttam Kumar Reddy	Indian National Congress
1994–1999	Venepalli Chander Rao	Telugu Desam Party
1989–1994	Venepalli Chander Rao	Telugu Desam Party
1985–1989	Venepalli Chander Rao	Telugu Desam Party
1983–1985	Veerapalli Laxminarayana Rao	Telugu Desam Party
1978–1983	Akkiraju Vasudeva Rao	Janata Party

== Election results ==
=== Telangana Legislative Assembly election, 2023 ===
Telangana Assembly Elections, 2023: Kodad
Party	Candidate	Votes	%	±%
INC	Nalamada Padmavathi Reddy	125,783	60.19	
BRS	Bollam Mallaiah Yadav	67,611	32.35	
BSP	Pillutla Srinivas	3,369	1.61	
JSP	Mekala Satheesh Reddy	1,197	0.58	
CPI(M)	Mattapalli Saidulu	1,195	0.57	
Alliance of Democratic Reforms Party	Shekuri Mallaiah	1,044	0.50	
Independent	Kollu Lakshminarayana Rao	1,009	0.48	
Independent	Inugurti Venkata Ramana	918	0.44	
NOTA	None of the Above	887	0.42	
Majority		58,172	27.84	
Turnout		2,08,992		
INC gain from BRS		Swing		

=== Telangana Legislative Assembly election, 2018 ===
2018 Telangana Legislative Assembly election: Kodad
Party	Candidate	Votes	%	±%
TRS	Bollam Mallaiah Yadav	89,115	45.96%	
INC	Nalamada Padmavathi Reddy	88,359	45.57%	
Independent	Anji Yadav	5,240	2.70	
CPI(M)	Burri Sriramulu	3,381	1.74	
NOTA	None of the Above	1,240	0.64	
Majority		756		
Turnout		1,93,888	89.44%	
TRS gain from INC		Swing		

=== Telangana Legislative Assembly election, 2014 ===
2014 Telangana Legislative Assembly election: Kodad
Party	Candidate	Votes	%	±%
INC	Nalamada Padmavathi Reddy	81,966	45.4%	
TDP	Bollam Mallaiah Yadav	68,592	38.0%	
TRS	Kanmantha Reddy Shashidhar Reddy	5,404	7.4%	
Majority		13,374		
Turnout		1,81,326	85.0%	
INC gain from TDP		Swing		

=== Andhra Pradesh Legislative Assembly election, 2009 ===
2009 Andhra Pradesh Legislative Assembly election: Kodad
Party	Candidate	Votes	%	±%
TDP	Chander Rao Vanepally	64,742	39.47%	
INC	Md. Mahaboob Jani	54,918	33.48%	
PRP	Gagadam Sudhakar Rao	21,839	13.31%	

== See also ==
- List of constituencies of Telangana Legislative Assembly
- Kodad
