= Huzurnagar Assembly constituency =

Constituency of the Telangana legislative assembly in India

Coordinates: 16.90°N 79.87°E

Huzurnagar
- Constituency No. 89 for the Telangana Legislative Assembly
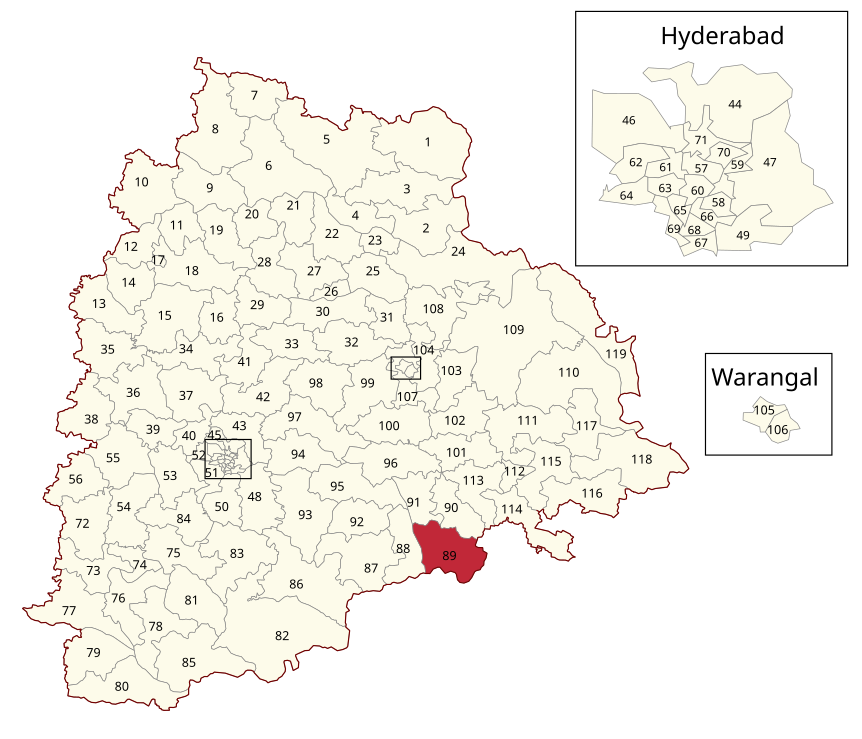
- Location of Huzurnagar Assembly constituency within Telangana

Constituency details
- Country: India
- Region: South India
- State: Telangana
- District: Suryapet
- Lok Sabha constituency: Nalgonda
- Total electors: 2,30,359
- Reservation: None

Member of Legislative Assembly
- 3rd Telangana Legislative Assembly
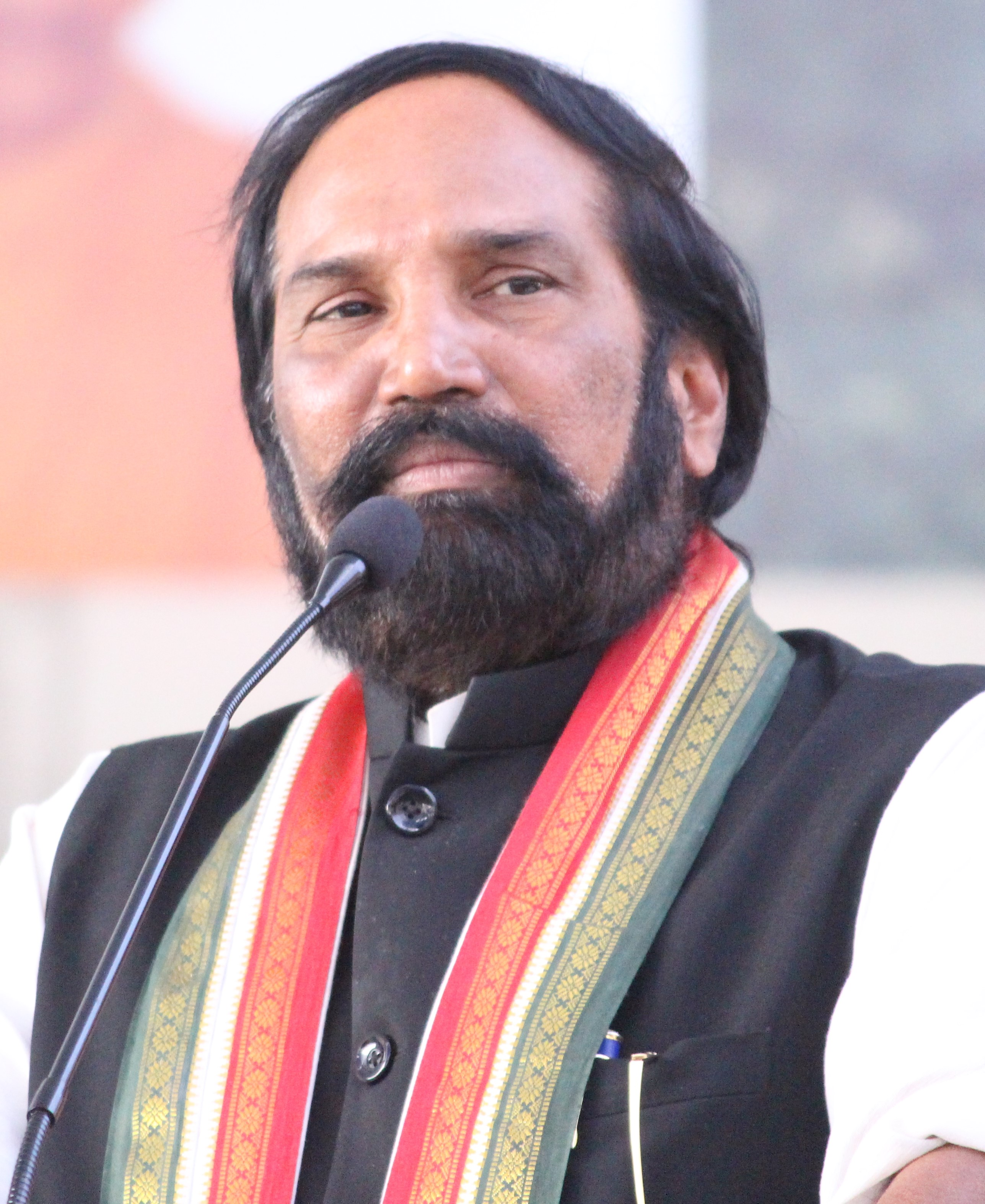
- Incumbent Nalamada Uttam Kumar Reddy
- Party: Indian National Congress
- Elected year: 2023

Huzurnagar Assembly constituency is a constituency of the Telangana Legislative Assembly, India. It is one of four constituencies in Suryapet district. It is part of Nalgonda Lok Sabha constituency.

== Mandals ==
After the recent delimitation, Huzurnagar Assembly Constituency comprises the following Mandals: Huzurnagar, Neredcherla, Garidepally, Mattampally, Mellachervu, Chinthalapalem and Palakeedu.

== Members of the Legislative Assembly ==
Year	Name	Party
United Andhra Pradesh
2009	Nalamada Uttam Kumar Reddy	Indian National Congress
Telangana Legislative Assembly
2014	Nalamada Uttam Kumar Reddy	Indian National Congress
2018	Nalamada Uttam Kumar Reddy	Indian National Congress
2019★	Shanampudi Saidireddy	Telangana Rashtra Samithi
2023	Nalamada Uttam Kumar Reddy	Indian National Congress

★by-election

== Election results ==
=== Telangana Legislative Assembly election, 2023 ===
Telangana Assembly Elections, 2023: Huzurnagar (Assembly constituency)
Party	Candidate	Votes	%	±%
INC	Nalamada Uttam Kumar Reddy	116,707	54.21	
BRS	Saidi Reddy	71,819	33.36	
AIFB	Pillutla Raghu	8,280	3.85	
BJP	Challa Srilatha Reddy	3,715	1.73	
NOTA	None of the above	843	0.39	
Majority		44,888	20.85	
Turnout		2,15,298		
INC gain from BRS		Swing		

=== Assembly by-election 2019 ===
By-election, 2019: Huzurnagar
Party	Candidate	Votes	%	±%
TRS	Saidi Reddy	113,095		
INC	Nalamada Padmavathi Reddy	69,737		
Independent	Sapavath Suman	2,697		
BJP	Dr.Kota Rama Rao	2,639		
NOTA	None of the above	2,639		
Majority		43,358		
Turnout		2,00,248	84.73	
TRS gain from INC		Swing		

=== Telangana Legislative Assembly election, 2018 ===
2018 Telangana Legislative Assembly election: Huzurnagar
Party	Candidate	Votes	%	±%
INC	N.Uttam Kumar Reddy	92,996	47.82	+8.88
TRS	Sanampudi Saidi Reddy	85,530	43.98	+18.37
Independent	Raghuma Reddy Mekala	4,944	2.54	
CPI(M)	Parepally Sekhar Rao	2,121	1.09	
NOTA	None of the above	1,621	0.83	+0.36
Majority		7,466	3.87	
Turnout		1,94,493	86.95	
INC hold		Swing		

=== Telangana Legislative Assembly election, 2014 ===
2014 Telangana Legislative Assembly election: Huzurnagar
Party	Candidate	Votes	%	±%
INC	N.Uttam Kumar Reddy	69,879	38.94	−9.34
TRS	Kasoju Shankaramma	45,955	25.61	−5.23
YSRCP	Gattu Srikanth Reddy	29,692	16.55	
TDP	Swamy Goud Vangala	25,395	14.15	
NOTA	None of the above	851	0.47	
Majority		23,924	13.33	
Turnout		1,79,511	81.54	
INC hold		Swing		

=== Andhra Pradesh Legislative Assembly election, 2009 ===
Andhra Pradesh Assembly Elections, 2009: Huzurnagar (Assembly constituency)
Party	Candidate	Votes	%	±%
INC	N.Uttam Kumar Reddy	80,835	48.28%	
TRS	Guntakandla Jagadish Reddy	51,641	30.84%	
PRP	Srinivasa Rao Mekala	22,612	13.50%	

== See also ==
- List of constituencies of Telangana Legislative Assembly
- Huzurnagar
