= Kodad mandal =

- Mandal
- Location in Telangana, India Kodad mandal (India)
- Coordinates: 16°59′52″N 79°57′55″E
- Country: India
- State: Telangana
- District: Suryapet
- Headquarters: Kodad

Area
  - Total: 232.99 km^{2} (89.96 sq mi)

Population (2011)
  - Total: 107,288
  - Density: 460.48/km^{2} (1,192.6/sq mi)

Languages
  - Official: Telugu
- Time zone: UTC+5:30 (IST)

Kodad mandal is one of the 23 mandals in Suryapet district of the Indian state of Telangana. It is under the administration of Kodad revenue division with its headquarters at Kodad. The mandal is located on the banks of Paler river and is bounded by Nadigudem, Munagala, Chilkur, Huzurnagar, Mellachervu mandals. A portion of it also borders Khammam district and the state of Andhra Pradesh.

== Towns and villages ==
As of 2011 census of India, the mandal has 12 settlements. It includes 1 town and 11 villages.

The settlements in the mandal are listed below:

1. Kodad (CT) †
2. Dorakunta
3. Chimiryala
4. Ganapavaram
5. Gudibanda
6. Kapugal
7. Komarabanda
8. Kuchipudi
9. Redlakunta
10. Tammarabanda Palem
11. Thogarrai
12. Yerravaram

Notes
(†) Mandal headquarter
