= Mallareddygudem mandal =

Mallareddygudem mandal మల్లారెడ్డిగూడెం మండలం
- Mandal
- Location in Telangana, India
- Coordinates: 16.81732°N 79.93309°E
- Country: India
- State: Telangana
- District: Suryapet
- Headquarters: Chintalapalem

Population (2011)
  - Total: 36,542

Languages
  - Official: Telugu
- Time zone: UTC+5:30 (IST)
- PIN: 508246
- Vehicle registration: TS 29

Mallareddygudem mandal is one of the 23 mandals in Suryapet district of the Indian state of Telangana. It is under the administration of Huzurnagar revenue division with its headquarters at Chintalapalem. It is bounded by Mattampally mandal towards the west, Mellachervu mandal towards the north, Krishna district of Andhra Pradesh towards the east. Pulichinthala Project is located nearby.

== Demographics ==
Mallareddygudem mandal is having a population of 36,542. Reballe is the smallest village and Dondapadu is the biggest village in the mandal.

== Villages ==
As of 2011 census of India, the mandal has 10 settlements. The settlements in the mandal are listed below:

1. Chintalapalem (CT) †
2. Dondapadu
3. Vajinepalle
4. Gudimalkapuram
5. Thammaram
6. Chintriyala
7. Reballe
8. Adlur
9. Vellatur
10. Nemalipuri

Notes
(†) Mandal headquarter
