= List of Smart and AMRUT Cities in Telangana =

List of Smart and AMRUT Cities in Telangana (SMART CITIES MISSION)
- Country: India
- Prime Minister(s): Narendra Modi
- Ministry: MoUD
- Key people: Venkaiah Naidu
- Launched: 2015
- Funding: ₹98,000 crore (US$10 billion)
- Status: Active

List of Smart and AMRUT Cities in Telangana (AMRUT)
- Country: India
- Prime Minister(s): Narendra Modi
- Ministry: MoUD
- Key people: Venkaiah Naidu
- Established: 24 June 2015; 11 years ago
- Status: Active

A number of cities in the Indian state of Telangana have been designated for infrastructure improvement under the Indian Government's Smart Cities Mission and AMRUT (Atal Mission for Rejuvenation and Urban Transformation) programmes.

Note: The statistical data represented in this article is based on "smartcitiesprojects", urban renewal projects launched by Prime Minister Narendra Modi in June 2015 to improve urban infrastructure.

== Smart Cities ==
Smart Cities Mission is an urban renewal and retrofitting program by the Government of India with a mission to develop 100 cities (the target has been revised to 109 cities) all over the country making them citizen friendly and sustainable. The Union Ministry of Urban Development is responsible for implementing the mission in collaboration with the state governments of the respective cities. The government has a vision of developing 100 smart cities as satellite towns of larger cities by modernising the existing mid-sized cities.

Currently Telangana state includes three Smart Cities.

== AMRUT Cities ==
AMRUT (Atal Mission for Rejuvenation and Urban Transformation) is a scheme launched by Prime Minister Narendra Modi in June 2015 aiming at adequate robust sewerage networks and water supply for urban transformation. Rajasthan was the first state in the country to submit State Annual Action Plan under AMRUT.

The Telangana state government has submitted a plan to enhance water supply in 12 AMRUT cities in the state during the fiscal year 2015–16.

== Smart and AMRUT cities of Telangana ==
Rank	City	District	Type	Population (2011)	Status	Ref
1	Hyderabad	Hyderabad	Greater M.Corp	6,809,970	Smart City	
2	Warangal (Note: Forty two gram panchayats were merged in the city on 19 March 2013. Warangal Municipal Corporation.)	Warangal (Urban)	Greater M.Corp	811,844	Smart City	
3	Karimnagar	Karimnagar	M.Corp	397,447	Smart City	
7	Nizamabad	Nizamabad	M.Corp	310,467	AMRUT	
5	Ramagundam	Peddapalli	M.Corp	229,632	AMRUT	
6	Khammam	Khammam	M.Corp	184,252	AMRUT	
7	Mahabubnagar	Mahabubnagar	M.Corp	157,902	AMRUT	
4	Nalgonda	Nalgonda	M.Corp	599,163	Smartcity	
9	Adilabad	Adilabad	M	117,388	AMRUT	
10	Miryalaguda	Nalgonda	M	109,891	AMRUT	
11	Suryapet	Suryapet	M	105,250	AMRUT	
12	Siddipet	Siddipet	M	101,358	AMRUT	

== See also ==
- List of cities in India by area
- List of cities in Telangana by area
- List of cities in Telangana by population
