= Janpahad =

Village in Telangana, India

Janpahad Janapahad
- Village
- Location within Telangana Location within India
- Coordinates: 16°44′33″N 79°43′29″E
- Country: India
- State: Telangana
- District: Suryapet
- Mandal: Palakeedu

Government
  - Type: Gram Panchayat

Area
  - Total: 29.66 km^{2} (11.45 sq mi)
- Elevation: 77 m (253 ft)

Population (2010)
  - Total: 3,979
  - Density: 134.2/km^{2} (347.5/sq mi)

Languages
  - Official: Telugu
- Time zone: UTC+5:30 (IST)
- PIN: 508218
- STD code: 08683
- Vehicle registration: TS-29

Janpahad or Janapahad, is a small village in Palakeedu Mandal, Suryapet District, Telangana, India. It is located near state border with Andhra Pradesh, about 7 kilometres southeast of the mandal headquarters Palakeedu, and 45 kilometres south of the district headquarter Suryapet. As of the year 2010, it has a total population of 3,979.

== Geography ==
Janpahad is situated to the north bank of Krishna River, on the southern bank of Janpahad Lake. Its average elevation is 77 metres above the sea level.

== Demographics ==
According to the 2011 Indian Census, there are 1,069 households within Janpahad. Among the 3,979 inhabitants, 2,007 are male and 1,972 are female. The total literacy rate is 44.76%, with 1,099 of the male population and 682 of the female population being literate. Its census location code is 577538.
