= Chimiryala =

Chimiryala a village of Suryapet district in Andhra Pradesh state, India. It is 7 km from Kodad, and situated on National Highway 65 (India) ( Formerly NH 9).
