= Mallaiah =

Mallaiah is a given name. Notable people with the name include:

- Bollam Mallaiah Yadav (born 1965), Indian politician
- Somanahalli Mallaiah Krishna (1932–2024), Indian politician
