= Ananthagiri mandal =

Ananthagirimandal అనంతగిరి మండలం
- Mandal
- Location in Telangana, India
- Coordinates: 17°03′16.8″N 79°59′20.8″E
- Country: India
- State: Telangana
- District: Suryapet
- Headquarters: Ananthagiri

Population (2011)
  - Total: 29,155

Languages
  - Official: Telugu
- Time zone: UTC+5:30 (IST)
- PIN: 508206
- Vehicle registration: TS 29

Ananthagiri mandal is one of the 23 mandals in Suryapet district of the Indian state of Telangana. It is under the administration of Kodad revenue division with its headquarters at Ananthagiri. It is carved out from Kodad and Nadigudem mandals. It is bounded by Nadigudem in the west, Kodad mandal in the south and Khammam district towards north.

== Demographics ==
Ananthagiri mandal has a population of 29,155.

== Villages ==
The mandal has 10 settlements. The settlements in the mandal are listed below:

1. Ananthagiri (CT) †
2. Ameenabad
3. Palavaram
4. Chanupally
5. Yasanthapuram
6. Singavaram
7. Tripuraram
8. Gondriyala
9. Lakmavaram
10. Khanapuram
11. Tiru Annaram

Notes
(†) Mandal headquarter

== See also ==
List of mandals in Andhra Pradesh
