= Urban agglomerations in Telangana =

In the 2011 Census of India, an urban agglomeration was defined as "An urban agglomeration is a continuous urban spread constituting a town and its adjoining outgrowths, or two or more physically contiguous towns together with or without outgrowths of such towns. An Urban Agglomeration must consist of at least a statutory town and its total population (i.e. all the constituents put together) should not be less than 20,000 as per the 2001 Census."

Top 10 largest urban agglomerations in Telangana

Urban agglomerations in the state of Telangana with a population of above 100,000 based on the Census of India of 2024
Rank	Name	District	Population (2011)
1	Hyderabad	Hyderabad; Medchal-Malkajgiri; Rangareddy; Sangareddy	1,86,31,754
2	Warangal	Hanamkonda	14,11,036
3	Nizamabad	Nizamabad	696,543
4	Karimnagar	Karimnagar	702,721
5	Khammam	Khammam	654,656
6	Ramagundam	Peddapalli	373,865
7	Mahabubnagar	Mahabubnagar	491,858
8	Mancherial	Mancherial	496,643
9	Nalgonda	Nalgonda	192,703
10	Adilabad	Adilabad	185,752
11	Kottagudem	Bhadradri Kottagudem	267,953
12	Siddipet	Siddipet	190,743
13	Suryapet	Suryapet	189,155
14	Miryalaguda	Nalgonda	162,003
15	Jagtial	Jagtial	148,715

== See also ==
- Demographics of India
- List of cities in Telangana by population
- List of districts of Telangana
- List of million-plus urban agglomerations in India
- List of most populous metropolitan areas in India
- List of states and union territories of India by population
