= Meela Satyanarayana =

Indian businessman and industrialist

Meela Satyanarayana was an Indian businessman, philanthropist and industrialist. He was the founder of Sudhakar PVC Pipes.

== Career ==
During the 1970s, Satyanarayana played an instrumental role in transforming Andhra Pradesh state-based cities Suryapet and Nalgonda as a business hub of South India by establishing Sudhakar PVC Pipes.

He served as the President of the Andhra Pradesh Plastic Manufacturers Association in 1984. He also served as the municipal chairman of Suryapet for a three-year period between 1989 and 1992, where he undertook initiatives on community development and social welfare initiatives. He also controlled rice mills and fertilizer stores under his ownership.

In the 1990s, he volunteered to provide job employment opportunities to several youngsters during the peak of the drought season, which affected Nalgonda district. He realized many youths were leaving Nalgonda in pursuit of better career opportunities for the improvement of their livelihoods.

== Death ==
He died on 25 June 2019 at the age of 88 in Hyderabad due to an age-related illness. He was admitted to a private hospital in Hyderabad after his health conditions deteriorated. Minister for Education G. Jagadeesh Reddy paid tributes to Satyanarayana by indicating that his contributions to the municipality are still being acknowledged by the public.
