= List of cities in Kerala by area =

The article lists major cities in Kerala based on the total area coming under the jurisdiction of city corporations/municipalities. This list is based on the 2011 Census of India.

Rank	City	Area in km^{2} (corporation)
1	Thiruvananthapuram	214.86
2	Kozhikode	118.58
3	Thrissur	101.42
4	Kochi	94.88
5	Kannur	78.35
6	Kollam	73.03

**Note:-

- The figures mentioned in the article are only based on the area coming under the jurisdiction of corporations and municipalities. This has no relation with the metro areas.

== See also ==
- List of cities in India by area
- List of states and union territories of India by area
