= Mattampally =

Coordinates: 16°51′21″N 79°53′37″E

- Village
- Interactive map of Mattampally
- Country: India
- State: Telangana
- District: Suryapet

Languages
  - Official: Telugu
- Time zone: UTC+5:30 (IST)
- Vehicle registration: TS 29
- Climate: hot (Köppen)
- Website: telangana.gov.in

Mattampally is a village in the Suryapet district, Telangana, India. It is located 13 km from the banks of the Krishna River, in Mattampally mandal of Kodad revenue division. It is located about 69 km from the district headquarters Suryapet.
