= Bollam Mallaiah Yadav =

Indian politician

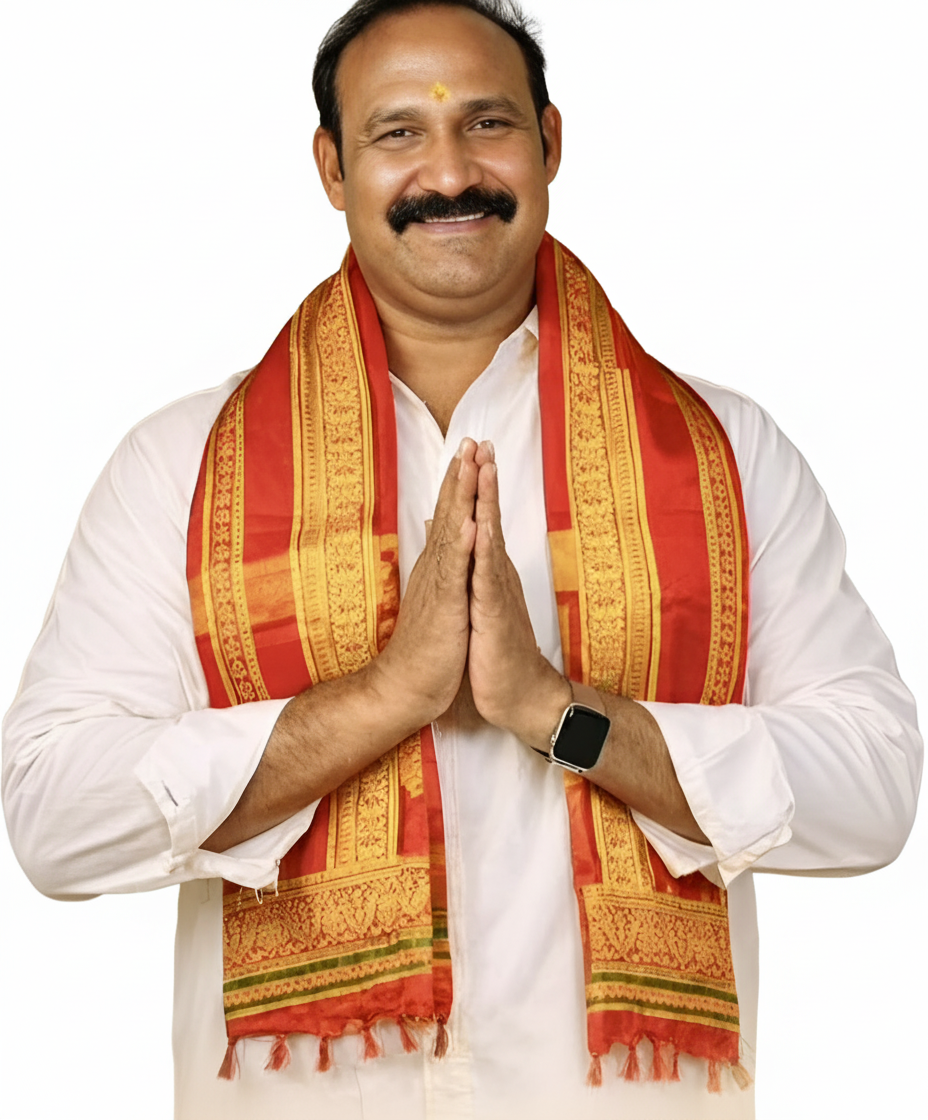

Member of Telangana Legislative Assembly
- In office 2018–2023
- Preceded by: Nalamada Padmavathi Reddy
- Succeeded by: Nalamada Padmavathi Reddy
- Constituency: Kodad

Personal details
- Born: 14 August 1965; 60 years ago Suryapet, Telangana
- Party: Telangana Rashtra Samithi
- Spouse: Indira
- Children: 2 Sons, 1 Daughter
- Education: M.A From Osmania University

Bollam Mallaiah Yadav is a member of the Telangana Legislative Assembly representing Kodad constituency. He belongs to the Telangana Rashtra Samithi party.

== Electoral history ==
Election results
Year	Office	Constituency	Candidate	Party	Votes	%	Opponent	Opponent party	Votes	%	Result	Ref
2023	MLA	Kodad	Bollam Mallaiah Yadav	Telangana Rashtra Samithi	67,611	32.35	Padmavathi Reddy Nalamada	Indian National Congress	1,25,783	60.19	Lost	
2018	MLA	Kodad	Bollam Mallaiah Yadav	Telangana Rashtra Samithi	89,115	46	Padmavathi Reddy Nalamada	Indian National Congress	88,359	46	Won	
2014	MLA	Kodad	Bollam Mallaiah Yadav	Telugu Desam Party	68,592	–	Padmavathi Reddy Nalamada	Indian National Congress	81,966	–	Lost	
