= Mellachervu mandal =

Mellachervu mandal మేళ్లచెరువు మండలం
- Mandal
- Location in Telangana, India
- Coordinates: 16.81732°N 79.93309°E
- Country: India
- State: Telangana
- District: Suryapet
- Headquarters: Mellachervu

Population (2011)
  - Total: 38,140

Languages
  - Official: Telugu
- Time zone: UTC+5:30 (IST)
- PIN: 508246
- Vehicle registration: TS 29

Mellachervu mandal is one of the 23 mandals in Suryapet district of the Indian state of Telangana. It is under the administration of Huzurnagar revenue division with its headquarters at Mellachervu. It is bounded by Mattampally mandal towards west, Huzurnagar mandal towards North, Mallareddygudem mandal towards South, Krishna district of Andhra Pradesh towards East.

== Demographics ==
Mellachervu mandal has a population of 38,140 . Yepalamadhavaram is the smallest Village and Mellachervu is the biggest Village in the mandal.

== Villages ==
As of 2011 census of India, the mandal has 4 settlements. The settlements in the mandal are listed below:

1. Mellachervu (CT) †
2. Revoor
3. Yepalamadhavaram
4. Kandibanda

Notes
(†) Mandal headquarter
