= Vadapally =

Vadapally Wadapally
- Village
- Location within Telangana
- Coordinates: 16.698°N 79.659°E
- Country: India
- State: Telangana
- District: Nalgonda
- Established: Unknown
- Named for: Cement Industries

Government
  - C M: A. Revanth reddy.
  - MLA: B. Lakshma Reddy
  - MP: K. Raghuveer

Languages
  - Official: Telugu Urdu
- Time zone: UTC+5:30 (IST)
- PIN: 508355
- Telephone code: +91-8689
- Vehicle registration: TG 05
- Sex ratio: 1000:995 ?/?
- Literacy: 82.09%
- Website: telangana.gov.in

Vadapally, or Wadapally, formerly known as Vazeerabad, is a village in Nalgonda district of Telangana, India, near Miryalaguda. Vadapally comes under the assembly constituency of Miryalaguda, 24 km (15 mi) from the village.

Vadapally is a major producer of cement in the Nalgonda district due to the availability of limestone nearby and in the neighboring Guntur district of Andhra Pradesh.

== Location ==
Vadapally is located at the confluence of the Krishna and Musi rivers on the border of Telangana and Andhra Pradesh.

== Religion ==
Vadapally is home to two major temples: the Sri Meenakshi Agasteswara Swami temple and Sri Lakshmi Narasimha Swami's temple. According to the Puranas, Vyasa Bhagavan knowing the sacredness of the confluence of the Krishna and the Musi, meditated there for the manifestation of Sri Narasimha Swamy. Lord Maha Vishnu transfigured as Narasimha Swamy and appeared to the former as a lion. Vyasa Bhagavan entreated Sri Narasimha Swamy to manifest at Wadapally in that form only.

There are two mosques in Vadapally of historical importance: Masjid-e-Sara-e-Meer-Alam and Qutub Shahi mosques.

== Industry ==
There are many polish mills, cement and power plants are there in Vadapally. India Cements has a Cement plant at Vishnupuram under Wadapally village limits. It is under expansion with an expenditure of Rs. 700 million.

== Transportation ==
Vadapally is 25 km (16 mi) from Miryalaguda. Wadapally is well connected by road and there are frequent buses from Miryalaguda. Private transport is available from Miryalaguda. Wadapally is accessible by bus and train from Nalgonda, Suryapet, Miryalaguda, Hyderabad, Guntur, Nellore, Secunderabad, Tirupathi, Dachepalle.

== Schools ==
- Z.P.H. School
- Aravinda Vidyalayam, Gandhi Nagar
- D.A.V. public School, India cements colony
