= Shanampudi Saidireddy =

Indian politician

Member of Telangana Legislative Assembly
- In office October 2019 – December 2023
- Preceded by: N. Uttam Kumar Reddy
- Succeeded by: N. Uttam Kumar Reddy
- Constituency: Huzurnagar

Personal details
- Born: 18 April 1974 (age 52) Gundlapally, Suryapet district
- Party: Bharatiya Janata Party
- Other political affiliations: Bharat Rashtra Samithi
- Spouse: Rajitha Reddy
- Children: Ankit Reddy, Anirudh Reddy
- Parent(s): Anki Reddy (died in 1998) (Father); Sathyavathi Reddy (Mother)

Shanampudi Saidireddy (Telugu: శానంపూడి సైదిరెడ్డి; born 18 April 1974) is an Indian politician and present MLA for Huzurnagar assembly constituency representing the Bharat Rashtra Samithi. He became the MLA for Huzurnagar assembly constituency after defeating the Congress candidate by a record margin in the by election in 2019.

== Early life ==
Saidireddy was born on 18 April 1974 at Gundlapally village of Mattampally Mandal in Suryapet District to Anki Reddy and Sathyavathi and he has 2 siblings. He did his initial schooling in Mattampally and graduated in B.Sc. from Priyadarshini college in Huzurnagar.

== Professional life ==
Saidireddy emigrated to Jamaica after his graduation. After initially working as a lecturer he joined the United Nations population fund as an IT Manager. He later moved to Canada and set up a successful restaurant business, and later started an Engineering college in Suryapet.

== Political life ==
Saidireddy returned to India in 2015. He started to work on social issues in Telangana and in his native Huzurnagar. He focused on youth development and women empowerment. He started a Youth organization under the name Sye which was very successful in mobilizing the youth in his native Huzurnagar. He was given the ticket to contest from TRS in 2018. He lost the election by a narrow margin of 7000 odd votes. However in the subsequent by election held in 2019 he was again nominated and he won with a record margin of 43,000 votes.

Saidireddy resigned to BRS party and joined the Bharatiya Janata Party on 10 March 2024 in the presence of party's General Secretary and Telangana state incharge Tarun Chugh at central party headquarters in New Delhi ahead of 2024 Lok Sabha elections.

== Personal life ==
He is married to Rajitha Reddy, who is also an entrepreneur, and has 2 children with her.
