= Kondrapole =

Kondrapole KondraPole
- village
- Location in Telangana, India Kondrapole (India)
- Coordinates: 16.785°N 79.611°E
- Country: India
- State: Telangana
- Elevation: 115 m (377 ft)

Population
  - Total: 5,000

Languages
  - Official: Telugu
- Time zone: UTC+5:30 (IST)
- PIN: 508355

Kondrapole is a village located in the Damarchrla Mandal of the Nalgonda district in the Indian state of Telangana. This hilly village is known for its multi-cultural population.

== Geography ==
Kondrapole is located 1.25 km from the built-up area, and its altitude ranges from 107 meters to 123 meters above sea level.

== Economy ==
The village has a small lake, which is usually taken by fish contractors for fish farms. These contractors export fish to different cities each year during the summer. Additionally, the rice fields in Kondrapole are famous, and people wake up early in the morning to work in them.

== Transportation ==
The state highway SH-2, known as the Narketpally-Addanki Haiway road, passes through Kondrapole. The main road to Hyderabad is accessible from Vijayawada Chennai. The village also has a railway station that is part of the first Telangana Railway Line.

== Power supply ==
Kondrapole has a substation for power, ensuring a reliable supply of electricity to the village.

== Education ==
Kondrapole has several educational institutions that serve the students of the village as well as those from nearby villages and tandals. The village has a primary school up to the 5th grade, as well as a Zilla Parishat High School for students in grades 6 to 10. In addition, there are several private schools, including Kakatiya Vidyalaya, Netaji Public School, and Model School. There is also a school and junior college located 3 km away in Neyar.

Many students from Kondrapole have gone on to pursue higher education at prestigious institutions like the Indian Institutes of Technology (IIT) or have settled in foreign countries. The village also has many government positions available.

== Healthcare ==
Kondrapole has a government primary care hospital, a government veterinary hospital, and several small private clinics that cater to the healthcare needs of the villagers.

== Culture and festivals ==
The village celebrates several festivals throughout the year, including Ganagamma jathara, Mackeraskanti / Pongal, Maha Shivratri, Telugu New Year / Ugadi, Ramanavami, Ganesh Chaturthi, Ramadan, Dassara, Diwali, and Christmas.

== Religious sites ==
Kondrapole has several religious sites that attract devotees from across the region. The village is home to a Shivaling Temple, Anjaneya Swamy Temple, Guntu Mysumman Temple, and several Ram Temples. The village also has a mosque for Muslim residents.
