= List of cities and towns in Telangana =

This is a list of cities (excluding urban agglomerations) with a population of above 100,000 and towns with a population of above 20,000 in the state of Telangana.

== Categorization ==
City: or Class I Town: Towns with population of 100,000 and above are called cities. As of 2011, there are nine municipal corporations and six municipalities in the state with populations above 100,000.

Class II Towns: Towns with population between 50,000 and 99,999

Class III Towns: Towns with population between 20,000 and 49,999

Note: The statistical data represented here is based on "Census of India 2011", conducted by "The Office of the Registrar General and Census Commissioner, India" under the Ministry of Home Affairs, Government of India

The districts in Telangana were organized in 2016 and later in 2019, increasing from 10 to 33. As the census reports are based on the old districts in 2011, the cities and towns are categorized under both the present and erstwhile district.

== List of Cities ==
The following are the cities with populations above 1,00,000 according to the 2024 Census.

Rank	City	District	Civic Status	Population (2024)	Area (km^{2}) (As per MC)	Ref.
1	Hyderabad	Hyderabad; Medchal–Malkajgiri; Ranga Reddy; Sangareddy	M.Corp	12,052,545	2,053	
2	Warangal (Note: Limits of the city have expanded since 2011. The given figure includes the 2011 census figures for the post-2011 expansions and differ from the original 2011 census listing.)	Warangal; Hanamkonda	M.Corp	1,241,844	457.77	
3	Nizamabad	Nizamabad	M.Corp	498,865	169.37	
4	Karimnagar	Karimnagar	M.Corp	493,997	204.50	
5	Khammam	Khammam	M.Corp	485,954	94.45	
6	Ramagundam	Peddapalli	M.Corp	269,081	93.87	
7	Mahabubnagar	Mahabubnagar	M.Corp	273,802	98.64	
8	Mancherial	Mancherial	M.Corp	278,739	155.93	
9	Kothagudem	Bhadradri Kothagudem district	M.Corp	258,633	86.10	
10	Nalgonda	Nalgonda	M.Corp	243,615	105.00	
11	Suryapet	Suryapet	M Grade-1	171,356	35.00	
12	Adilabad	Adilabad	M Grade-1	169,891	35.50	
13	Miryalaguda	Nalgonda	M Grade-1	156,000	28.36	
14	Siddipet	Siddipet	M Grade-1	111,838	55.00	
15	Jagtial	Jagtial	M Grade-1	103,930	45.00	

== Class II towns ==
The following are the towns with populations above 50,000 according to the 2024 Census.

Rank	Town	District	Erstwhile District	Civic Status	Population (2024)	Area(sq.km)	Ref.
16	Nirmal	Nirmal	Adilabad	M Grade-2	146,308	32.06	
17	Armoor	Nizamabad	Nizamabad	M Grade-2	110,496	42	
18	Sircilla	Rajanna Sircilla	Karimnagar	M Grade-1	104,235	59.56	
19	Kamareddy	Kamareddy	Nizamabad	M Grade-2	139,892	14.10	
20	Palwancha	Bhadradri Kothagudem	Khammam	M Grade-2	Merged in KOTHAGUDEM	26.38	
21	Bodhan	Nizamabad	Nizamabad	M Grade-2	79,654	35.40	
22	Sangareddy	Sangareddy	Medak	M Grade-1	124,092	13.70	
23	Metpally	Jagtial	Karimnagar	M Grade-1	69,782	23.45	
24	Zaheerabad	Sangareddy	Medak	M Grade-3	120,497	21.78	
25	Korutla	Jagtial	Karimnagar	M Grade-1	78,359	34.10	
26	Tandur	Vikarabad	Rangareddy	M Grade-2	82,407	21.50	
27	Kodad	Suryapet	Nalgonda	M Grade-2	103,655	31.19	
28	Gadwal	Jogulamba Gadwal	Mahabubnagar	M Grade-2	81,362	33.46	
29	Wanaparthy	Wanaparthy	Mahabubnagar	M Grade-3	80,457	27.03	
30	Kagaznagar	Komaram Bheem	Adilabad	M Grade-3	62,272	8.31	
31	Bellampalle	Mancherial	Adilabad	M Grade-3	71,077	35.06	
32	Khanapuram Haveli	Khammam	Khammam	CT	53,442	12.70	
33	Bhuvanagiri	Yadadri Bhuvanagiri	Nalgonda	M Grade-2	72,983	76.537	
34	Vikarabad	Vikarabad	Rangareddy	M Grade-2	59,255	31.70	
35	Mahabubabad	Mahabubabad	Warangal	M Grade-2	78,963	44.99	
36	Jangaon	Jangaon	Warangal	M Grade-2	70,674	17.49	
37	Mandamarri	Mancherial	Adilabad	M Grade-3	78,933	38.84	
38	Badepally	Mahabubnagar	Mahabubnagar	M Grade-2	78,244	10.37	
39	Bhadrachalam	Bhadradri Kothagudem	Khammam	CT	58,651	12.00	

== Class III towns ==
The following are the Class III towns with populations above 20,000 according to the 2024 Census.

S.No.	Town	District	Erstwhile District	Civic Status	Population (2024)	Ref.
40	Bhainsa	Nirmal	Adilabad	M Grade-3	62,358	
41	Medak	Medak	Medak	M Grade-2	63,987	
42	Bhupalpally	Jayashankar Bhupalpally	Warangal	Nagara Panchayat	54,133	
43	Narayanpet	Narayanpet	Mahabubnagar	M Grade-3	49,905	
44	Peddapalli	Peddapalli	Karimnagar	M Grade-2	64,286	
45	Huzurnagar	Suryapet	Nalgonda	M Grade-3	42,736	
46	Kyathanpally	Mancherial	Adilabad	M Grade-3	56,773	
47	Manuguru	Bhadradri Kothagudem	Khammam	M Grade-3	54,954	
48	Naspur	Mancherial	Adilabad	M Grade-3	Merged in Mancherial M.Corp	
49	Narsampet	Warangal	Warangal	CT	66,735	
50	Devarakonda	Nalgonda	Nalgonda	M Grade-3	51,359	
52	Dubbaka	Siddipet	Medak	M Grade-3	41,944	
55	Nakrekal	Nalgonda	Nalgonda	M Grade-3	46,753	
56	Banswada	Kamareddy	Nizamabad	M Grade-3	49,553	
57	Kalwakurthy	Nagarkurnool	Mahabubnagar	M Grade-3	60,793	
58	Nagar Kurnool	Nagar Kurnnol	Mahabubnagar	M Grade-3	55,911	
59	Parigi	Vikarabad	Rangareddy	M Grade-3	40,451	
60	Neredcherla	Suryapet	Nalgonda	M Grade-3	35,879	
61	Luxettipet	Mancherial	Adilabad	M Grade-3	36,132	
62	Aiza	Jogulamba Gadwal	Mahabubnagar	M Grade-3	31,342	4.97
63	Gajwel	Siddipet	Medak	M Grade-3	58,154	
64	Chennur	Mancherial	Adilabad	M Grade-3	31,663	
65	Asifabad	Komaram Bheem	Adilabad	M Grade-3	33,032	
67	Madhira	Khammam	Khammam	M Grade-3	37,124	
68	Dasnapur	Adilabad	Adilabad	CT		
69	Sarapaka	Bhadradri Kothagudem	Khammam	CT	31,356	
71	Husnabad	Siddipet	Karimnagar	M Grade-3	38,653	
72	Achampet	Nagarkurnool	Mahabubnagar	M Grade-3	36,197	
73	Thorur	Mahabubabad	Warangal	M Grade-3	39,975	
74	Utnoor	Adilabad	Adilabad	M Grade-3	26,187	
75	Bhoothpur	Mahabubnagar	Mahabubnagar	M Grade-3	27,096	

== See also ==
- List of cities in India by population
- List of Smart and Amrut Cities in Telangana
- List of urban agglomerations in Telangana
