= Chinthalapalem, Suryapet district =

Chinthalapalem Chintalapalem
- Location in Telangana, India
- Coordinates: 16.5917°N 79.3852°E
- Country: India
- State: Telangana
- District: Suryapet

Population (2011)
  - Total: 6,597

Languages
  - Official: Telugu
- Time zone: UTC+5:30 (Indian Standard Time)
- PIN: 508218
- Telephone code: 08683
- Vehicle registration: TS 29

Chinthalapalem is a village in Suryapet district of Telangana, India. It is located in Mallareddygudem mandal of Kodad revenue division.
