= Chilkur mandal =

Chilkur mandal చిలుకూరు మండలం
- Mandal
- Location in Telangana, India
- Coordinates: 16°57′40″N 79°54′45″E
- Country: India
- State: Telangana
- District: Suryapet
- Headquarters: Chilkur

Population (2011)
  - Total: 37,770

Languages
  - Official: Telugu
- Time zone: UTC+5:30 (IST)
- PIN: 508206
- Vehicle registration: TS 29

Chilkur mandal is one of the 23 mandals in Suryapet district of the Indian state of Telangana. It is under the administration of Kodad revenue division with its headquarters at Chilkur. The mandal is bounded by Kodad mandal to the east, Huzurnagar mandal to the south, Munagala mandal to the north.

== Demographics ==
Chilkur mandal has a population of 37,770 living in 8,970 houses. Males are 19,126 and females are 18,644. Seetharampuram is the smallest village, and Chilkur is the biggest village in the mandal. Being a very small village in Chilkur mandal, Seetharampuram produced successful leaders like Ganna Appaiah garu and Ganna Chandrashekhar garu. Had 92% literacy. And also won "Aadarsha Gramam" award in 2010.

== Villages ==
As of 2011 census of India, the mandal has 4 settlements. The settlements in the mandal are listed below:

1. Chilkur (CT) †
2. Bethavole
3. Kondapuram
4. Paleannaram
5. Seetharamapuram

Notes
(†) Mandal headquarter
