= Motamarri =

- village
- Location within Telangana Location within India
- Coordinates: 16.96355°N 80.3271°E
- Country: India
- State: Telangana
- Region: Telangana
- District: Khammam
- Elevation: 40 m (130 ft)

Population (2011)
  - Total: 3,200

Languages
  - Official: Telugu
- Time zone: UTC+5:30 (IST)
- PIN: 507204
- Vehicle registration: TS04

Motamarri is a village in Khammam district of the Indian state of Telangana. It is located in Bonakal mandal, on the bank of the Wyra River.
