= Kodad =

Kodad Kodada
- Town
- Location in Telangana, India Kodad (India)
- Coordinates: 16°59′52″N 79°57′55″E
- Country: India
- State: Telangana
- District: Suryapet
- Established: 2011
- Founder: Babu Arunmuchi

Government
  - Type: Municipal council
  - Body: Kodad Municipality
  - Municipal Commissioner: Amarender Reddy
  - Chairman: Samineni Prameela

Area
  - Total: 31.19 km^{2} (12.04 sq mi)
- Elevation: 114 m (374 ft)

Population (2011)
  - Total: 65,234
  - Rank: 28th in Telangana
  - Density: 2,092/km^{2} (5,417/sq mi)

Languages
  - Official: Telugu
- Time zone: UTC+5:30 (IST)
- PIN: 508 206
- Telephone code: +91–8683
- Vehicle registration: TS-29
- Literacy: 74.12%
- MLA: N Padmavathi Reddy
- Website: Kodada Municipality

Kodad, also commonly called as Kodada, is the 2nd largest town in Suryapet district of the Indian state of Telangana. It is a municipality and the mandal headquarters of Kodad mandal in Kodad revenue division. It lies on the National Highway 65 between Hyderabad and Vijayawada. It is 44 km away from the district headquarters Suryapet.

== Climate ==
Kodad summer highest day temperature is in between 35 °C to 48 °C . Average temperatures of January is 24 °C, February is 26 °C, March is 29 °C, April is 33 °C, May is 36 °C .

== Transport ==
TGSRTC operates several buses from Kodad Bus stand to Suryapet,Hyderabad, Khammam, Nalgonda, Miryalaguda, Vijayawada, Jaggaiahpet and Huzurnagar

== Demographics ==
According to Census of India, 2011, population of Kodad town is 65,234 of which 32,010 are male and 33,224 are female. The literacy rate of the town is 96.7%. Sex ratio is 1060 females to 1000 males. Child sex ratio is 1100 girls to 1000 boys.

Kodad Mandal has a population of 134,130, of which 66,604 are male and 67,526 are female. The literacy rate is 94.33%.

== Governance ==
=== Civic administration ===
Kodad Municipality is the civic administrative body of the town which was constituted in the year 2011. It is spread over an area of 31.90 km^{2} (12.32 mi^{2}) with 30 wards. The present municipal commissioner is L.Balojinaik and the chairman is Samineni Prameela.

=== Politics ===
Kodad town under Kodad mandal falls under Kodad (Assembly constituency) of Telangana Legislative Assembly. N Padmavathi Reddy is the present MLA of the constituency from Indian National Congress.

== See also ==
- Suryapet
- Huzurnagar
