= N. Uttam Kumar Reddy =

Indian politician

Nalamada Uttam Kumar Reddy
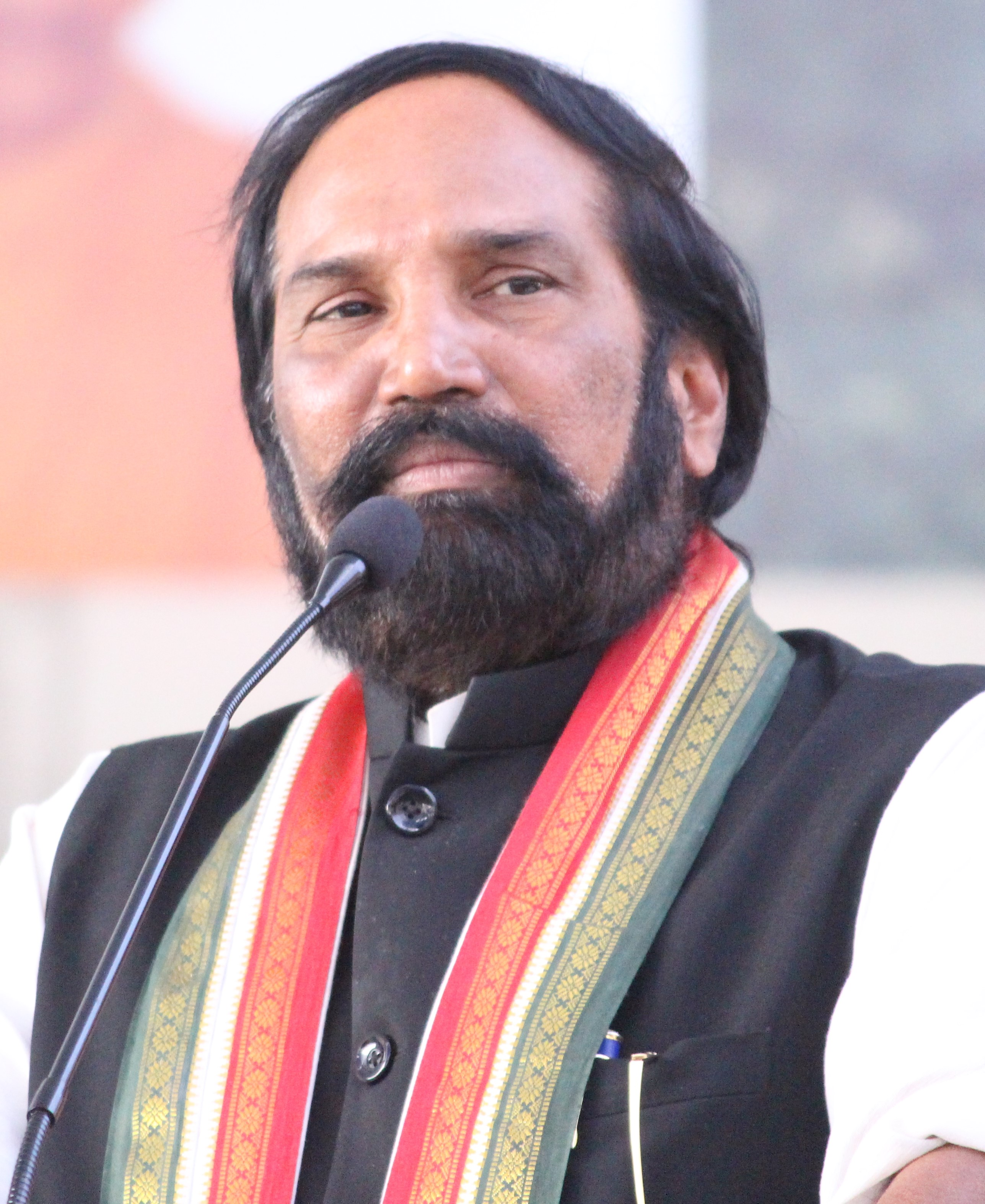
- Uttam Kumar Reddy in 2017

Minister of Irrigation, Food & Civil Supplies Government of Telangana
- Incumbent
- Assumed office 7 December 2023
- Governor: Tamilisai Soundararajan (2023-2024); C.P. Radhakrishnan (Additional charge) (2024); Jishnu Dev Varma (2024-2026); Shiv Pratap Shukla ( 2026–present)
- Chief Minister: Anumula Revanth Reddy
- Preceded by: Singireddy Niranjan Reddy; Gangula Kamalakar

Member of Parliament, Lok Sabha
- In office 6 June 2019 – 6 December 2023
- Preceded by: Gutha Sukender Reddy
- Succeeded by: Kunduru Raghuveera Reddy
- Constituency: Nalgonda, Telangana

2nd President of the Telangana Pradesh Congress Committee
- In office 2 March 2015 – 4 December 2020
- AICC President: Sonia Gandhi; Rahul Gandhi; Sonia Gandhi
- Preceded by: Ponnala Lakshmaiah
- Succeeded by: Revanth Reddy

Member of Telangana Legislative Assembly
- Incumbent
- Assumed office 9 December 2023
- Preceded by: Shanampudi Saidireddy
- Constituency: Huzurnagar
- In office 2 June 2014 – 5 June 2019
- Preceded by: Telangana Assembly created
- Succeeded by: Shanampudi Saidireddy
- Constituency: Huzurnagar

Minister of Housing and Cooperative Societies Government of Andhra Pradesh
- In office 25 May 2009 – 1 March 2014
- Governor: N. D. Tiwari; E. S. L. Narasimhan
- Chief Minister: Y. S. Rajasekhara Reddy; Konijeti Rosaiah; Nallari Kiran Kumar Reddy
- Preceded by: Botsa Satyanarayana
- Succeeded by: Allola Indrakaran Reddy

Member of Andhra Pradesh Legislative Assembly
- In office 16 May 2009 – 16 May 2014
- Preceded by: Constituency Established
- Succeeded by: Telangana Assembly Created
- Constituency: Huzurnagar
- In office 6 October 1999 – 16 May 2009
- Preceded by: Venepalli Chander Rao
- Succeeded by: Venepalli Chander Rao
- Constituency: Kodad

Personal details
- Born: Nalamada Uttam Kumar Reddy; 20 June 1962 (age 64) Suryapet, Andhra Pradesh (present-day Suryapet district, Telangana), India
- Party: Indian National Congress
- Spouse: N. Padmavathi Reddy
- Occupation: Politician
- Website: Official website

Military service
- Allegiance: India
- Branch/service: Indian Air Force
- Years of service: 1982–1991
- Rank: Flight Lieutenant
- Unit: President's Secretariat

Nalamada Uttam Kumar Reddy (born 20 June 1962) is a politician and former Indian Air Force pilot from the Indian state of Telangana. He was a Member of Parliament (MP) for the Nalgonda constituency. He served as Member of the Legislative Assembly (MLA) from Kodad between 1999 and 2009 and from Huzurnagar between 2009 and 2019. He served as the president of Telangana Pradesh Congress Committee from February 2015 until June 2021. He served as the Minister of Housing, Weaker Section Housing Programmes in N. Kiran Kumar Reddy's ministry.

== Early life ==
Uttam Kumar Reddy was born on 20 June 1962 in Nalgonda district, Andhra Pradesh to Purushottam Reddy and Usha Devi. He is a graduate in B.Sc. He is a former fighter pilot in the Indian Air Force. He flew the MiG 21 and MiG 23 in front line fighter squadrons. He served as the Controller of Security, Protocol, Administration, Foreign trips of President at Rashtrapati Bhavan.

== Personal life ==
Uttam Kumar Reddy is married to N. Padmavathi Reddy. The couple has no children.

== Political career ==
Uttam Kumar Reddy is a five-time MLA from Congress. He won the 1999 elections from Kodad constituency. He won from the same constituency in 2004 elections. In 2009, he shifted to Huzurnagar constituency and won the 2009, 2014 elections. After the formation of Telangana, he contested and won the 2018 elections from Huzurnagar. In the 2019 general elections, he contested and won as an MP from Nalgonda constituency. After winning as an MP, he resigned as an MLA from Huzurnagar that he won in 2018, with effect from 5 June. He served as the Minister of Housing, Weaker Sections Housing Programmes in N. Kiran Kumar Reddy's ministry.

He represented the Telangana region in an all party meeting held by the then Union Home Minister P. Chidambaram in January 2011 to discuss the Srikrishna Committee report.

He served as the official president of Telangana Pradesh Congress Committee (TPCC) from March 2015 until June 2021. After the defeat of Congress party in 2020 GHMC elections, he resigned as the TPCC president. However, the party continued with him until he was replaced by Revanth Reddy in June 2021.

In 2023 Assembly Elections he contested from Huzurnagar and won with a majority of 44888 votes on BRS candidate Shanampudi Saidireddy. He took oath as minister at L B Stadium in Hyderabad on 7 December 2023 and later he was assigned Irrigation and Food & Civil Supplies portfolios on 9 December 2023 in Revanth Reddy Ministry.

== Election statistics ==
	Year	Contested For	Party	Constituency	Opponent	Votes	Majority	Result	Reference
1	1994	MLA	Indian National Congress	Kodada	Chander Rao Venepally (TDP)	62,499 - 71,648	-9,149	Lost	
2	1999	MLA	Indian National Congress	Kodada	Chander Rao Venepally (TDP)	66,187 - 59,508	+7,309	Won	
3	2004	MLA	Indian National Congress	Kodada	Chander Rao Venepally (TDP)	88,178 - 64,391	+23,787	Won	
4	2009	MLA	Indian National Congress	Huzurnagar	Guntakandla Jagadish Reddy (TRS)	80,835 - 51,641	+29,194	Won	
5	2014	MLA	Indian National Congress	Huzurnagar	Kasoiu Shankaramma (TRS)	69,879 - 45,955	+23,924	Won	
6	2018	MLA	Indian National Congress	Huzurnagar	Shanampudi Saidireddy (TRS)	92,996 - 85,530	+7,466	Won	
7	2019	MP	Indian National Congress	Nalgonda	Vemireddy Narasimha Reddy (TRS)	5,26,028 - 5,00,346	+25,682	Won	
8	2023	MLA	Indian National Congress	Huzurnagar	Shanampudi Saidireddy (BRS)	1,16,707 - 71,819	+44,888	Won	

== Other works ==
Uttam Kumar Reddy played the role of a chief minister in the movie Terror (2016).
