= Ananthagiri, Suryapet district =

Ananthagiri
- Mandal Revenue
- Location in Ananthagiri, Suryapet, Telangana, India
- Coordinates: 17°03′16.8″N 79°59′20.8″E
- Country: India
- State: Telangana
- District: Suryapet

Government
  - Type: trs

Population
  - Total: 6,003

Languages
  - Official: Telugu
- Time zone: UTC+5:30 (IST)
- PIN: 508 206
- Telephone code: +91–8683
- Vehicle registration: TS-29
- Sarpanch: Venepally Sarojini

Ananthagiri is a thesildar in Kodad revenue division in the Suryapet district of Telangana, South India. Ananthagiri is also called has Hanumantha-Giri and later on people spell it has ananthagiri. Because, all say that there are more than 100 Lord Hanuman vigrahas around and nearby villages. The language spoken here is Telugu. It was the biggest Gram panchayat in Ananthagiri Mandal. It is a Village with great natural resources and high population density. NH-65 is the nearest highway which passes through the nearest town Kodad which is located at a distance of 7 km from Kodad.

== Demographics ==
As of 2011 census of India, Ananthagiri Village has total 3632 families residing. Ananthagiri village has population of 13738 of which 6940 are males while 6798 are females as per Population Census 2011.

Ananthagiri village population of children with age 0-6 is 1458 which makes up 10.61% of total population of village. The literacy rate of the village is 61.06%. In Ananthagiri Male literacy stands at 71.92% while female literacy rate was 50.09%.

Schedule Tribe (ST) constitutes 23.29% while Schedule Caste (SC) were 22.07% of total population in Anantha Giri village.

Particulars	Total	Male	Female
Total No. of Houses	3,632	-	-
Population	13,738	6,940	6,798
Child (0–6)	1,458	771	687
Schedule Caste	3,032	1,502	1,530
Schedule Tribe	3,199	1,656	1,543
Literacy	61.06 %	71.92 %	50.09 %
Total Workers	7,152	3,834	3,318
Main Worker	7,009	0	0
Marginal Worker	143	0	0

== Education ==
It is the major educational destination in the region. There is 1 engineering college named Anurag Group of Institutions located 1 km near this village and 2 Government schools in Ananthagiri.

=== Engineering College in Ananthagri ===
click the details to see about Anurag Engineering College

http://anurag.ac.in/

== Politics ==
Parliamentary Constituency- Nalgonda
Member of Parliament- N Uttham Kumar Reddy.
The current MLA of Kodad is Bollam mallaiah yadav. The current Sarpanch of Ananthagiri is Venepally Venkateshwara Rao.

Term	NAME	Party affiliation
Present (2019-)	Bollam mallaiah yadav	Telangana rashtra samithi
2014–2019	Nalamada Utham Padmavati Reddy	Indian National Congress
2009–2014	V Chandar Rao	Telugu Desam Party
2004–2009	Nalamada Uttam Kumar Reddy	Indian National Congress
1999–2004	Nalamada Uttam Kumar Reddy	Indian National Congress
1994–1999	V Chandar Rao	Telugu Desam Party
1989–1994	V Chandar Rao	Telugu Desam Party
1985–1989	V Chandar Rao	Telugu Desam Party
1983–1985	Veerapalli Laxminarayana Rao	Independent
1978–1983	Akkiraju Vasudeva Rao	JNP

== Places of worship ==
- Sri Sitha Rama Swamy Temple
- Shivalayam Temple
- Hanuman Temple
- Laxmi Narasimha Swamy Temple

== Weather and Climate ==
It is too Hot in summer. Highest day temperature is in between 35 °C to 48 °C . Average temperatures of January is 24 °C, February is 26 °C, March is 29 °C, April is 33 °C, May is 36 °C .
