= Dameracherla =

Damarcherla
- Village
- Location in Telangana, India Damarcherla (India)
- Coordinates: 16°43′37″N 79°38′13″E
- Country: India
- State: Telangana
- District: Nalgonda

Languages
  - Official: Telugu
- Time zone: UTC+5:30 (IST)
- PIN: 508355
- Vehicle registration: TS
- Climate: hot (Köppen)
- Website: telangana.gov.in

Dameracherla, alternatively spelled Damaracherla or Damercherla, is a village in Nalgonda district, Telangana, India. It is the head of the mandal of Damaracherla. The local language is Telugu. There are approximately 12,710 people living in the village.
