= Mellachervu =

- Village
- Location in Telangana, India Mellachervu (India)
- Coordinates: 16.81732°N 79.93309°E
- Country: India
- State: Telangana
- District: Suryapet

Area
  - Total: 57.97 km^{2} (22.38 sq mi)

Population (2011)
  - Total: 18,550
  - Density: 320.0/km^{2} (828.8/sq mi)

Languages
  - Official: Telugu
- Time zone: UTC+5:30 (IST)
- PIN: 508246
- Vehicle registration: TS-29

Mellacheruvu is a village in Suryapet district of the Indian state of Telangana. It is located in Mellachervu mandal of Kodad revenue division..It is about 64km from the district headquarters Suryapet.

It is the location of Sri Shambhu Lingeswara Temple.

At a distance of less than 1 km from Mellacheruvu Railway Station, 64 km from Suryapet, 99 km from Nalgonda and 200 km from Hyderabad, Sri Shambhu Lingeswara Temple is located at Mellacheruvu in Suryapet district of Telangana.

Sri Shambhu Lingeswara Temple is one of the most celebrated temples in Suryapet district. The presiding deity the temple of is Lord Shiva in the divine form of Sambhu Lingeswara Swamy. Lord Shiva here is believed to be self incarnated. The temple is believed to be at least thousand years old making it one of the ancient temples dedicated to Lord Shiva in the state. The temple architecture reflects the glory of Kakatiya dynasty. A notable feature of the temple is that on top of the Shivalingam there is a circular hole about 2 inches (5 cm) and water keeps flowing through the hole
