= Dachepalle =

- Town
- Interactive map of Dachepalle
- Location in Palnadu, Andhra Pradesh, India
- Coordinates: 16.6°N 79.7333°E
- Country: India
- State: Andhra Pradesh
- District: Palnadu
- Mandal: Dachepalle ( DCPL )

Government
  - Type: Municipality
  - Body: Dachepalle Nagar Panchayat

Area
  - Total: 3,358 ha (8,300 acres)

Population (2011)
  - Total: 37,000(Dachepalle Urban & Rural 2,011 census)
  - Density: 1,100/km^{2} (2,900/sq mi)

Languages
  - Official: Telugu
- Time zone: UTC+5:30 (IST)
- PIN: 522414
- Area code: +91–8649
- Vehicle registration: AP

Dachepalle town is the Municipality in Palnadu District of the Indian State of Andhra Pradesh. Dachepalle is the second lime city of India.This place is surrounded by good limestone resource.

Dachepalle also calls DCPL. Dachepalle is the headquarters of Dachepalle Mandal.Yes it is

== Geography ==
Dachepalle is situated at 16.6°N 79.7333°E. It is spread over an area of 3,358 ha (8,300 acres). Naguleru stream is the source of water for the villages.

== Governance ==
Dachepalle municipality is the local government. It is divided into wards and each ward is represented by a corporator.

== Education ==
As per the school information report for the academic year 2018–19, the village has a total of 16 schools. These schools include one KGBV, one model, 4 private, 7 MPP and three other type of schools.
