= N. Padmavathi Reddy =

Indian politician

Nalamada Padmavathi Reddy
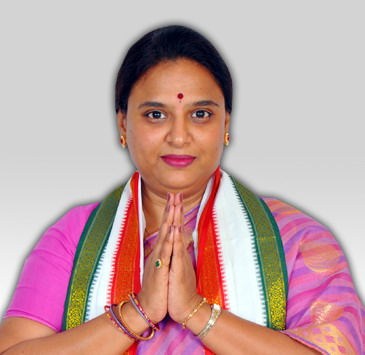

Member of Telangana Legislative Assembly
- Incumbent
- Assumed office 7 December 2023
- Preceded by: Bollam Mallaiah Yadav
- Constituency: Kodad
- In office 2 June 2014 – 11 December 2018
- Preceded by: Venepalli chander Rao
- Succeeded by: Bollam Mallaiah Yadav
- Constituency: Kodad

Personal details
- Born: 17 June 1967 (age 59) Hyderabad, Andhra Pradesh, (present-day Telangana) India
- Party: Indian National Congress
- Spouse: Nalamada Uttam Kumar Reddy
- Occupation: Politician

Nalamada Padmavathi Reddy is an Indian politician from Telangana. She was MLA of Kodadaa Assembly constituency. She belongs to Indian National Congress.

== Early life and education ==
She is a graduate in Architecture and was a student of Rishi Valley School and JNTU-Hyderabad, she also practised interior designing in Bangalore for a few years.

== Political career ==
Padmavathi was the first woman contestant from Kodad Assembly constituency. In 2014 Telangana Assembly Elections she was elected as MLA for the first time by defeating nearest rival by 1/2 vote.

== Personal life ==
She is married to Nalamada Uttam Kumar Reddy, who is the former president of Telangana Pradesh Congress Committee and Minister of Telangana.

== Electoral history ==
Election results
Year	Office	Constituency	Candidate	Party	Votes	%	Opponent	Opponent party	Votes	%	Result	Ref
2023	MLA	Kodad	Padmavathi Reddy Nalamada	Indian National Congress	1,25,783	60.19	Bollam Mallaiah Yadav	Telangana Rashtra Samithi	67,611	32.35	Won	
2018	MLA	Kodad	Padmavathi Reddy Nalamada	Indian National Congress	88,359	46	Bollam Mallaiah Yadav	Telangana Rashtra Samithi	89,115	46	Lost	
2014	MLA	Kodad	Padmavathi Reddy Nalamada	Indian National Congress	81,966	–	Bollam Mallaiah Yadav	Telugu Desam Party	68,592	–	Won	
