= List of cities in India by area =

This list is about the area of largest cities in India. The cities are ranked by the area governed by local political bodies such as municipal corporations. For the list of largest metropolitan areas, see list of metropolitan areas in India..

Bengaluru (Bangalore) is not in this list because there are five different municipal corporations in Bengaluru city. Since 1 May 2025 the Greater Bengaluru Authority has power over the municipal corporations in Bengaluru; their chairman is the chief minister of the Greater Bengaluru Authority; the mayor of Bengaluru is appointed by the Greater Bengaluru Authority.

This list is only for areas within municipal corporations which have an area of more than 400 km^{2}.

Rank	City	State / UT	Area (km^{2})	Area governed by	Ref
1	Delhi	Delhi	1484	Municipal Corporation of Delhi	
2	Ayodhya	Uttar Pradesh	872.81	Ayodhya Municipal Corporation	
3	Hyderabad	Telangana	689	Greater Hyderabad Municipal Corporation	
4	Malkajgiri	Telangana	685	Malkajgiri Municipal Corporation	
5	Visakhapatnam	Andhra Pradesh	681.96	Greater Visakhapatnam Municipal Corporation	
6	Cyberabad	Telangana	680	Cyberabad Municipal Corporation	
7	Lucknow	Uttar Pradesh	631	Lucknow Municipal Corporation	
8	Indore	Madhya Pradesh	530	Indore Municipal Corporation	
9	Pune	Maharashtra	526	Pune Municipal Corporation	
10	Ahmedabad	Gujarat	505	Amdavad Municipal Corporation	
11	Jaipur	Rajasthan	484.64	Jaipur Municipal Corporation	
12	Bhopal	Madhya Pradesh	463	Bhopal Municipal Corporation	
13	Surat	Gujarat	461.60	Surat Municipal Corporation	
14	Meerut	Uttar Pradesh	450	Meerut Municipal Corporation	
15	Mumbai	Maharashtra	440	Brihanmumbai Municipal Corporation	
16	Chennai	Tamil Nadu	426	Greater Chennai Corporation	
17	Warangal	Telangana	407.77	Greater Warangal Municipal Corporation	

== See also ==
- List of cities in India by population
