= Nadigudem =

- Village
- Location in Telangana, India Nadigudem (India)
- Coordinates: 17.0600°N 79.3°E
- Country: India
- State: Telangana
- District: Suryapet

Area
  - Total: 9.89 km^{2} (3.82 sq mi)
- Elevation: 17.07 m (56.0 ft)

Population (2011)
  - Total: 4,831
  - Density: 488/km^{2} (1,270/sq mi)

Languages
  - Official: Telugu
- Time zone: UTC+5:30 (IST)
- PIN: 508234
- Telephone code: +91–8683
- Vehicle registration: TS 29
- Website: telangana.gov.in

Nadigudem is a village in Suryapet district, of the Indian state of Telangana. It is located in Nadigudem mandal of Kodad revenue division.
