= Mattampally mandal =

Mattampally mandal మఠంపల్లి మండలం
- Mandal
- Location in Telangana, India
- Coordinates: 16.855805°N 79.893723°E
- Country: India
- State: Telangana
- District: Suryapet
- Headquarters: Mattampally

Population (2011)
  - Total: 41,857

Languages
  - Official: Telugu
- Time zone: UTC+5:30 (IST)
- PIN: 508204
- Vehicle registration: TS 29

Mattampally mandal is one of the 23 mandals in Suryapet district of the Indian state of Telangana. It is under the administration of Huzurnagar revenue division with its headquarters at Mattampally. It is bounded by Mellachervu mandal towards East, Huzurnagar mandal towards North, Garidepally mandal towards west, Guntur district of Andhra Pradesh towards South.

== Villages ==
As of 2011 census of India, the mandal has 10 settlements. The settlements in the mandal are listed below:

1. Mattampally (CT)
2. Peddaveedu
3. Choutapally
4. Alipuram
5. Yatavakilla
6. Chennaipalem
7. Vardapuram
8. Mattapalli
9. Gundlapalli
10. Raghunathapalem

Notes
() Mandal headquarter
