= Palakeedu =

- Country: India
- State: Telangana
- District: Suryapet

Population (2011)
  - Total: 3,039

Languages
  - Official: Telugu
- Time zone: UTC+5:30 (Indian Standard Time)
- PIN: 508218
- Telephone code: 08683
- Vehicle registration: TS-29

Palakeedu is a village in Suryapet district of Telangana, India. It is located in Palakeedu mandal of Suryapet revenue division. It is about 48 km from the district headquarters Suryapet.
