= Kodad revenue division =

Coordinates: 17.1415°N 79.6236°E

Kodad revenue division, కోదాడ రెవిన్యూ విభాగం
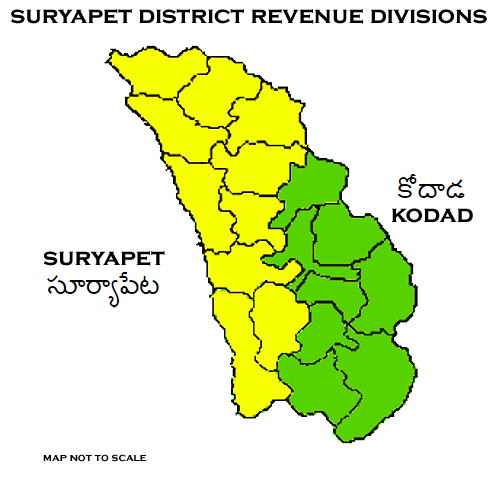
- Kodad revenue division in green
- Country: India
- State: Telangana
- District: Suryapet

Kodad revenue division (or Kodad division) is an administrative division in the Suryapet district of the Indian state of Telangana. It is one of the 3 revenue divisions in the district which consists of 5 mandals under its administration. Kodad is the divisional headquarters of the division.

== Administration ==
The mandals in the division are:

Mandals	Chilkur, Munagala, Nadigudem, Kodad, Ananthagiri

== See also ==
- List of revenue divisions in Telangana
- List of mandals in Telangana
