= Huzurnagar =

- Town
- Location in Telangana, India Huzurnagar (India)
- Coordinates: 16°54′N 79°53′E
- Country: India
- State: Telangana
- District: Suryapet

Area
  - Total: 42.13 km^{2} (16.27 sq mi)

Population (2011)
  - Total: 35,850
  - Rank: 51st in Telangana
  - Density: 850.9/km^{2} (2,204/sq mi)

Languages
  - Official: Telugu
- Time zone: UTC+5:30 (IST)
- PIN: 508204
- Vehicle registration: TS 29
- Vidhan Sabha constituency Huzurnagar: Huzurnagar
- Climate: hot (Köppen)
- Website: telangana.gov.in

Huzurnagar is the third largest town in the Suryapet district of the Indian state of Telangana. Huzurnagar is a Municipality and the Mandal Headquarters of Huzurnagar Mandal in Huzurnagar Revenue Division. It is 54 km (34 mi) far away from the district Headquarters Suryapet.
