= Suryapet =

Suryapet Suryapeta
- City
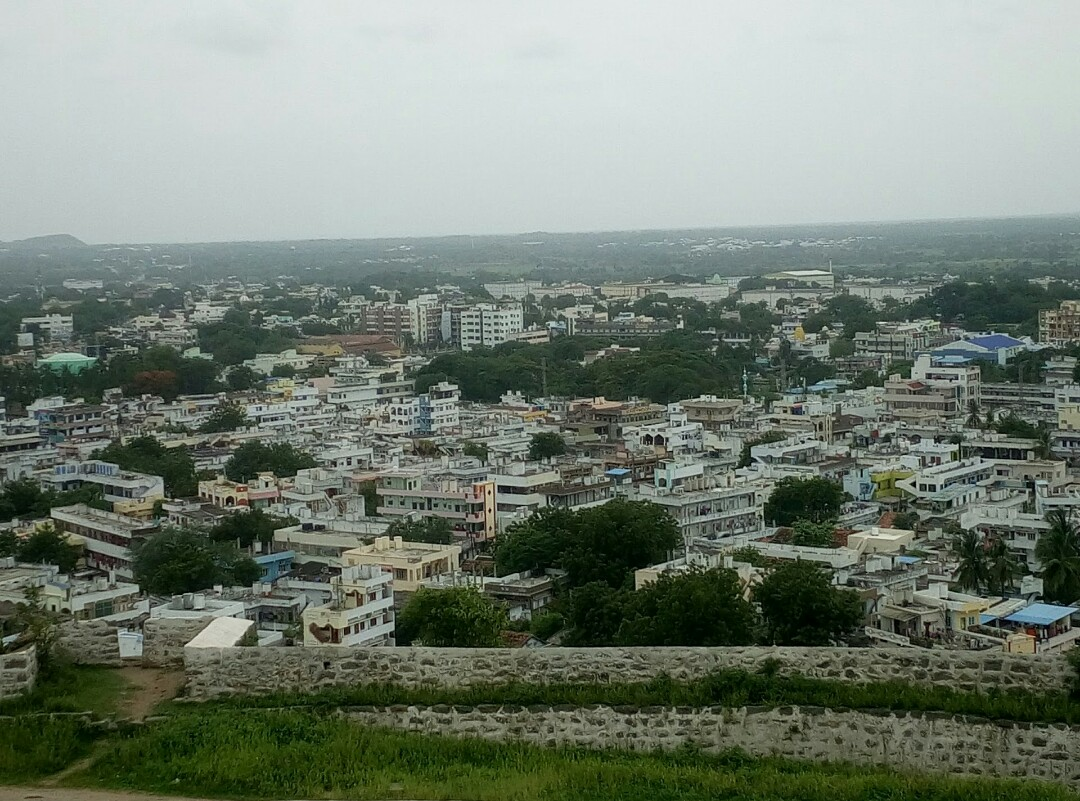
- Nickname: Sun city
- Location in Telangana, India Suryapet (India)
- Coordinates: 17.1415°N 79.6236°E
- Country: India
- State: Telangana
- District: Suryapet

Government
  - Type: Municipal
  - Body: Suryapet Municipality
  - MLA: Guntakandla Jagadish Reddy (BRS)

Area
  - Total: 35 km^{2} (14 sq mi)
- Elevation: 178 m (584 ft)

Population (2024)
  - Total: 171,356
  - Rank: 10th (in Telangana); 306th (in India)
  - Density: 4,900/km^{2} (13,000/sq mi)

Languages
  - Official: Telugu, Urdu
- Time zone: UTC+5:30 (IST)
- PIN: 508 213
- Telephone code: 91-8684
- Vehicle registration: TG–29
- Sex ratio: 1000:923 ♂/♀
- HDI Category: medium
- Literacy: 84.88%
- Website: suryapetmunicipality.telangana.gov.in

Suryapet, also natively spelt as Suryapeta, is a city in the Indian state of Telangana. It is a municipality and the headquarters of its eponymous district.In 2015, the Government of India placed Suryapet under the Atal Mission for Rejuvenation and Urban Transformation scheme. Suryapet has been awarded the "Cleanest city" in South India by the Ministry of Urban development in Swachh Survekshan 2017. It is also known as "Gateway of Telangana". It is located about 134 kilometres (83 mi) east of the state capital, Hyderabad and also it is located about 138 kilometres (86 mi) West of Vijayawada.

== Etymology ==
Previously Suryapet is known as Bhanupuri, which is modernized into the name Suryapet. People also call the town as Suryapeta.

== Geography ==
Suryapet or Suriapet is located at 17.1500°N 79.6167°E. It has an area of 54 square kilometres (21 sq mi).

== History ==
Telugu Cholas, Chalukyas, Kakatiyas, Recherla Reddis and Nizam dynasties ruled this region.

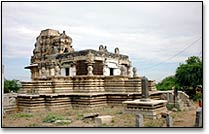
Pillalamarri, one of the oldest Hindu Temples in Suryapet

== Climate ==
Under the Köppen climate classification, Suryapet experiences Tropical Wet and Dry Climate. The annual mean temperature is 36 °C. Monthly mean temperatures are 19–40 °C (66–104 °F). Summers (March–June) are hot and humid, with temperatures in the low 30s Celsius; during dry spells, maximum temperatures often exceed 45 °C in May and June. Winter lasts for only about 2 1/2 months, with seasonal lows dipping to 9–11 °C (48–52 °F) in December and January. May is the hottest month, with daily temperatures ranging from 35–43 °C (95–109 °F); January, the coldest month, has temperatures varying from 15–23 °C (59–73 °F). The highest recorded temperature is 51.02 °C (123.84 °F), and the lowest is 9 °C (48 °F).

Rains brought by the south-west summer monsoon lash Suryapet between June and September, supplying it with most of its annual rainfall of 821.0 mm. The highest total monthly rainfall, 180.0 mm, occurs in July. There is also significant rainfall in October and November from northeast monsoons. Winter season starts in December and lasts through February. Temperatures range from a minimum of 18 °C and can reach 33 °C.

Climate data for Suryapet
Month	Jan	Feb	Mar	Apr	May	Jun	Jul	Aug	Sep	Oct	Nov	Dec	Year
Mean daily maximum °C (°F)	32 (90)	32 (90)	35 (95)	38 (100)	39 (102)	34 (93)	31 (88)	29 (84)	31 (88)	31 (88)	29 (84)	28 (82)	32 (90)
Mean daily minimum °C (°F)	16 (61)	19 (66)	22 (72)	25 (77)	26 (79)	24 (75)	23 (73)	22 (72)	22 (72)	21 (70)	18 (64)	16 (61)	21 (70)
Average precipitation mm (inches)	3 (0.1)	18 (0.7)	23 (0.9)	28 (1.1)	39 (1.5)	150 (5.9)	180 (7.1)	144 (5.7)	125 (4.9)	69 (2.7)	39 (1.5)	3 (0.1)	821 (32.2)
Source: MyWeather

== Demographics ==
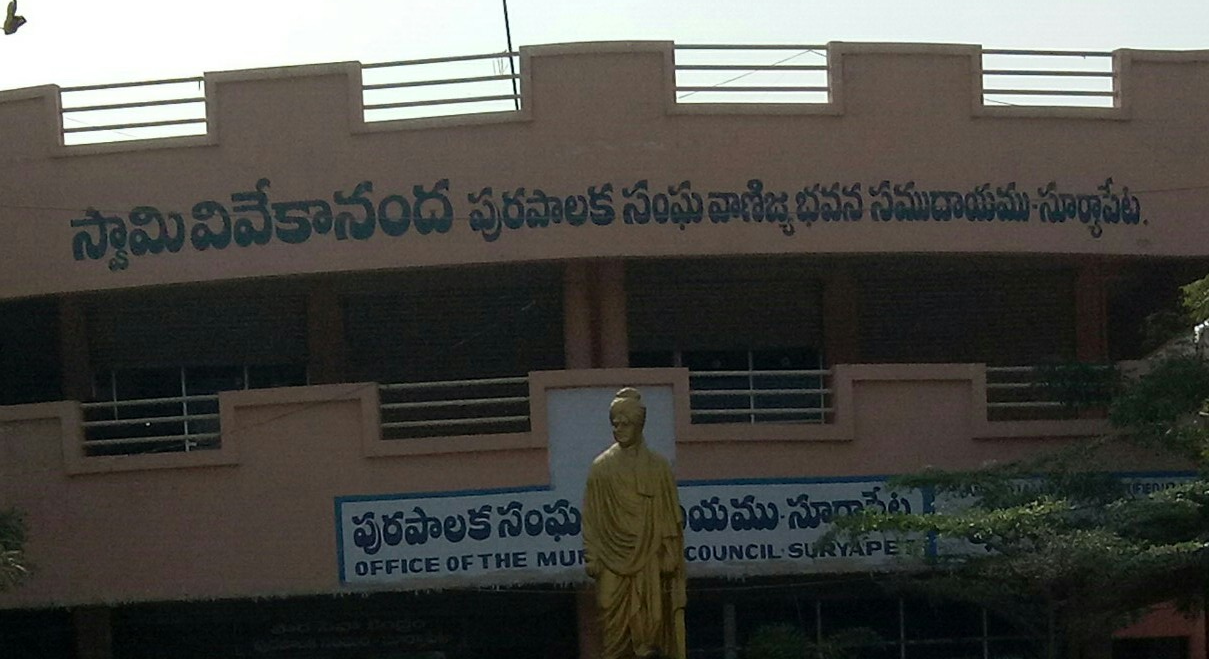
Suryapet Municipality

Historical population
Year	Pop.	±%
1991	60,630	—
2001	94,256	+55.5%
2011	115,250	+22.3%

Religions in Suryapet
Religion	Percentage
Hindu	90%
Muslim	8%
Christian	2%

As of 2011 India census, Suryapet had an urban metropolitan population of 115,250 Suryapet is the most populous city in Suryapet district. Apart from the city population, it has a floating population of approximately 10,000 from the neighbouring villages daily. Males constitute 52% of the population and females 48%. Suryapet has an average literacy rate of 84.88%, higher than the national average of 74.04.%: male literacy is 91.18%, and female literacy is 78.74%. In Suryapet, 11% of the population is under 6 years of age.

== Governance ==
=== Civic administration ===
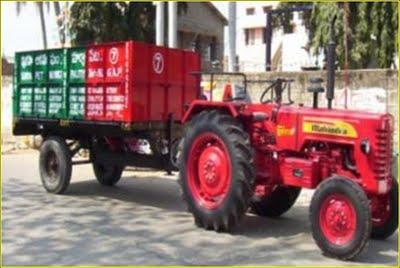
Suryapet Municipality tractor collecting garbage

Suryapet municipality was constituted in 1952. It was upgraded to Grade–II in 1984, Grade–I on 7 November 1998. The area of the municipality is spread over an area of 54.00 km^{2} (20.85 sq mi) with 48 wards. The present municipal commissioner is Ch. Hanmantha Reddy and the chairman is Morishetti Niveditha.

The city also serves as the headquarters of Suryapet mandal in the Suryapet revenue division.

== Awards ==
Suryapet Municipality became the first waste-compliant city of India in 2003. It had won Green Leaf Award for Best Garbage Disposal in 2007. Suryapet is the first municipality in the country to receive the (ISO 14001-2004 certificate. Suryapet Municipality has won the HUDCO Award under environmental management category.

== Economy ==
In 2023 there was an Integrated Market inaugurated in Suryapet as well as an IT Hub.

== Education ==
The primary and secondary school education is imparted by government, aided and private schools, under the School Education Department of the state.

The medium of instruction followed by schools are English, Telugu and Urdu.

Government Medical College at Suryapet, a first after the formation of new districts in the State

== Transport ==
=== Highways ===
- NH 65-Pune-Solapur-Hyderabad-Suryapet-Vijayawada
- NH 365B-Suryapet-Jangaon-Siddipet-Siricilla $Connecting different district Hq's of the state
- NH 365BB-Suryapet-Khammam-Rajahmundry
- State Highway 16 (Suryapet-Siddipet)

=== Bus ===
Suryapet Hi-tech Bus station is the fifth largest bus station in Telangana after Hyderabad, Khammam, Karimnagar and Nizamabad bus stations.

There are three bus stations in Suryapet.

- High-Tech Bus station (20 Platforms)

~TSRTC Suryapet Depot operates only Hyderabad (Deluxe and Express buses from this High tech bus stand)...Other TSRTC and APSRTC Out depots travels through this bus stand are Hyderabad, Bengaluru, Vijayawada, Khammam, Bhadrachalam, Kothagudem, Madhira, Manuguru, Sathupally, Ellandu, Rajahmundry and Kakinada.

- New bus station (10 Platforms)

~TSRTC Suryapet Depot operates buses from Suryapet New Bus stand to Hyderabad, Nalgonda, Khammam, Warangal(Hanmakonda), Karimnagar, Jangaon, Mahabubabad, Kodad, Tungaturthi, Tirumalagiri Neredcherla, Miryalagudem, Devarakonda, Nakrekal, Mothkur, Bhuvanagiri, Thorrur, Eturunagaram and Srisailam.

- Old bus station

=== Air ===
Rajiv Gandhi International Airport in Hyderabad is the nearest airport at a distance of 135 km by road. The other airport nearer to Suryapet is Vijayawada International Airport which is at a distance of 160 km by road.

=== Rail ===
Two new Semi-High speed corridors proposed to pass through Suryapet They are :

- Shamshabad-Suryapet-Visakhapatnam
- Kurnool-Suryapet-Visakhapatnam

At present there is no railway station in Suryapet. Nearest railway stations are :

- Miryalaguda- 38 km
- Nalgonda - 46 km
- Khammam - 64 km

== See also ==
- Suryapet (Assembly constituency)
- List of cities in Telangana by area
- List of cities in Telangana by population
- List of Smart and Amrut Cities in Telangana
- List of cities in India by area
