= Ramadasu =

Ramadasu could refer to:

- Bhadrachala Ramadasu, 17th century Indian composer and poet
- Ramadasu, a 1934 film produced by East India Film company
- Ramadasu, a 1934 film produced by Krishna Films
- Ramadasu, a 1964 film
- Sri Ramadasu, a 2006 film
