= Sita Ramachandraswamy Temple, Bhadrachalam =

Hindu temple of Rama in Telangana, India

Sri Sita Ramachandraswamy Temple
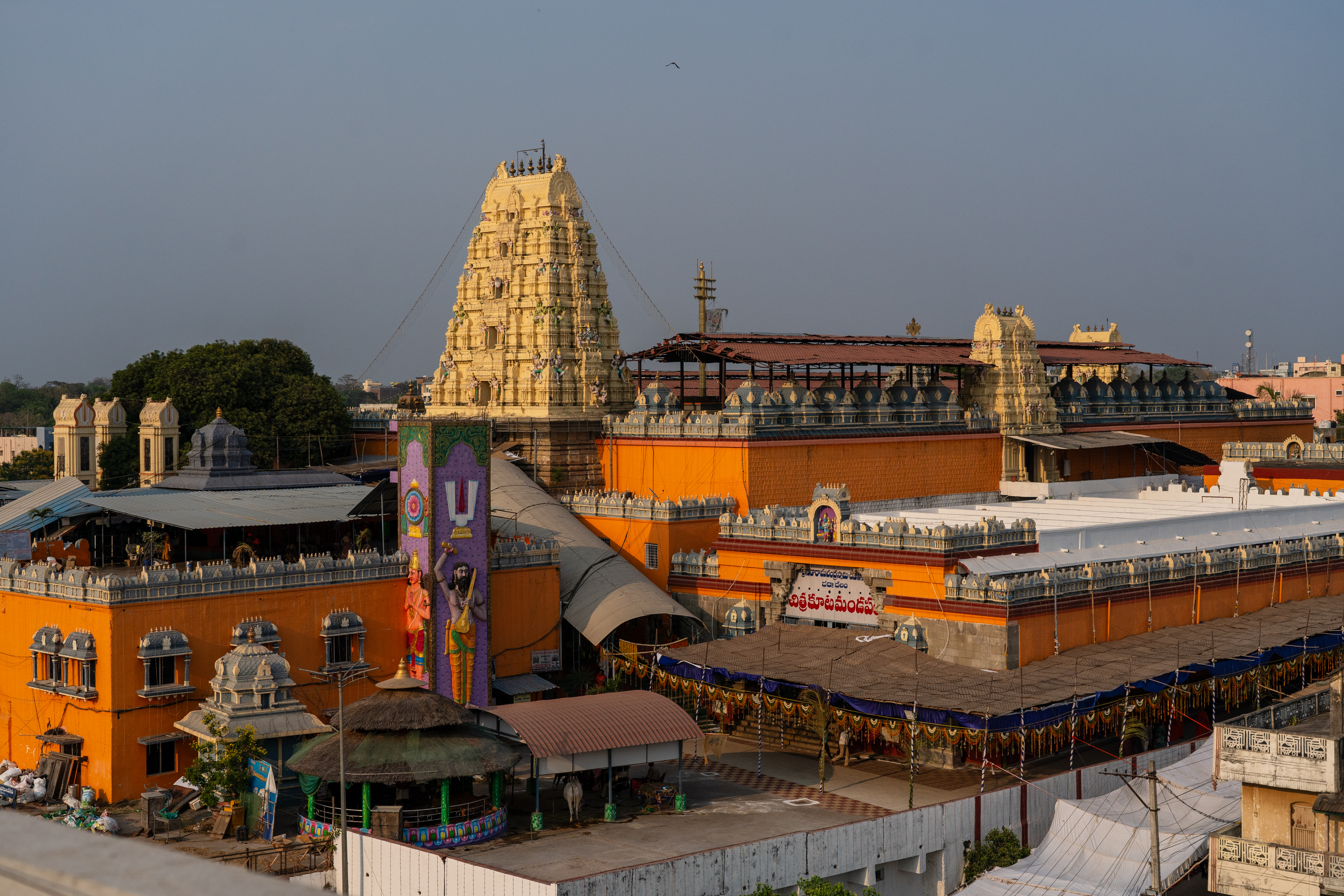

- Location in Telangana

Religion
- Affiliation: Hinduism
- District: Bhadradri Kothagudem district
- Deity: Rama, Sita
- Festivals: Vasantha Paksha Prayukta Srirama Navami Brahmotsavam; Vaikuntha Ekadashi; Vijayadashami

Location
- Location: Bhadrachalam
- State: Telangana
- Country: India
- Coordinates: 17°40′0.92″N 80°52′57.94″E

Architecture
- Creator: Kancherla Gopanna
- Completed: 17 century CE

Website
- https://bhadradritemple.telangana.gov.in/

The Sri Sita Ramachandraswamy Temple is a Hindu Temple dedicated to Rama, a prominent avatar of the god Vishnu. It is located on the banks of the Godavari River in the town of Bhadrachalam in east Telangana, India. Often simply referred to as Bhadrachalam or Bhadragiri, Bhadradri, the temple is considered one of the Divya Kshetrams of Godavari and is also revered as Dakshina Ayodhya.

The central icon features the four-armed Vaikuntha Rama, the form Vishnu appeared in to answer Bhadra'a prayers. Rama's consort Sita and brother Lakshmana form part of the central icon. By some accounts the Bhadrachalam temple was built, and other accounts repaired by the legendary Bhakti saint Kancherla Gopanna – also known as Bhadrachala Ramadasu – in the 17th century. Gopana was the revenue officer of Bhadrachalam under the reign of the last Sultan of Golconda, Abul Hasan Qutb Shah (Tana Shah). Gopana was accused and arrested of using funds meant for the Sultanate treasury to build the Sita Ramachandraswamy temple. He spent 12 years in jail, where he composed bhakti songs still sung at this temple. Before Golconda Sultanate collapsed during Aurangzeb's expansion of the Mughal control of the Deccan region, Gopana was released by Sultan Tana Shah when Lord Rama himself appeared with Lakshmana to pay the gold coins Sultan demanded for Gopana's release. Gopana then continued to compose poems dedicated to Rama in this temple.

After Gopanna, Tumu Lakshmi Narasimha Dasu and Varada Ramadasu looked after the temple's rituals. Bhadrachalam follows the Vaishnavite Pancharatra Agama tradition, and its system of worship is modelled on that of the Ranganathaswamy temple in Srirangam. The temple has four entrances; the Rajagopuram is located at the northern entrance, which is called the Vaikuntha Dwaram. The temple houses a number of sub-shrines and a few mandapams.

Bhadrachalam is notable for its principal deity Rama. Gopanna used Bhadrachalam as a centre of the Bhajan tradition to spread awareness of the Vaishnavite tradition. The annual Brahmotsavam is the biggest festival celebrated in Bhadrachalam; the key event is the Sri Sitarama Thirukalyana Mahotsavam, or the marriage of Rama and Sita on the eve of Rama Navami. Other important festivals celebrated in Bhadrachalam are Vaikuntha Ekadashi, Vasanthotsavam, and Vijayadashami.

== Legends ==
The temple is one of several in India linked to the epic Ramayana legend about Bhadra. According to this legend, in the Treta Yuga, Rama (avatar of the god Vishnu), along with his consort Sita and brother Lakshmana, stayed in the Dandaka forest as a part of their fourteen-year exile. Due to Rama's grace, a stone turned into a human called Bhadra, who was considered the son of Mount Meru. Devoted to Rama, Bhadra later met the sage Narada, who initiated an upadesam (instruction) of the Rama Taraka mantra. Bhadra mediated and chanted the mantra on the banks of the Godavari River for several years. Pleased, Rama promised to return to meet Bhadra when he had found Sita, who had been abducted by the demon king Ravana. However, Rama failed to fulfill his promise in his lifetime.

Later, Vishnu was pleased with Bhadra's devotion. To fulfill the promise his Rama avatar had made, he appeared before Bhadra in the form of Rama. In a hurry, Vishnu forgot that Rama was a mortal with two arms and appeared with his four celestial arms. Rama in upper arms held a shankha (conch) and the Sudarshana Chakra (discus) and a bow and an arrow in his lower hands. Sita was seated on his left thigh and Lakshmana stood to his left. All three faced west towards the Godavari River. Rama held the conch in his right upper hand in contrast to Vishnu, with the intention of giving salvation to Bhadra. This Bhadra legend is the mythology behind Bhadrachalam as well as other Bhadra-prefixed locations and temples in India.

Some attribute the sanctum's statue with Rama with Sita seated in his lap and brother Lakshmana standing next to him to another local legend. This legend states that a tribal woman living in Bhadrareddypalem named Pokala Dhammakka found the central icon of Rama in an anthill. Pokala Dhammakka is also believed to be a descendant of Sabari. The story goes that deity was present in the jungle, and this was revealed to the pious Dhammakka in a dream. She went to the jungle location, dissolved the anthill using the water from the Godavari River and did puja to the deities. With the help of the villagers, Dhammakka constructed a mandapam (hall) and offered prayers to the deities.

== History ==
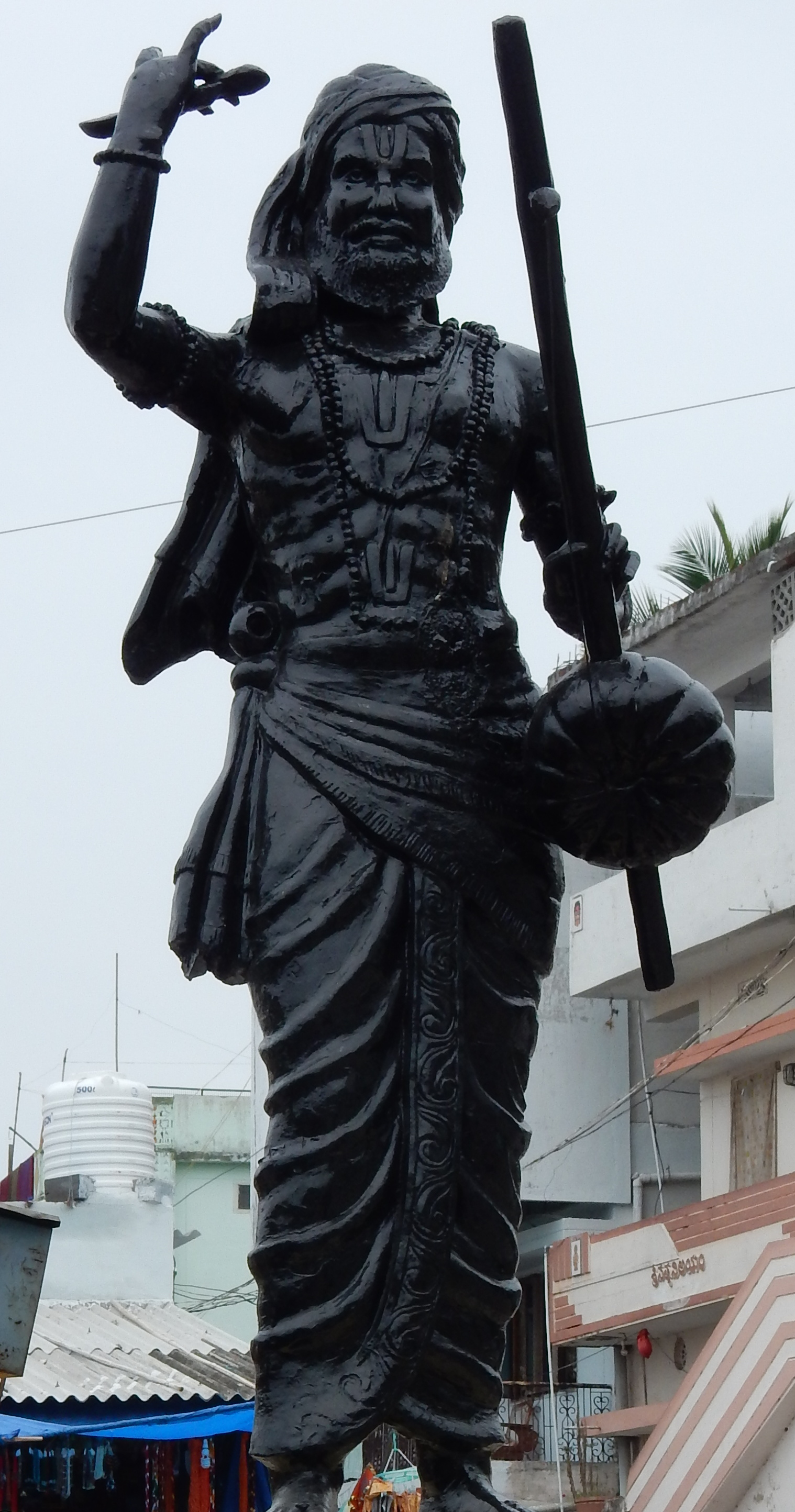
A statue of Bhadrachalam Ramadasu (Kancherla Gopanna) in Bhadrachalam

The history of the temple is closely linked to the history of Kancherla Gopanna. He was born in Nelakondapalli village of Telangana. His maternal uncle worked for Golconda Sultanate. As a famine swept through the region, the uncle appealed to the Sultan to give his nephew a job. Gopana was appointed as the tehsildar (revenue officer) of Bhadrachalam. During the reign of Abul Hasan Qutb Shah – the last Sultan of Golconda (1672-1686) – under his orders, Gopanna enforced the Jaziya religious tax, a penalty designed to force Hindus to adopt Islam. Gopanna received harsh criticism from the local Hindus for enforcing the tax. Dejected by numerous rebuffs, Gopanna decided to use a portion of the tax for the temple and face the consequences. According to one version, Gopana built the temple using the taxes he collected. In another version, observing the dilapidated state of the temple, Gopanna repaired the temple for Rama with those taxes, and tried to offset the spent taxes by raising donations.

The temple was completed in second half of the 17th century at a cost of nearly six lakh varahas. (Note: A varaha is a gold coin used as currency in the medieval period. The Vijayanagara Empire issued them first with the symbol of boar, which lent its name. The special ones issued by Krishnadevaraya bear the image of Venkateswara with a diameter of 18–20 millimetres and a thickness of 2 millimetres. It weighs 7.8 grams.)

After learning the truth, the Shah was enraged, and Gopanna was summoned to the court. Gopanna explained that he never intended to misuse the treasury funds and planned to reimburse using donations he expected to receive in the future. The Shah ordered his soldiers to hang Gopanna if the sum was not repaid within twelve years, and imprisoned him. On the last day of the twelfth year, According to one version of events at the end of the 12 year term, Rama and Lakshmana appeared in Shah's dream and repaid the entire sum in Rama madas (gold coins with Rama's inscriptions on them). When the Shah woke up, he saw real gold coins and released Gopanna. According to another version, the Shah also gave Gopanna a pension for life and donated the area around Bhadrachalam as an endowment to the temple. According to The Hindu, an Indian newspaper, some scholars dismissed the idea of Rama paying the money, saying that "Gopanna was imprisoned by his jealous enemies", and the Shah freed Gopanna after a fair inquiry, then sent him back to Bhadrachalam with due honors. All these stories lack historical evidence, because Gopanna's 12-year confinement in Golconda prison by the Shah lasted till mid 1680s, closely coinciding with the Shah's rule of 14 years and the fall of Golconda Sultanate. The last known Golconda documents from the Shah's era are from 1686, and over 1686–87, the forces of Mughal emperor Aurangzeb attacked Golconda over 8 months, fought with Shah's forces, then dismissed the Shah and imprisoned him in Aurangabad, as Aurangzeb sought to expand his control of the Deccan region.

According to another myth published in Indian newspapers and local publications, the 15th century Kabirdas – a Vaishnav saint – toured Telangana singing bhakti songs of Rama. The dedication and charity of the 17th-century Gopanna so impressed Kabir, that he gave him the title of Ramadas (Rama's servant).

According to the temple's history, after Gopana's death Tumu Lakshmi Narasimha Dasu of Guntur and his friend Varada Ramadasu of Kanchipuram offered prayers daily at Bhadrachalam and spent their life there. After Varada Ramadasu's death, Narasimha Dasu carried his corpse into the Godavari and died by drowning.

=== Modern era ===
The temple and the lands were administered by Hyderabad State. In 1860, though the surrounding lands were given to British, the temple was retained with the Hyderabad state in Warangal (later Khammam) districts. The lands, though under British rule, the rights of the lands were held with Palwancha samsthanam of Kingdom of Nizam. Later, the lands surrounding the temple were merged into Khammam district in 1959. The temple's maintenance and administration were undertaken by the endowment ministry of the Government of Andhra Pradesh in 1958. Repairs were made to the temple in 1960 under the supervision of the then-endowments minister Kalluri Chandramouli.

In August 1986 the temple faced a severe threat from flash floods in the Godavari River. The main streets and several structures, including cottages, were submerged in water for nearly five days. Many local people took shelter in the halls of the temple. The kalyana mandapam (marriage hall) was completely inundated except for its gopuram (temple tower). P. Seshacharyulu and other priests stayed in the temple and performed all the daily rituals without any interruption during the floods.

During the Telangana movement, both the states of Telangana and Andhra Pradesh claimed that the Bhadrachalam temple belongs to their respective regions. Telangana politicians and activists stood firm on their stance and stated that they would not let Bhadrachalam be separated from the state. Bhadrachalam was retained in Telangana, and after reorganisation of districts in October 2016, the temple became a part of Bhadradri Kothagudem district.

== The Temple ==
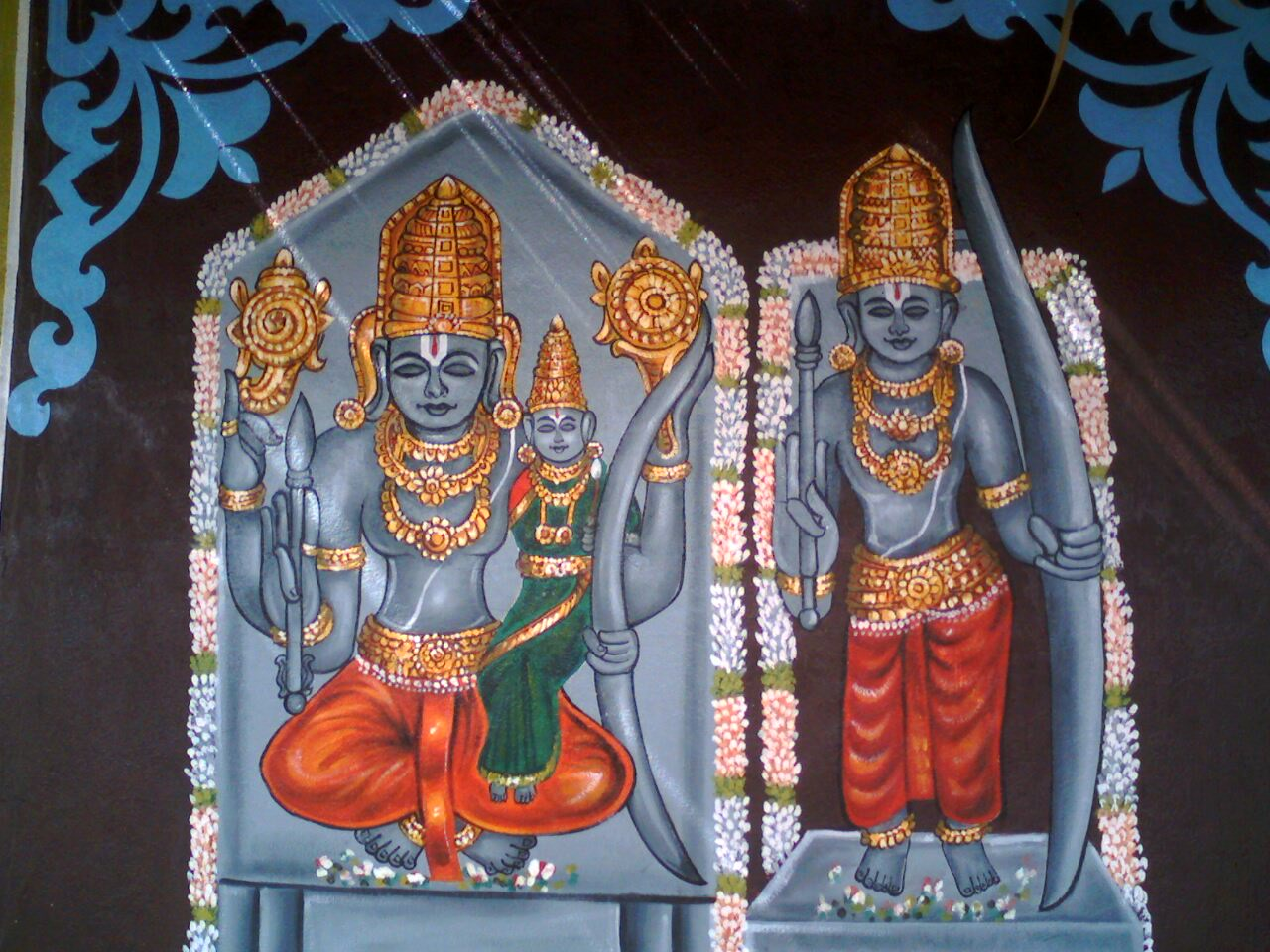
A painting of the temple's deities Rama, Sita, and Lakshmana in the Yogananda Narasimha temple, Bhadrachalam

The temple is divided into three parts. The first is believed to be the head of Bhadra, where a shrine is dedicated to him. Inside, on a rock structure, the supposed footprints of Rama can be seen. Thirunamam(a white clay) is applied to the rock so that the visitors can recognise it as Bhadra's head. The second part of the temple is the sanctum where the central icon resides on a place considered equivalent to Bhadra's heart. The third part is the Rajagopuram (main tower), which is located at Bhadra's feet.

The temple has four entrances; there are 50 steps to be climbed to reach the main entrance. In 1974, a huge door named the Vaikuntha Dwaram was built to ensure proper management of the visiting devotees. Directly opposite to the sanctum is a gold-plated dwajasthambam (flag post). It is made of panchaloha (a five-metal alloy), on which are carved images of Garuda, the vehicle of Vishnu. On the top of the vimana of the sanctum is an eight-faced Sudarshana Chakra with a thousand corners, that was engraved by Gopanna, who found it lying in the waters of the Godavari River. On the vimana, a miniature of the temple's deity can be seen. The entrance for devotees, who have purchased a special visit ticket, is towards the left of the sanctum. The regular visitors have to wait in a queue that leads straight into the sanctum. Housed in an area to the right of the sanctum are the festival icons of Rama, Sita, and Lakshmana, which are worshipped daily.

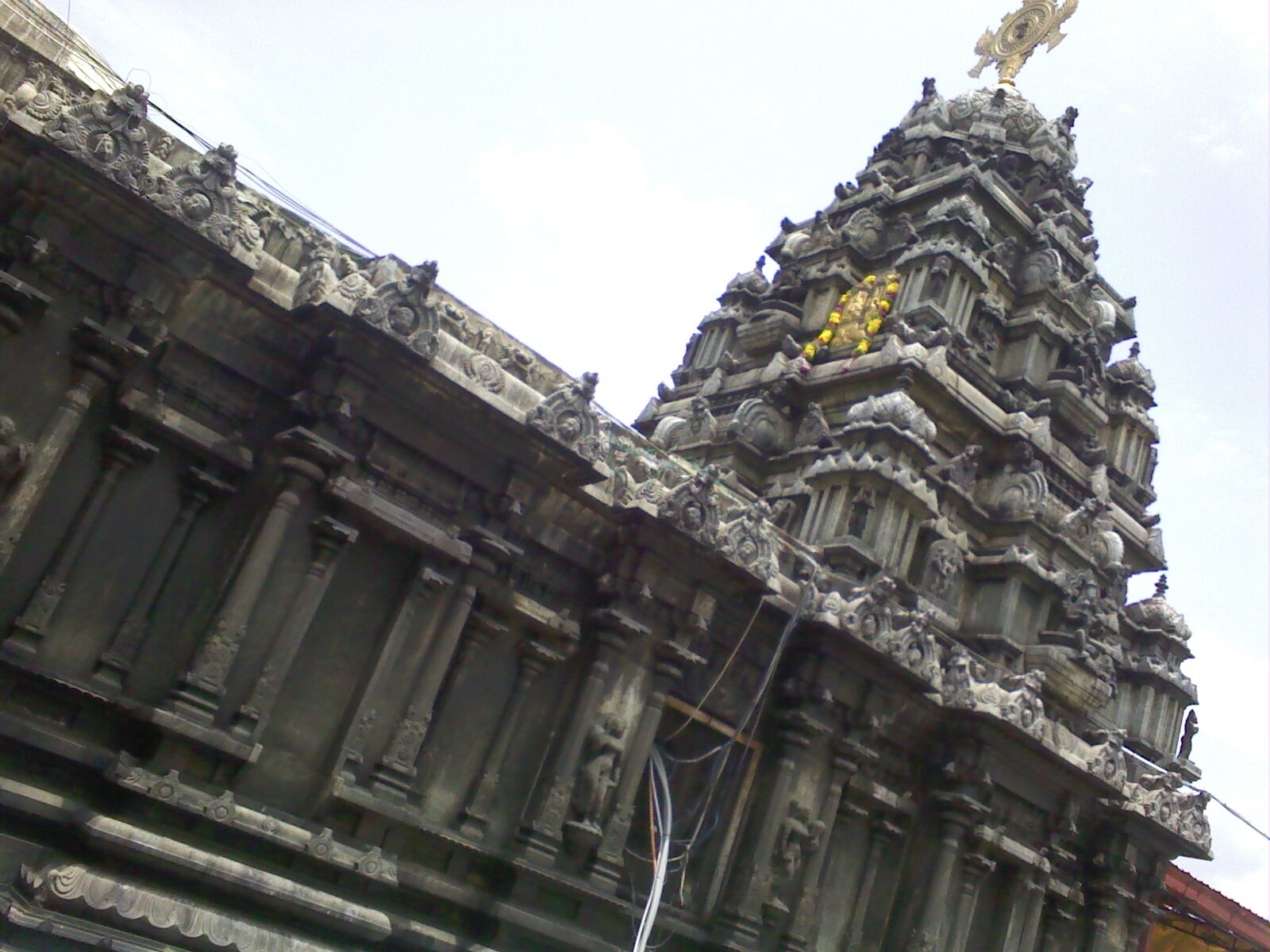
The central sanctum sanctorum of Bhadrachalam, with the Sudarshana Chakra at the top and the miniature of the temple's deity.

The central icon housed in the sanctum is considered Swayambhu (self-manifested). Rama is seated in a padmasana posture, with Sita seated on his lap. Rama's four hands hold the conch, disc, bow, and arrow. Lakshmana stands to his left.

On a taller hill, Gopanna installed and consecrated the icon of Ranganatha, a reclining form of Vishnu, which faces the south. The place is popularly known as Ranganayakula Gutta (hillock of Ranganatha). Opposite the Ranganatha sanctum is a temple dedicated to his consort Lakshmi Thayar. These two temples were included by Gopanna to follow the tradition of Srirangam Ranganathaswamy temple. The temple houses a number of other shrines. Hanuman has two shrines in the temple: the Abhayanjaneya temple at the river bank and the Dasanjaneya temple in the Thiruveedhi (divine passage) of Bhadrachalam. In the Rajaveedhi (royal passage) of the temple, a shrine of Govindaraja Swamy (a form of Vishnu) can be found where the festival icons of Bhadrachalam spend some time during the Thiruveedhi utsavam festival procession. On the way to the main temple from the river bank, a shrine is dedicated to Yogananda-Narasimha. The icon is believed to be Swayambhu and very powerful.

Next to the Lakshmi Thayar temple is the Rushya Mookham Exhibition centre. In the centre, the Rama mada coins given to the Shah, jewellery made by Gopanna for the deities, and other important items are housed. The jewellery includes the chintaku patakam (a necklace studded with rubies), kirithas (crowns), plaited decorations, and a mutyala haramu (chain of pearls). In the outer ambulatory passage of the temple, there is a hall called the Nithyakalyana mandapam or kalyana mandapam, intended for conducting the marriage festival of Rama and Sita. On the Ranganayakula Gutta is a temple dedicated to the god Shiva, who is worshipped as Ramalingeswaraswamy. Near the kalyana mandapam, there is a hermitage named Govindaswamy matham where many saints stayed in the past. A huge hall named Mithila Stadium was built facing the Vaikuntha Dwaram. Its construction was initiated by Jalagam Vengala Rao and was completed at a cost of ₹3.8 million. The icons worshipped by Narasimha Dasu are housed in the Ambasatram, which is located at the southern end of the temple. Here, food is served to the devotees visiting the temple.

== Religious practices ==
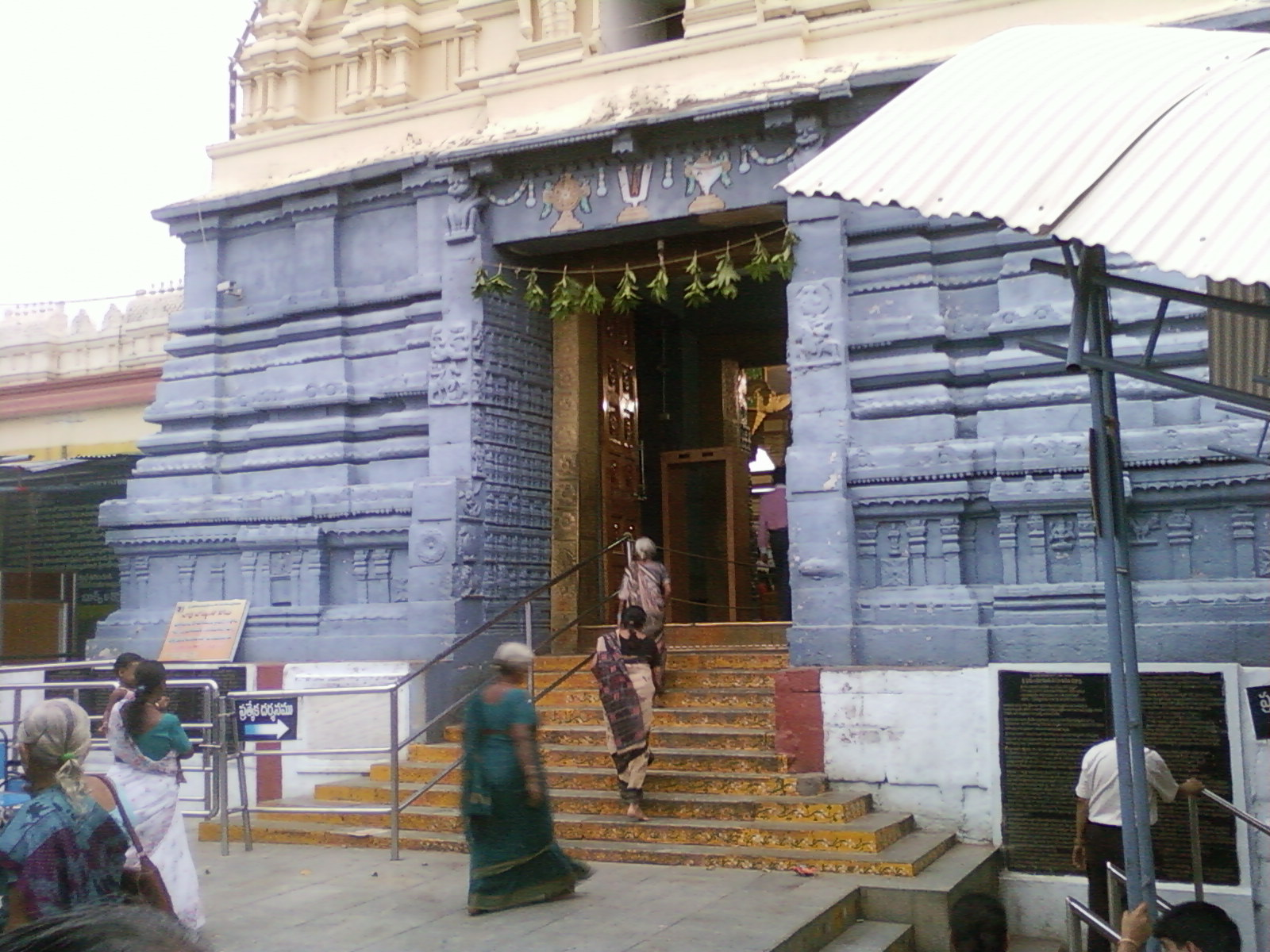
Bhadrachalam temple entrance

According to Ramayana and other sacred texts, Ranganatha was the Kuladevata (tutelary deity) of Rama's clan, the Ikshvaku dynasty. Hence, Gopanna wanted this temple to implement all the traditions and guidelines of the Srirangam temple dedicated to Ranganatha. For the same reason, he invited five families from Srirangam who knew the Pancharatra Agama traditions to Bhadrachalam. With their help, the system of worship followed in the Srirangam temple was implemented here. Narasimha Dasu later introduced the Dasavidhotsavams (ten kinds of rituals), including Nitya Kainkaryams (daily rituals), Vaarotsavams (weekly rituals), Pakshotsavams (fortnightly rituals), and Punarvasu utsavam (rituals on the Punarvasu day).

The suprabhata seva (pre-dawn ritual) begins early in the morning at 4:00 am, followed by providing Balabhoga (minor food offerings) from 5:30 to 7:00 am. From 8:30 to 11:30, the regular archana (prayer) activities are held. Rajabhogam (main food offering) is served to the deity from 11:30 am to 12:00 noon; then the temple remains closed until 3:00 pm. From 3:00, the archana rituals continue, after which darbar seva (the king's court ritual) is performed from 7:00 to 8:00 pm. After a break to offer food to the deity from 8:30 to 9:00 pm, the temple is closed after performance of the pavalimpu seva (the sleeping ritual). Abhisheka (anointment) in the main sanctum is performed only to Rama's feet on the rock structure in Bhadra's temple. This ritual is also performed to the deities in the Lakshmi, Anjaneya, and Yogananda Narasimha temple exclusively on every Friday, Tuesday, and Saturday, respectively. There are weekly, monthly, and fortnightly rituals performed in the temple apart from the annual ones. Kalyanam (marriage) and Thiruveedhi utsavam (procession festival) are performed at the Ranganayakula Gutta every year for its presiding deity Ranganatha.

== Festivals ==
=== Vaikuntha Ekadashi ===
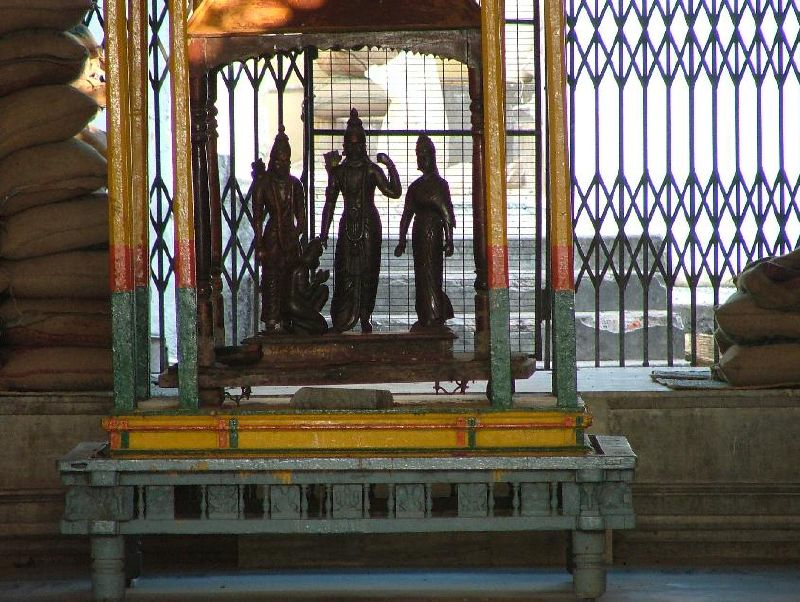
(left to right) The utsava idols of Hanuman, Lakshmana, Rama, and Sita in Bhadrachalam

The Vaikuntha Ekadashi celebrations are based on the traditions followed in Srirangam. As per the Bhadradri Kshetra Mahatyam (Importance of Bhadradri) in the Brahma Purana, devotees seeking the blessings of Vaikuntha Rama on the annual festival day of Vaikuntha Ekadashi shall be granted salvation. The Agama text named Paramapurusha Samhita states that the devotees must watch Vishnu seated on the procession vehicle of Garuda proceeding from the North gate to fulfill their wish of gaining salvation.

As a prelude to Vaikuntha Ekadashi, Teppotsavam (the float festival) is celebrated during which a swan-shaped boat named Hamsavahanam is utilised for the procession of the utsava icons on the waters of the Godavari River. Teppotsavam is held at night under the light of electrical lighting and fireworks. The boat makes five circular rounds in the water, and nearly 26 people accompany the icons in the procession. On the day of Vaikuntha Ekadashi, the utsava idols of Rama, Sita, and Lakshmana are seated on Garudavahanam, and devotees pass through the Vaikuntha Dwaram. Goda Kalyanam and Rathotsavam (the chariot festival) form the other main important activities of the 21-day-long celebrations; the latter coincides with the Makar Sankranti festival.

=== Vasanthotsavam ===
Vasanthotsavam (festival of spring) is celebrated to mark the commencement of the preparations for the annual Brahmotsavam (Grand celebration) festival. This festival coincides with Holi and involves the preparation of the mutyala talambralu (talambralu made of pearls and rice; talambralu is a mixture of rice and turmeric used in South-Indian marriage rituals). (Note: Talambralu is a mixture of rice grains mixed with saffron and turmeric that is used in the marriage rituals of a Telugu household. The bride and the bridegroom shower each other with this mixture while praying for happiness and contentment.) Natural pearls are mixed with rice grains, the husks of which have been removed with nails, and turmeric powder. This entire mixture is processed by hand. This mixture, with the addition of aromatic ingredients, is known as Goti talambralu (talamralu polished by nails).

The event begins with Vaishnava women gathering in the Chitrakoota mandapam hall in the temple's premises and participating in an initial prayer to the traditional grinding equipment. They powder the turmeric seeds using the traditional grinding equipment and use them in the preparation of the Goti talambralu. The icon of Rama is decorated using nine blocks of turmeric powder and other aromatic ingredients. The priests perform Maha Kumbhaprokshana (sanctification of the temple). The water used in the process, known as Vasantha theertham, is sprinkled on the devotees who then celebrate Holi. Dolotsavam (the swing ritual) is performed to conclude Vasanthotsavam by placing the festival icons in a golden cradle and singing lullabies.

=== Brahmotsavam ===
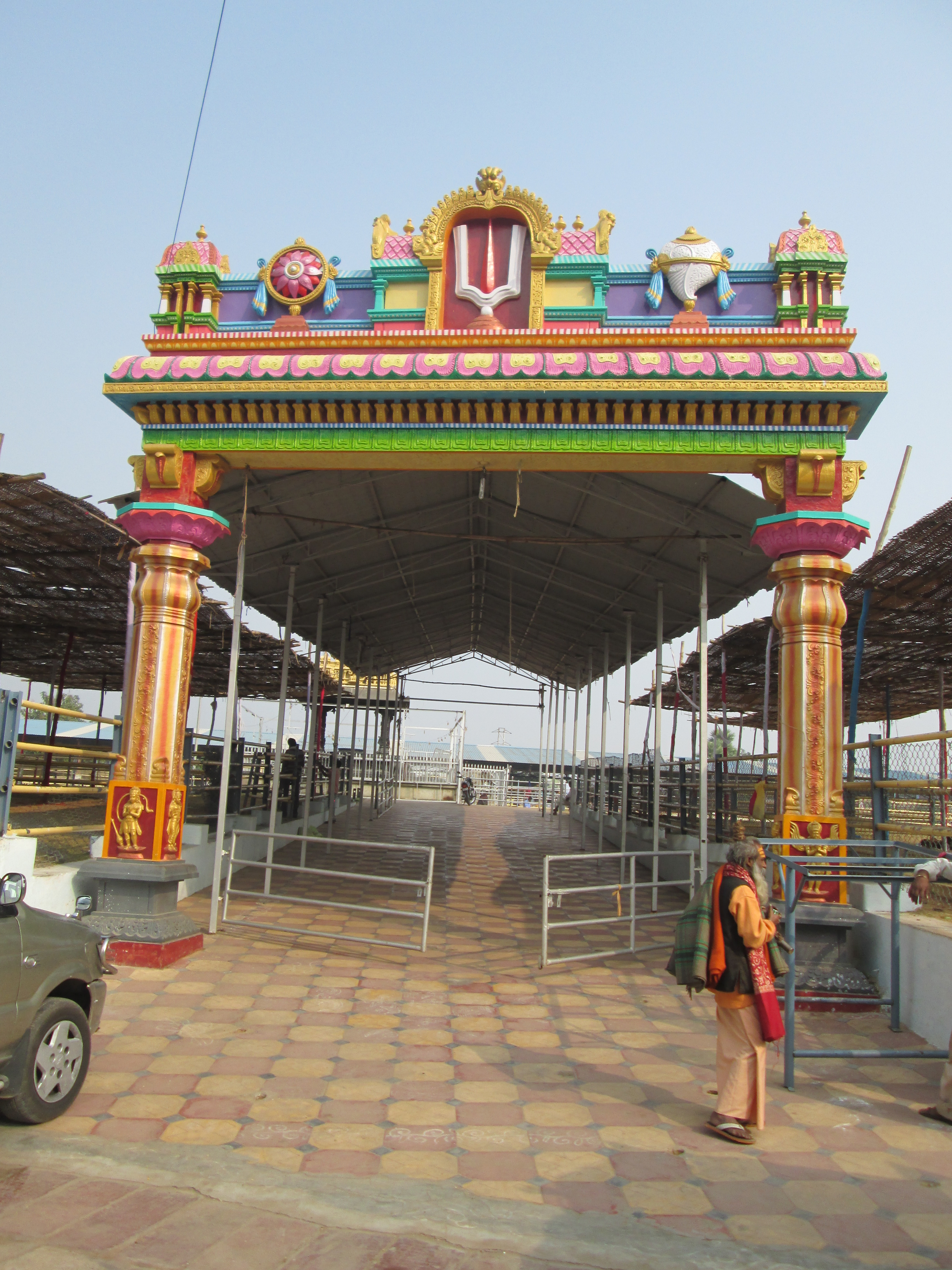
The entrance of Mithila Stadium, where the annual Sri Sitarama Thirukalyana Mahotsavam is celebrated

The chief temple festival is the twelve-day long annual Brahmotsavam festival (the Vasantha Paksha Prayukta Srirama Navami Brahmotsavam), celebrated during March—April. Rama Navami, the birthday of Rama, is the main event of the Brahmotsavam. According to the Pancharatra Agama rules, Rama's marriage with Sita is held on this day; the marriage is performed at a time that signifies the presence of the stars Punarvasu and Abhijit. This festival is formally referred to as Sri Sitarama Thirukalyana Mahotsavam.

Brahmotsavam is initiated by performing Visesha Snapanam (a special cleansing) of the festival icons followed by Ankurarpanam (the formal start), listening to the Panchangam dictation, and the Thiruveedhi utsavam. The Dwajapata Bhadraka Mandala Lekhanam, a flag made of white cloth with an image of Garuda, is prepared, and special prayers are performed. The Garuda image, whose eyes are covered with wax, has five colours in it. The flag is worshipped with hymns such as Garudanyasam and Garuda Dhyanam. After placing the flag at the feet of the temple's central icon, it is taken to the Vedi (fire altar) and placed on a heap of rice. The procedure is completed by performing Abhisheka (libation) to the flag with sixteen kalashas containing sacred water. This ritual is referred to as Garudadhivasam (invitating Garuda).

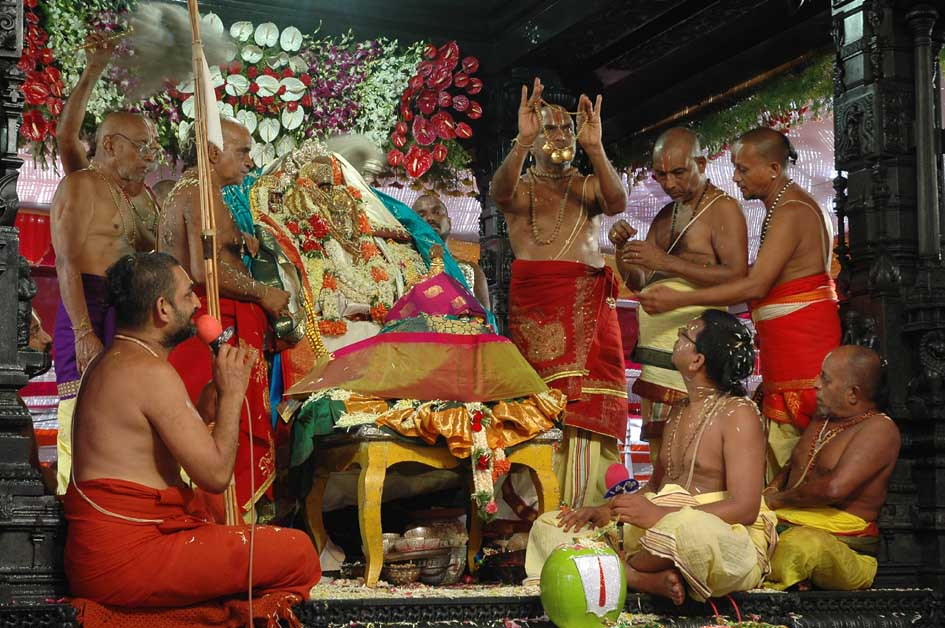
Sri Sitarama Thirukalyana Mahotsavam celebrations at Bhadrachalam in 2011. One of the priests holds the three-disc mangala sutra provided by Gopanna.

After Garudadhivasam, the priests perform Dwajarohanam (flag hoisting) and start a special fire ritual. Brahmotsavam continues with the Edurukolu (welcoming the bridegroom) event before proceeding to the marriage. The Shah, after releasing Gopanna from jail, started the tradition of sending pearls and silk robes as gifts to Rama and Sita on the eve of the marriage conducted in the temple. This tradition continued uninterrupted throughout the Qutb Shahi reign, and all succeeding governments. These pearls are used along with the Goti talambralu in the Thirukalyana Mahotsavam.

The mangala sutra necklace used in this marriage ceremony contains three coin-sized gold discs. According to Telugu tradition, one disc pertains to Dasharatha, Rama's father, and the second one to Janaka, Sita's father. The third one pertains to Gopanna, who considered Sita as his daughter. This three-disc mangala sutra provided by Gopanna is only available in Bhadrachalam and is used even today. After completion of the marriage ceremony, Mahapattabishekam (the coronation ceremony) and Teppotsavam are held. Brahmotsavam ends with the completion of Sripushpayagam (flower worship).

=== Vijayadashami ===
The ten-day Dussehra is one of the key festivals celebrated in Bhadrachalam. The Ramayana is read for ten days daily during the ritual of a yagna, which ends on the tenth day and is referred to as Vijayadashami. The rituals are performed in the Lakshmi Thayar temple according to the rules of the Pancharatra Agama. On Vijayadashami, the nijaroopa darshanam (true form darshan) of Lakshmi Thayar attracts thousands of devotees. In the morning, Abhisheka and Sahasranama archana (recital of a thousand attributes) are performed to Lakshmi Thayar.

The key events of the Dussehra celebrations are the marriage and coronation of Rama followed by special prayers to his weapons and the Shami tree (prosopis cineraria). After the completion of the yagna, Rama's idol is dressed like that of an emperor and is carried out in a procession on the vehicles of Gaja (elephant) and Aswa (horse). As a part of the weapon worship, Rama's conch, disc, bow, and mace are used. Arrows representing the powers of the vedic deities Indra, Yama, Varuna, and Kubera are also made a part of the worship. The event ends with the traditional Ramlila ceremony conducted at night.

=== Other festivals ===
The other prominent festivals celebrated at Bhadrachalam are Hanuman Jayanti, Sabari Smruti Yatra, and Dhammakka Seva Yatra. Hanuman Jayanti is celebrated at the Dasanjaneya temple, with leaf worship and Thiruveedhi utsavam being the main events. Devotees mark the conclusion of their Hanuman Deeksha by untying the Irumudi (sacred bundle) before Rama and offering it at the Dasanjaneya temple. For Sabari Smruti Yatra, members of local tribes sport distinctive headgear and clothing. They sing and dance to the drum beats and display their archery skills.

The main event of Dhammakka Seva Yatra is the marriage of Govindaraja Swamy and his consorts. Special performers among the members of tribes from 29 mandals around Bhadrachalam offer floral tributes to Dhammakka's statue. They offer talambralu to the deity in addition to flowers and fruits, and perform traditional dances. Apart from these, the jayanthi utsavam (birthday) of Gopanna and Narasimha Dasu are also celebrated annually.

== Religious significance ==
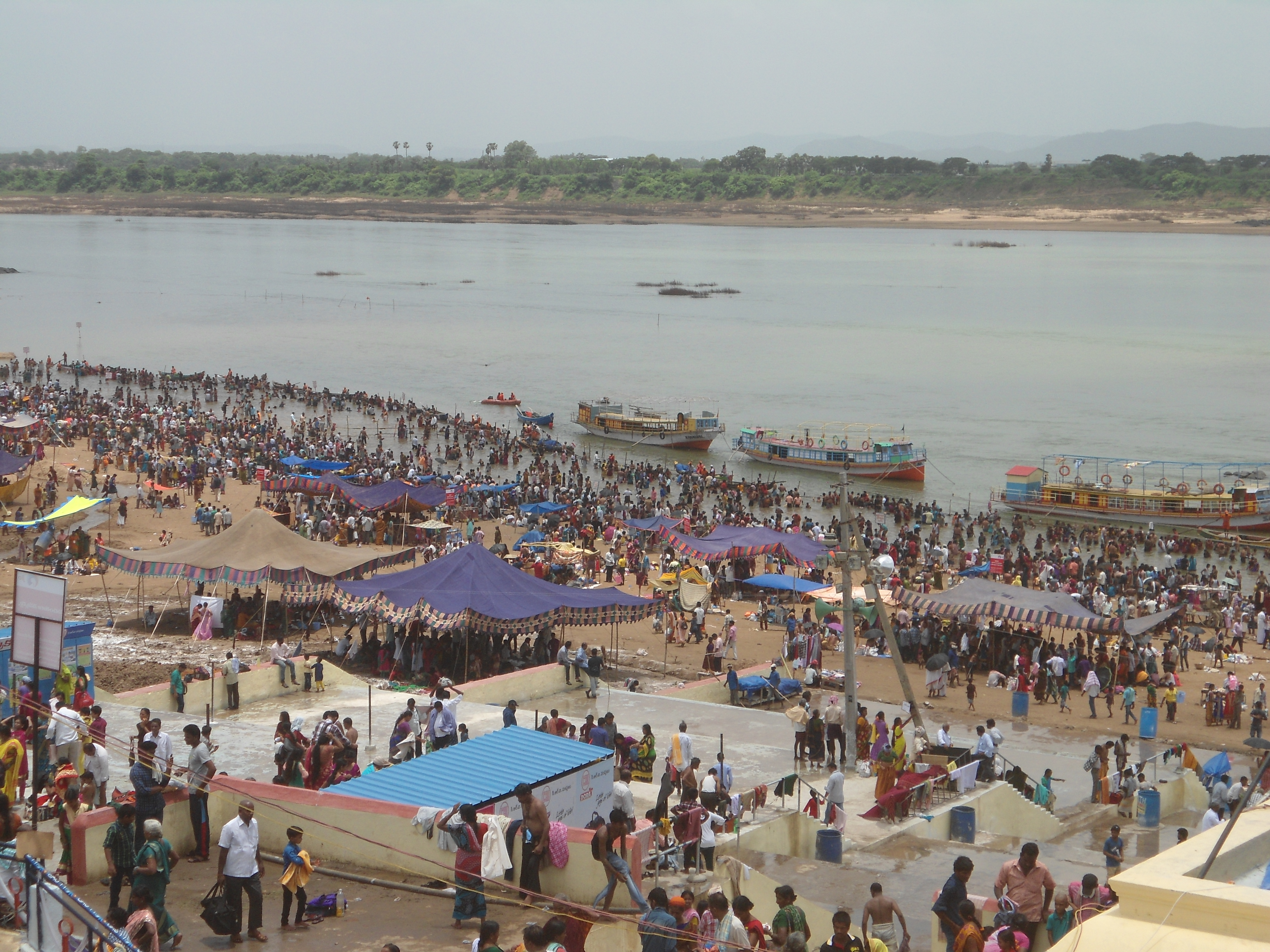
Maha Pushkaram at Bhadrachalam in 2015

Bhadrachalam is often referred to as Dakshina Ayodhya ("Southern Ayodhya"); Ayodhya being the capital of Rama. The iconography of the Vaikuntha Rama form of Rama, is unique and not found anywhere else in the country. The Brahma Purana makes special mention of the temple's significance and adds that Vaikuntha Rama is capable of imparting knowledge to those who worship him at Bhadrachalam. Bhadrachalam is considered as one of the Divya Kshetrams (special temples) that sit on the banks of the Godavari River. Hence, the river's Pushkaram and Maha Pushkaram are celebrated here along with others once every twelve years and 144 years, respectively. (Note: Pushkaram is a traditional 12-day Hindu festival focusing on ancestor worship. It is celebrated every 12 years at 12 Indian rivers when Brihaspati (the personification of Jupiter) enters Leo, the zodiac sign of Surya. Believers consider bathing in a river during Pushkaram auspicious.)

As per legend, when a Muslim saint Kabir who was also a devotee of Rama, was once denied entry into the temple by the priests. The images of the temple disappeared for the moment. Ramadas who was there pleaded with the priests to let the saint inside the temple, after which the icons appeared again.

Gopanna used Bhadrachalam as a centre of the Bhajan tradition to spread awareness of the Vaishnavite tradition. This eventually led to the increase in the number of Rama temples in the Telugu-speaking states across the years, especially in villages. Gopanna's songs inspired Tyagaraja, another ardent devotee of Rama who composed several songs in Indian carnatic music. Tyagaraja revered Gopanna as his "personal hero", and he composed several songs modelled on songs written by Gopanna in praise of Vaikuntha Rama. He later inspired Narasimha Dasu, who composed songs in praise of Rama during his stay at Bhadrachalam. It helped Narasimha Dasu gain recognition as a true follower of Gopanna. The annual tradition of giving pearls and silk robes to Rama on the day of his marriage celebrations has been replicated at many other smaller temples dedicated to the deity.

Bhadrachalam area also has several Hindu temples connected with Epic Ramayana.

== Bibliography ==
- Anantharaman, Ambujam (2006). Temples of South India. East-West Books (India) Ltd. ISBN 978-81-88661-42-8.
- Chaitanya Deva, Bigamudre (1995). Indian Music. Taylor & Francis. ISBN 978-81-224-0730-3.
- Glener, Doug; Komaragiri, Sarat (2002). Wisdom's Blossoms: Tales of the Saints of India. Shambhala Publications. ISBN 978-0-8348-2938-1.
- Reddy, Sunil (2011). Guruji: Teachings of a Hindu Saint. iUniverse. ISBN 978-1-4620-0921-3.
- Warrier, Shrikala (2014). Kamandalu: The Seven Sacred Rivers of Hinduism. Mayur University. ISBN 978-0-9535679-7-3.
