= Variar =

Hindu Ambalavasi caste in Kerala, India

Variyar (also written as Variar, Varyar, Warriar or Warrier) is a matrilineal Hindu Ambalavasi caste in Kerala, India, who have traditionally associated with temple services.

== Etymology and origin ==
The term Variyar has its origin in the Malayalam word 'Variyam' (Malayalam: വാരിയം /വാര്യം), which refers to a committee or a board. Variyam refers to an office of supervision. Thus variyar is a supervising officer or a member of a supervisory board or committee. The word is commonly used in the plural form as Variar (Vārian + -ar) to denote respect. The feminine equivalent of Variar is Vārassyar. It is a combination of Variyassi/Variaththi and the plural suffix -ar.

In the text Kerala Visheshamahatmyam, Variyars are referred to as Parashava. According to Yajnavalkya, children born to a Brahmin father and a Shudra mother are designated by the name Parashava. Consequently, many Variyars affix or prefix the title Parashava when writing their names in Sanskrit.

According to community legend, a bone once fell inside a temple, and a Shudra woman removed and discarded it at the request of a Brahmin priest. As a result of this action, she was excommunicated from her caste. Taking pity on her condition, the Brahmin priest maintained a relationship with her. The descendants born from this relationship came to be known as Variyars.

== Social status and occupations ==
Variyars are classified by William Logan in Malabar Manual as Brahmins placed in Ambalavasi, an intermediate class/ Antaralar class between Nambudiri and Nayar. Variyars are mentioned as performing lower temple services and funeral services, as per Logan.

Some Variyar families traditionally held the title Aasan (meaning Acharya), and men from these households historically served as hereditary teachers in the families of local chieftains.

Variyars are generally well-educated and engage in specialized study of Sanskrit. Members of the community often practiced as traditional physicians (vaij) and astrologers.

Their traditional occupations are primarily connected to Shaivite temples. These duties include:

- Gathering and stringing flowers for deities
- Preparing naivedya (food offerings)
- Carrying torches and processional umbrellas during deity processions
- Cleaning and maintaining temple premises
- Safekeeping the belongings and ornaments of the deity

== Religious practices and rituals ==
While Variyars mainly worship Shiva, they also offer worship to Vishnu, Subrahmanya, Shaasta, and Ganesha. Most of their customs, rituals, and religious practices closely resemble those of Nambudiri Brahmins.

=== Shivadiksha ===
Boys between the ages of 12 and 16 undergo an initiation ceremony known as Shivadiksha, which is a variation of the thread ceremony (Upanayana). Completion of this ritual is a mandatory prerequisite for marriage.

- On an auspicious moment, the boy and the priest dress in new clothes and perform worship of a pot (kalasha) filled with water.
- The priest pours the water over the boy's head, followed by tonsure for both.
- Following additional rites, the boy puts on new attire, drapes a shawl (pamari), and applies holy ash (bhasma) and sandalwood paste to his forehead.
- He wears a rudraksha garland and ornaments, asks for alms (bhiksha) from his mother, and walks seven steps in the direction of Kashi.

=== Death rites ===
Variyars cremate their dead and observe an 11-day period of ritual impurity (sutak). They also perform shraddha ceremonies for deceased ancestors.

== Marriage customs ==
Two distinct marriage practices exist within the community: Talikettu Kalyanam and Kudiveppu.

- Talikettu Kalyanam: The ritual tying of the tali is conducted before a girl reaches puberty. Once she comes of age, she is married to a man.
- Kudiveppu: A form of marriage where the couple lives together as husband and wife. The wedding is held at the bride's house. The groom arrives in a procession with relatives, bathes at the bride's home, and wears clothes touched by the bride. After a homa (sacred fire ritual), the bride is brought to the wedding canopy (mandap), and rites modeled after Nambudiri Brahmin traditions are performed. Following sunset, the groom performs Ganesha worship. Upon returning to the groom's house, the couple sits on a seat covered with grass (trina), tiger skin (vyaghrajina), and a white sheet, where married women (suvashini) perform a ritual welcoming with lamps (aarti), known as Dikshavaripu.

Over time, traditional customs among the Variyars have continued to adapt to changing times.

== Notable people ==
Notable people called Variar, Variyar, or Warrier include

- Aishwarya Warrier-a Mohiniyattam dancer, art educator, choreographer, and researcher.
- C. B. C. Warrier– Ex-Member of Legislative Assembly (Kerala)
- E. Ikkanda Warrier (1890–1977) – the first and the last prime minister of the state of Cochin, India, beginning in 1948.
- Gopi Warrier – specialising in Ayurvedic medicine, playwright and poet.
- Jayaraj Warrier – Actor
- Kaikulangara Rama Variar- a scholar, poet, astrologer/astronomer, and commentator and translator of several well known Sanskrit treatises dealing with a variety of subjects.
- Madhu Wariar – actor and producer, brother of Manju Warrier
- Manju Warrier – an Indian actress and dancer in the Malayalam film industry.
- Mridula Warrier – playback singer.
- N. V. Krishna Warrier – an Indian poet, journalist, scholar, academic and political thinker.
- P. K. R. Warrier – a cardiothoracic surgeon, author and social activist.
- P. K. Warrier – Indian Ayurvedic physician.
- Priya Prakash Varrier – Actress and Model
- Rajan Warrier – Infamous missing persons' case
- Rajashree Warrier – Bharata Natyam dancer.
- Ramapurathu Warrier -pioneer of the "Vanchipattu" or Boat-song form of poetry in Malayalam language.
- Sachin Warrier – playback singer and composer in the Malayalam cinema industry.
- Sandeep Varier – Indian politician, MLA incumbent Thrikaripur.
- Sankarankutty Sandeep Warrier – an Indian first-class cricketer.
- Sankara Variar – an astronomer-mathematician of the Kerala school of astronomy and mathematics.
- Shashi Warrier – author.
- Shobha Warrier, a journalist
- T. Sankara Warrier- Indian civil servant and administrator who served as the Diwan of the Kingdom of Cochin
- Unnayi Variyar-a poet, writer, scholar, and dramatist who lived in Thiruvananthapuram, India during the 17th/18th century.
- Vaidyaratnam P. S. Varier

== See also ==
- Ambalavasi
