= Nelakondapalli =

Nelakondapalli Dharanigiripuram
- Town
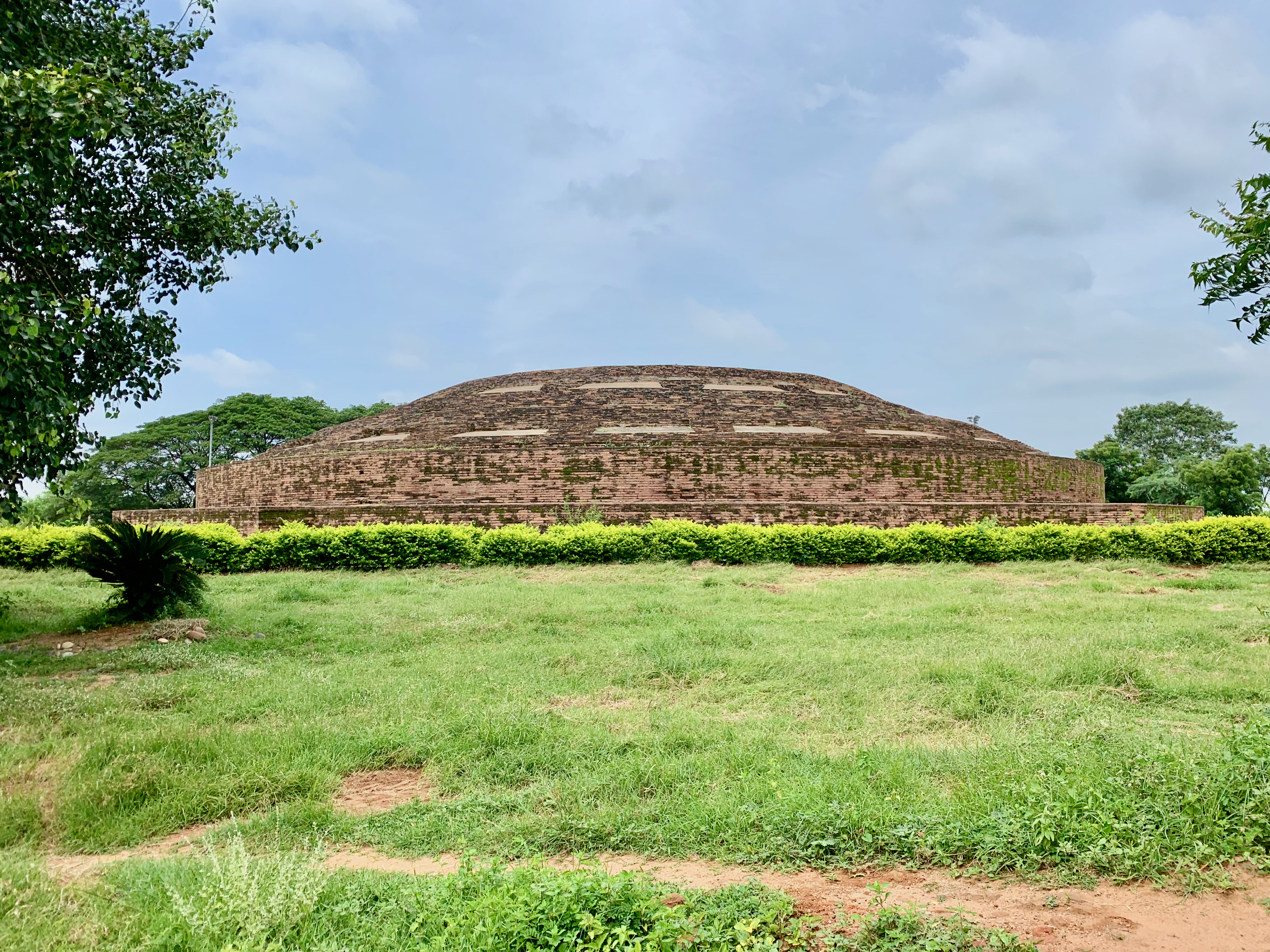
- 100 BCE – 300 CE Buddhist stupa complex in village nearby

- Location in Telangana, India Nelakondapalli (India)
- Coordinates: 17.100°N 80.0506°E
- Country: India
- State: Telangana
- District: Khammam

Languages
  - Official: Telugu
- Time zone: UTC+5:30 (IST)
- PIN: 507160
- Vehicle registration: TG
- Nearest city: Khammam
- Literacy: 66%
- Lok Sabha constituency: Khammam
- Website: www.khammam.nic.in

Nelakondapally, also referred to as Nelakondapalli or Nela Kondapalli, is a town and headquarters of a mandal in Khammam district, Telangana, India. It is also an archaeological site important to early Buddhism and Hinduism, where excavations have discovered a major stupa site near an ancient manmade lake, another site where Buddhist and Hindu artwork were carved in pre-3rd century India, both sites also yielding hundreds of ancient rare coins with Shaiva and Vaishnava inscriptions from the dynasties of Andhra Ikshvakus and Vishnukundinas. Nelakondapally is also the birthplace of Bhakta Ramadasu.

== Location ==
Nelakondapalli is located 21 kilometers southwest of Khammam, 58 km east-southeast of Suryapet and close to the Telangana–Andhra Pradesh border. It is connected to the Indian national highway grid with NH365A, the link between Khammam to Kodad and Kusumanchi. Nelakondapalli is not to be confused with Kondapalli, another different ancient town in the Deccan region. Historic Telugu and Sanskrit inscriptions mention Kondapalli, where the context clarifies whether they refer to Nelakondapalli or the other Kondapalli located over a hill and was once a hill-fort. In contrast,Nela means land and Nelakondapalli was linked to major Deccan cities on one of the ancient trade roads connecting north, east and south India.

== History ==
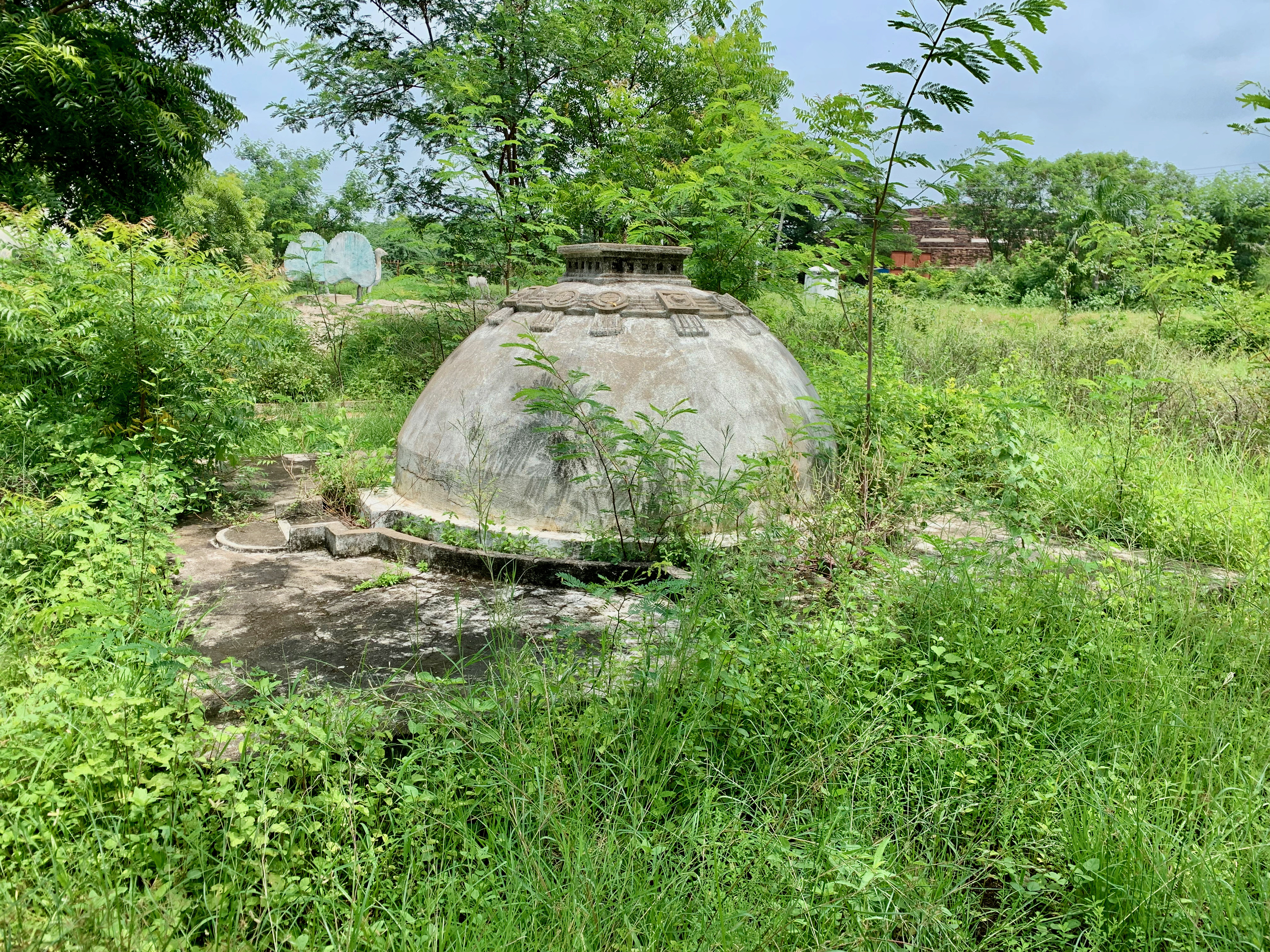
The Nelakondapalle area was a significant human settlement since at least c. 100 BCE, with early Buddhist presence evidence by a vihara, pottery and coins excavated between 1970 and 1990.

Nelakondapalli was a major town in ancient history. This is evidenced by one of the largest Buddhist stupas discovered in the Deccan (Dakhina, Dakhinapatha) region about 2 kilometers northeast of the contemporary village location, along with Satavahana era sites scattered around the village. Situated midst the farm fields and next to a large ancient manmade lake, this maha-stupa (mahachaitya) is co-located with brick lined vihara complex, wells, cisterns. Near this site, archaeological excavations have also unearthed terracotta figurines, hundreds of coins from early Hindu dynasties, a bronze statue of Buddha and a small model stupa carved in limestone. In addition to Buddhist artwork, inscriptions stones and inscribed articles from 5th to 12th-centuries have been discovered in Nelakondapalli suggesting that the site remained active and historically important to Telugu culture through the Western Chalukya, Eastern Chalukya of Vengi, and Kakatiya eras. Its importance is confirmed by literary references in Telugu and Sanskrit texts as (Nela)kondapalli-300 or Kondapalli-300 Panugallu. Kakatiya era inscriptions state that the local Recherla rulers made gifts to goddess temples here in the 12th century. Another inscription called the Nelakondapalli inscription of Krishnadevaraya is dated to the Vijayanagara Empire era, attesting to Nelakondapalli in the early 16th century.

Most of the historic Buddhist and Hindu structures were missing by the 19th-century, including the Hindu temples mentioned in various inscriptions. A survey commissioned by the Nizam of Hyderabad in 1934 reported scattered temple ruins and a beheaded Nandi in Nelakondapalli. Archaeological excavations began after local farmers reported finding buried reliefs and statues. This initiative began in the 1970s and were completed in stages through the 1990s.

The Nelakondapalli village is the birthplace of Bhakta Ramadasa who helped established the major Rama temple in Bhadrachalam, where textual records refer to Nelankondapally as Bhugiri.

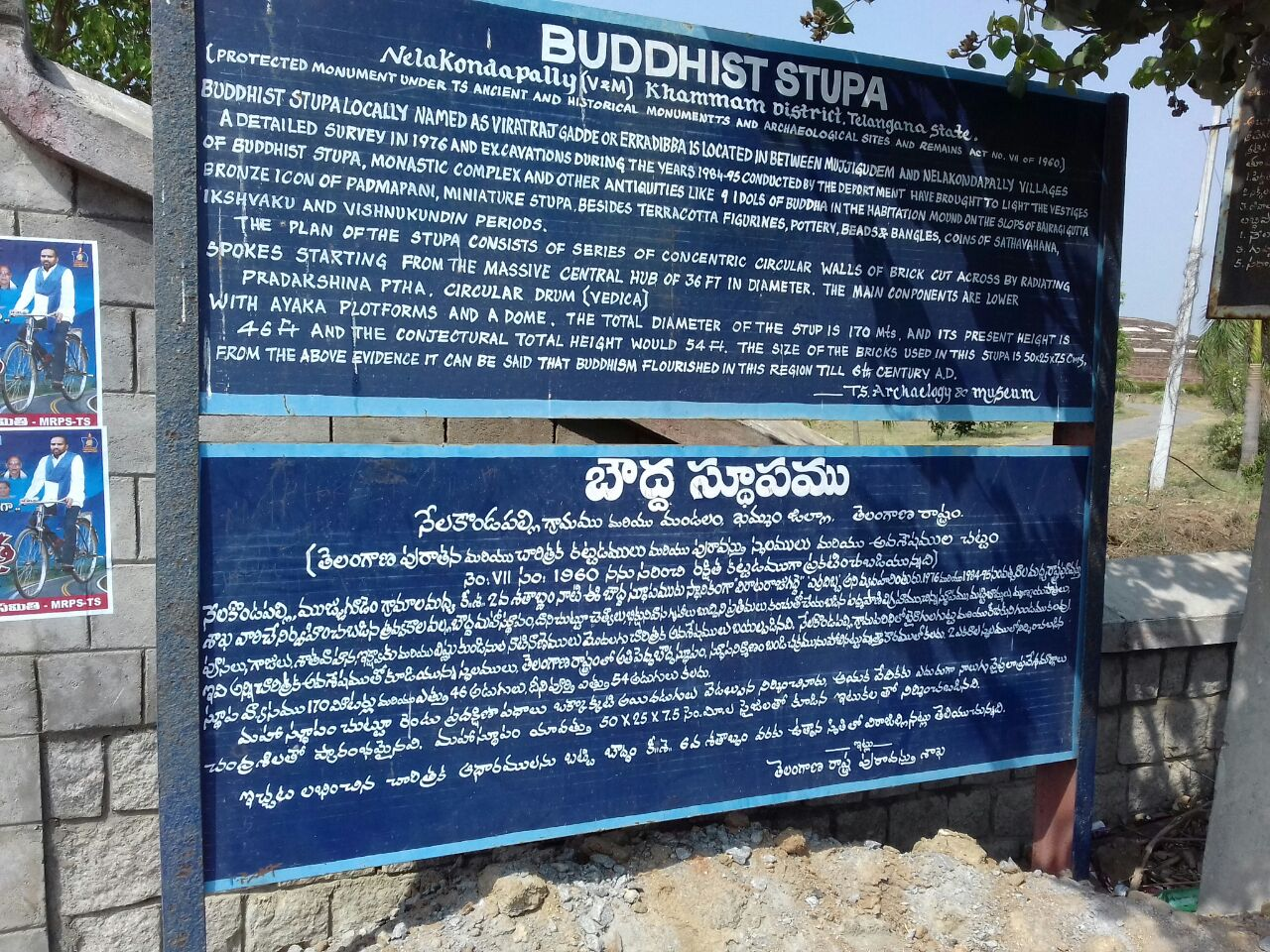
This information plaque describes a Buddhist Stupa excavated by Archeological Survey of India. In Telugu language is a description of Virata Raju Dibba and a location Kichaka Gundam nearby that locals believe are related to events in Mahabharata.

=== Buddhist archaeological site ===
About 2 kilometers northeast of Nelakondapalli village is a large ancient manmade lake. Along it, midst the farms, are three sites locally known as Viratrajgadde, Erradibba and Byragulagutta. In the 1970s, the villagers accidentally stumbled upon portions of limestone panels and broken parts of a Buddha statue. They reported their findings to the state archaeological department – then under Andhra Pradesh, now Telangana. The state archaeology department undertook excavations between 1976 and 1985, over several seasons given the state's budget constraints. These excavations uncovered one of the largest stupas (54 feet high, 84 feet inner diameter, 138 feet outer diameter) with a ring and spoke architecture. The entire site is about 200 meters by 200 meters, incIudes brick lined foundation of east-west and north-south oriented vihara complexes. The unearthed foundation were in two layers, the older layer below the upper layer, likely a repair and reconstruction in a later century. In addition to the foundation, numerous coins, panels, statue parts, figurines, and wares were found in the upper strata from Ikshvaku and Vishnukundin era, similar to those found in many other parts of India. These findings suggest that the Nellakondapalli Buddhist site was likely a monastery on a trade route, likely in existence before the 1st century CE according to some scholars, and active till at least the 4th to 5th century.

One of the inscribed votive stupa discovered during these excavations is dated by Himanshu Prabha Ray between the 3rd to 4th-century CE. According to Ray, the site should be dated to a bit later era based on the epigraphical evidence and the fact that ancient coins tended to remain in circulation for an extended periods of time. The Nelakondapalli site, states Ray, is of historic significance, and was one of many located along the trans-peninsular trade route of ancient Greater India, connecting the Krishna river valley to other parts of the Indian subcontinent. The other sites that traders and monks likely frequented via Nelakondapalli were Kondapur, Dhulikatta on their way to Ter and Paithan.

=== Satavahana site ===
Additional though limited excavations in and around Nelakondapalli has unearthed wares, coins, brick foundations, and similar evidence of a much larger ancient town where Buddhist and Hindu panels and artwork were produced. The discovery of hundreds of Satavahana coins which are commonly found in Deccan sites and of Ikshavaku coins that are rare in Telangana – southwestern parts of Nalgonda district being only other site – attests to Nelakondapallu's importance to the regional trade networks, economy and its ancient prosperity.

Most of the major discoveries from the Nelakondapalli site have been relocated. A few inscribed pillars and broken parts are now in the modern era Hindu temples and a small village library. Larger, more sophisticated, and damaged Buddhist and Hindu statues and artworks from Nelakondapallii were moved to Vijayawada museum and other locations, though since the early 1990s, the regional tourism departments have printed marketing brochures showing Nelakondapalli site with Buddhist and Hindu artifacts.

== Temples ==
There are several Hindu temples in the village, one mosque and one denominational church.

=== Bhaktha Ramadas ===
Nelakondapalli was the birthplace of 17th-century Kancharla Gopanna, popularly known as Bhakta Ramadas. He was the builder of the Sree Seetha Ramachandra Swamy temple at Bhadrachalam, one dedicated to Sita and Rama of the epic Ramayana fame. He was cherished by the Hindus of his time, and punished by the then Muslim officials. He was accused of misappropriation of revenue he collected in order to build the major Rama temple, instead of depositing it to the treasury of the Sultanate. He was then arrested under the orders of the Sultan of Golconda Abul Hasan Qutb Shah (Tana Shah, Tanishah). He served several years in Golconda Sultanate prison, where the Hindu god Rama appeared in a dream per a local legend. Gopanna was released from the prison when someone donated the disputed amount to the Sultan. Gopanna's contributions to Bhadrachalam and the regional Hindu community is commemorated every year in a festival at Nelakondapalli and Bhadrachalam as Bhakta Ramadasa Utsavalu.

== Educational institutions ==
- Saraswathi Vidyalayam
- Govt High School
- ZPSS(G) School
- Ushodaya Vidyalayam
- Vikas High School
- Goutham concept school
- Gouthami Junior college
- Vasundhara Vocational Junior College
- Govt Degree College, Nelakondapalli
- Sri Chaitanya Junior College
- SFS

== Popular culture ==
Nelakondapalli is featured in the Telugu movie Rajanna, the character "Rajanna" played by Nagarjuna hails from this place.
