= Aishwarya Warrier =

Mohiniyattam dancer

Aishwarya Warrier ഐശ്വര്യ വാര്യർ
- Born: Ayswaria Menon; 29 June 1975 (age 50); Calicut, Kerala, India
- Occupations: Indian classical dancer, Art educator & Researcher
- Years active: 1995–present
- Spouse: Rajesh Wariar
- Children: Sukanya Wariar
- Parent(s): Mukundan Menon & Sreebala Menon
- Website: www.ayswariawariar.com

Aishwarya Warrier is a Mohiniyattam dancer, art educator, choreographer, and researcher. Born in Calicut, Kerala, Ayswaria grew up in Mumbai and later settled in Vadodara, Gujarat. She was initiated into the art of Indian classical dance at the age of five by her mother, Sreebala Menon. As a child, Ayswaria was also a voice over artist, working under the guidance of her father, Mukundan Menon, who was a speaker and script writer at the Films Division of India. Subsequently, Ayswaria trained in the two styles of Bharatanatyam and Mohiniyattam under eminent Gurus such as Dr.Sucheta Bhide Chapekar, Udyogamandal Vikraman, and Kalamandalam Saraswathi. Ayswaria learnt the finer aspects of netrabhinaya from Margi Usha, and she obtained guidance in Sopana Sangeetham under Padma Bhushan Kavalam Narayana Panicker. She is the artistic director of Nrityodaya School of Classical Dance, Vadodara, Gujarat and the Director at Ayswaria's Institute for Creative Expression (A I C E), Navi Mumbai, Maharashtra.

== Career ==
2019- 2021- Aishwarya Warrier was the Regional Director for Indira Gandhi National Centre for the Arts (IGNCA), Regional Centre, Vadodara. In the year 2016, Aishwarya Warrier directed and produced a Mohiniyattam dance film titled, “Nilima – beyond the blue…. an exploration”, which is based on a sublime poem by renowned author and musicologist, Mali Madhavan Nair.

== Notable dance performances ==
Indo Bhutan Friendship – 50 years celebrations (ICCR Tour to Bhutan), Paju Book Festival, South Korea; Soorya Festival Tour to UAE &, Festival Of India at Moscow, St. Petersburg and Pskov in Russia (ICCR Tour).
