= Bhadrachalam =

Bhadrachalam Bhadradri
- Temple town
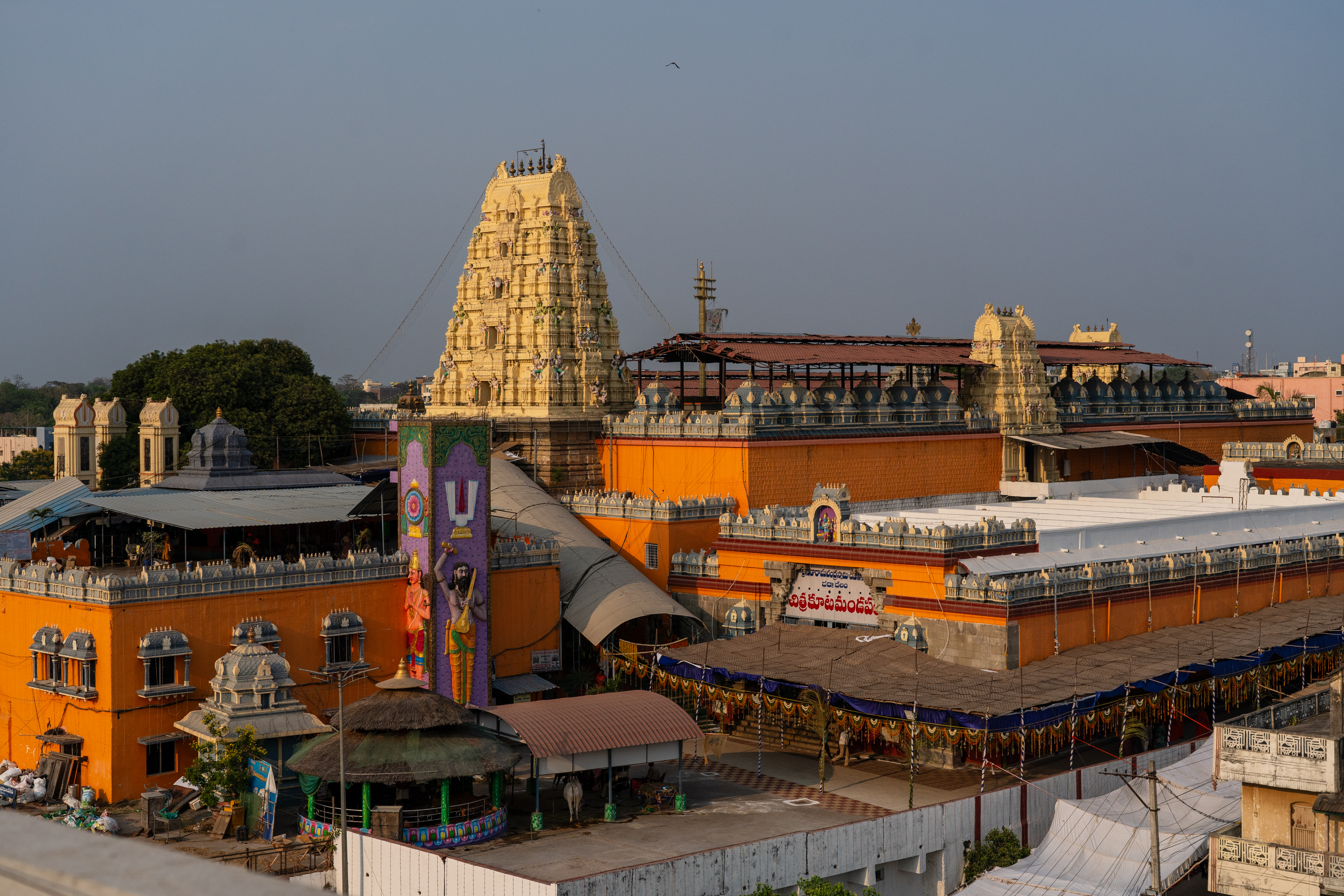
- Bhadrachalam Temple

- Bhadrachalam (Telangana) Bhadrachalam (India)
- Coordinates: 17.666903835687577°N 80.88264531302039°E
- Country: India
- State: Telangana
- District: Bhadradri Kothagudem district

Government
  - Body: Municipality

Area
  - Total: 12.00 km^{2} (4.63 sq mi)
- Elevation: 90 m (300 ft)

Population (2011)
  - Total: 50,087
  - Rank: 40th in Telangana
  - Density: 7,121/km^{2} (18,440/sq mi)

Languages
  - Official: Telugu
- Time zone: UTC+5:30 (IST)
- PIN: 507111
- Telephone code: 08743
- Vehicle registration: TG-28
- Sex ratio: 1:1 ♂/♀
- Distance from Kothagudem: 40 kilometres (25 mi)
- Distance from Hyderabad: 325 kilometres (202 mi)
- Website: telangana.gov.in www.telanganatourism.gov.in

Bhadrachalam is a census town in Bhadradri Kothagudem district in the Indian state of Telangana. It is an important Hindu pilgrimage town with the Bhadrachalam Temple of Rama, situated on the banks of Godavari River. It is located 325 kilometres (202 mi) east of state capital, Hyderabad,115 kilometres (71 mi) from Khammam,178 kilometres (111 mi) from Suryapet,180 kilometres (112 mi) from Warangal,187 kilometres (116 mi) from Vijayawada, 220 kilometres (137 mi) and 350 kilometres (217 mi) from Visakhapatnam.

== History ==
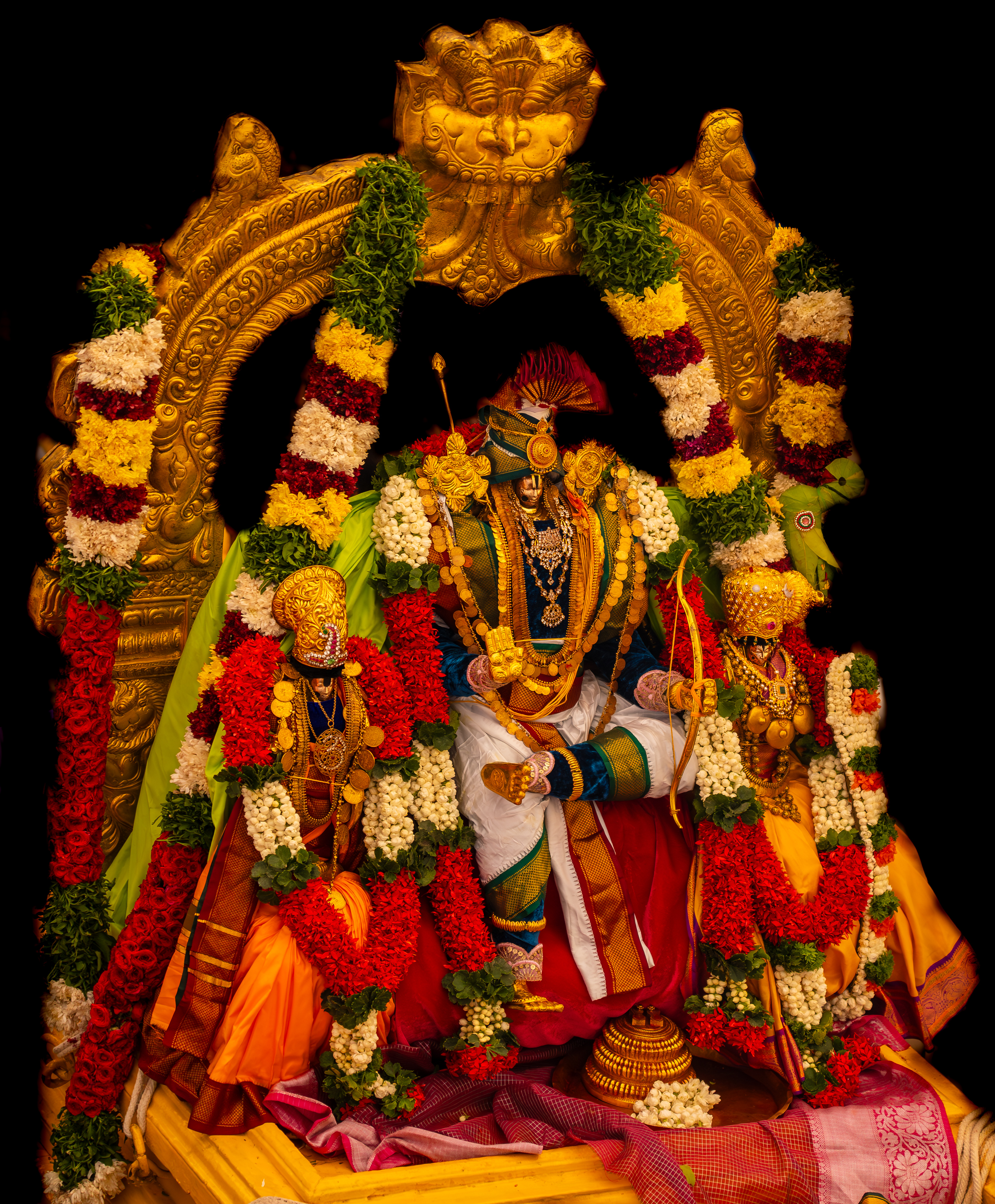
Murti of Rama, Lakshmana, and Sita on the eve of Rama Pattabhisheka

The town has a Rama Temple constructed c. 17th century CE by Kancherla Gopanna.

The Bhadrachalam area also has several Hindu temples associated with the epic Ramayana.

== Geography ==
Bhadrachalam is located at 17.67°N 80.88°E. It has an average elevation of 50 metres (164 feet). The zero feet gauge level of Godavari River at Bhadracham is equal to +32.6 m msl.

== Climate ==
Climate data for Bhadrachalam (1991–2020)
Month	Jan	Feb	Mar	Apr	May	Jun	Jul	Aug	Sep	Oct	Nov	Dec	Year
Record high °C (°F)	37.1 (98.8)	40.0 (104.0)	42.8 (109.0)	46.4 (115.5)	48.6 (119.5)	47.5 (117.5)	40.8 (105.4)	38.2 (100.8)	39.2 (102.6)	38.2 (100.8)	36.0 (96.8)	37.6 (99.7)	48.6 (119.5)
Mean daily maximum °C (°F)	30.7 (87.3)	33.8 (92.8)	37.1 (98.8)	39.2 (102.6)	41.1 (106.0)	37.0 (98.6)	32.7 (90.9)	31.6 (88.9)	32.7 (90.9)	32.4 (90.3)	31.2 (88.2)	30.1 (86.2)	34.3 (93.7)
Mean daily minimum °C (°F)	17.7 (63.9)	20.0 (68.0)	23.1 (73.6)	25.7 (78.3)	27.6 (81.7)	26.6 (79.9)	25.2 (77.4)	24.6 (76.3)	24.7 (76.5)	23.5 (74.3)	20.2 (68.4)	17.0 (62.6)	23.1 (73.6)
Record low °C (°F)	8.4 (47.1)	9.2 (48.6)	10.6 (51.1)	17.0 (62.6)	18.6 (65.5)	19.4 (66.9)	20.0 (68.0)	19.8 (67.6)	19.5 (67.1)	14.4 (57.9)	10.0 (50.0)	8.4 (47.1)	8.4 (47.1)
Average rainfall mm (inches)	3.9 (0.15)	5.3 (0.21)	4.8 (0.19)	34.1 (1.34)	38.4 (1.51)	127.5 (5.02)	307.3 (12.10)	325.0 (12.80)	180.8 (7.12)	74.9 (2.95)	18.0 (0.71)	9.2 (0.36)	1,129.3 (44.46)
Average rainy days	0.4	0.3	0.5	1.6	2.4	6.9	14.1	13.4	7.9	4.4	1.4	0.3	53.6
Average relative humidity (%) (at 17:30 IST)	55	46	44	44	40	56	73	77	77	73	65	61	59
Source: India Meteorological Department

== Demographics ==
As of 2001 India census, Bhadrachalam had a population of 55,352. As of 2001, Males constitute 50% of the population and females 50%. Bhadrachalam has an average literacy rate of 73%, higher than the national average of 59.5%. 11% of the population is under 6 years of age.
