= Ramadasu (1964 film) =

1964 Indian Telugu-language film directed by V. Nagayya

- Theatrical release poster
- Directed by: V. Nagayya
- Written by: Yadavalli Lakshmi Narayana; Malladi Satyanarayana (dialogues)
- Screenplay by: V. Nagayya
- Based on: Life of Kancharla Gopanna
- Produced by: V. Nagayya
- Starring: V. Nagayya; Gummadi; Relangi; Ramana Reddy; C.S.R; Vangara
- Cinematography: K. S. Prasad; Jagirdaar
- Edited by: G. D. Joshi; A. S. Tangaveelu
- Music by: Ashwathama; V. Nagayya (Supervision)
- Production company: V. N. Films
- Release date: 23 December 1964
- Running time: 180 minutes
- Country: India
- Language: Telugu

Ramadasu is a 1964 Indian Telugu-language biographical film, based on the life of Kancharla Gopanna, produced and directed by V. Nagayya. It stars Nagayya, with Gummadi, Relangi, Ramana Reddy and N. T. Rama Rao. Akkineni Nageswara Rao, Sivaji Ganesan as well as Anjali Devi make special appearances, with music composed by Ashwathama. The blockbuster film won the National Film Award for Best Feature Film in Telugu, as well as several state awards.

== Cast ==
- V. Nagayya as Kancharla Gopanna / Ramadasu
- Gummadi as Kabir das
- Relangi as Baadipanthulu
- Ramana Reddy as Ahmak Shah
- C.S.R as Dharmakartha Pratap Giri Panthulu
- Vangara as Priest Seenaiah
- Allu Ramalingaiah as Dharmakarta's acolyte
- Mudigonda Lingamurthy as Madanna
- A. V. Subba Rao as Akkanna
- Pasala Surya Chandra Rao as Tanisha
- Dr. Sivaramakrishnaiah as Dawood
- Rama Sharma as Young Gopanna
- Sarla Brahmana as Moulvi
- Ramappa Panthulu as Sitarama Sastry
- Tennies Rama Rao as Allaudin
- Lanka Satyam as Abbas
- Kannamba as Kamalamba
- Rushyendramani as Shyamalamba
- Tanguturi Suryakumari as Sitara Begam
- Prabhavathi as Chand Bibi
- Rajasri as Young Kamala
- Ratnapapa as Dilaara
- Lakshmi as Sitamba
- Master Nagaraju as Raghunatha

=== Special appearances ===
- N. T. Rama Rao as Rama
- Akkineni Nageswara Rao as Vishnu
- Sivaji Ganesan as Lakshmana
- Anjali Devi as Lakshmi

== Soundtrack ==
Ramadasu

Film score by Aswadhamma
- Released: 1964
- Genre: Soundtrack
- Label: His Master's Voice
- Producer: Aswadhamma

Music composed by Aswadhama. Music released on His Master's Voice.

S. No.	Song title	Singers	length
1	"Adigo Badradri"	Ghantasala, P. B. Srinivas, A. P. Komala	
2	"Dandakam"	V. Nagayya	
3	"Dhanyudanaithini O Deva"	V. Nagayya	
4	"Ee Desamanununduvaru"	Madhavapeddi Satyam	
5	"Jai Seetharama Raghu Rama"	V. Nagayya	
6	"Kahekarona"	Mohammad Rafi	
7	"Kondanda Rama"	V. Nagayya	
8	"Maa Bava Manchivadu"	P. Susheela	
9	"Mohanakaara Rama"	Soolamangalam Sisters	
10	"Naraharini Nammaka"	V. Nagayya	
11	"O Saadhulara"	V. Nagayya, T. G. Kamala Devi	
12	"Padyams"	V. Nagayya	
13	"Padyams"	V. Nagayya	
14	"Pahimam Sriramante"	Soolamangalam Sisters	
15	"Ram Naam Se Jyaada"	Mohammad Rafi	
16	"Ramadasugaru"	Madhavapeddi Satyam	
17	"Rama Pahimam"	Sulamangalam Sisters	
18	"Rama Rama Anarada"	V. Nagayya	
19	"Rama Rama Yanuarada"	V. Nagayya	
20	"Ye Desam"	Madhavapeddi Satyam	

== Awards ==
National Film Awards

- National Film Award for Best Feature Film in Telugu - 1964

== Other ==
- VCDs & DVDs on - VOLGA Videos, Hyderabad
