= Bhadrachala Ramadasu =

17th century Indian composer and poet

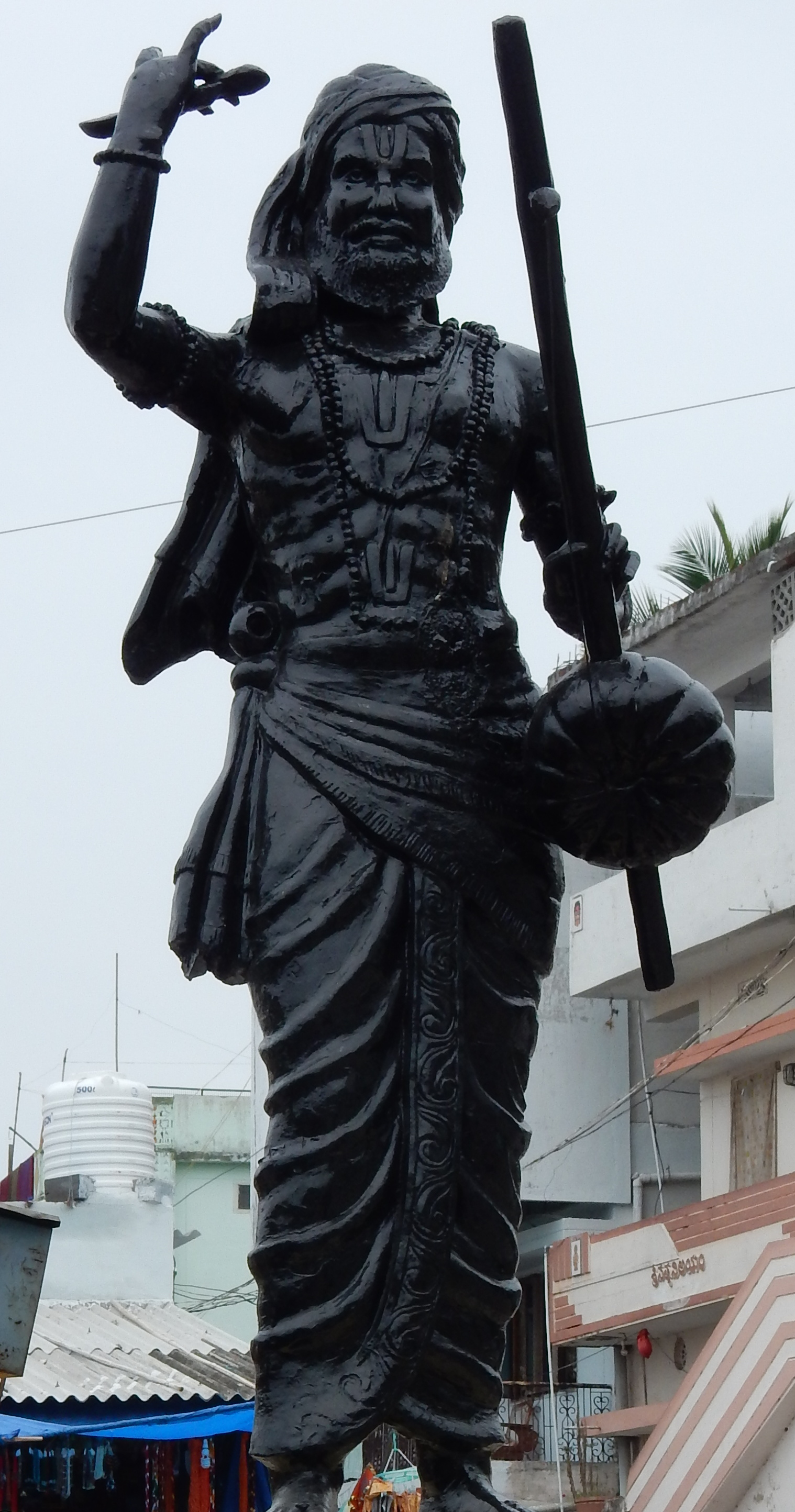
- A statue of Bhakta Ramadasu singing a song in Rama's praise

Background information
- Also known as: Ramadasu, Bhakta Ramadasu
- Born: Kancharla Gopanna (Goparaju) c. 1620; Nelakondapalli, Golconda Sultanate (present-day Khammam District, Telangana, India)
- Died: 1688 (aged 68) Bhadrachalam
- Genre: Carnatic music
- Occupations: Tehsildar and Vaggeyakara
- Website: bhadrachalaramadasu.com

Kancharla Gopanna (Telugu: కంచర్ల గోపన్న) (c. 1620 – 1688), popularly known as Bhakta Ramadasu or Bhadrachala Ramadasu (Telugu: భద్రాచల రామదాసు), was a 17th-century devotee of the Hindu god Rama, a saint-poet and a composer of Carnatic music. He is a famous Vaggeyakara (classical composer) (Note: This title denotes a person who not only composes lyrics but also sets them to music; Vāk denotes a word or speech while Geyakāra denotes a singer with the prefix Geya meaning singing or singable in Sanskrit.) from the Telugu classical era. He was born in the village of Nelakondapalli in Khammam district, and orphaned as a teenager. He spent his later years in Bhadrachalam and 14 years in solitary confinement at the Golconda prison during the Qutb Shahi rule. Different mythical stories about his life circulate in the Telugu tradition. He is renowned for constructing the famous Sita Ramachandraswamy Temple and pilgrimage center on the banks of river Godavari at Bhadrachalam. His devotional kirtana lyrics to Rama illustrate the classical Pallavi, Anupallavi and Charanam genre composed mostly in Telugu, some in Sanskrit and with occasional use of Tamil language. These are famous in South Indian classical music as Ramadaasu Keertanalu.

Ramadasu was a Sri Vaishnava. Ramadasu was a writer of Telugu satakams. He wrote the Daasarathi Satakamu (దాశరథి శతకము) with a 'makuTamu' (మకుటము) 'Daasarathee Karunaa payonidhee' (దాశరథీ కరుణా పయోనిధీ), a collection of nearly 108 poems dedicated to Rama.

== Early life and background ==
Kancherla Gopanna (Goparaju), later known as Bhakta Ramadasu, was born in a moderately well to do Telugu speaking Niyogi Brahmin family to Linganna Mantri and Kamamba in Nelakondapalli village in the Khammam District of Telangana. He was orphaned in his teens, triggering an impoverished life, sustained by singing bhakti songs to Rama and collecting rice door to door. His life story has been largely reconstructed from poems he composed or is assumed to have composed, where there is a mention of events of his life. For example, one bhakti song mentions Narayanadasulu, a term linked to the Narayana mantra, is believed to be linked to Sri Vaishnavism guru Raghunatha Bhattacharya, who initiated him as a boy into the Dasarathi tradition. These and other hagiographic accounts found in Yakshagana or Harikatha compilations present him as a boy-prodigy with an impulsively creative mind composing lyrics on the Hindu god Rama.

His maternal uncles were the Madanna and Akkanna brothers. They had helped Abul Hasan Qutb Shah (Tana Shah) gain power after the death of Abdullah Qutb Shah in 1672, Tana Shah's father-in-law. As a reward for their material support during a power struggle with Aurangzeb and the Mughal Empire, the brothers were appointed ministers at the court of Tana Shah of the Qutb Shahi dynasty in Kingdom of Golconda. They helped their orphaned nephew Gopanna. Beyond this, little is known about his early life and much is shrouded in mythistory created by the later hagiographic tradition. He is said to have learned Telugu, Sanskrit, Persian, and Urdu.

== Career ==
In 1650, Gopanna traveled to Hyderabad to meet his maternal uncles, who were at that time working in the tax department of Golconda Sultanate under the minister Mirza Mohammed Sayyad. They persuaded the minister to give a job to their nephew Gopanna. Mirza Mohammed Sayyad appointed Gopanna in the tax collection department in Bhadrachalam, where the temple dedicated to Rama already existed.

A different version of his career is found in Ramadasu Charitra, a hagiographic Telugu text. It states that sometime after 1672, Ramadasu in his early 50s, was appointed as the tahsildar (tax collector) of 'Palvoncha Paragana' by Akkanna, his uncle, who was then a minister and the administrative head in the court of Qutub Shahi Sultan Abul Hassan Tana Shah.

There are contradictory stories about his life after he became the tehsildar and led the tax collection activities at Bhadrachalam. All these stories share a common theme – he collecting Jizya religious tax from Hindus in Bhadrachalam area, he reconstructing or building anew the famed large Rama temple of Bhadrachalam, partly with donations and partly with tax he had collected for the Golconda Sultanate, his arrest on charges of fraud and misuse of the taxes, he spending 14 years in solitary confinement in Golconda prison where he composed poems for the Lord Rama, his release and return to Bhadrachalam. In some version, god Rama and his brother Lakshmana reappear on earth and pay the ransom demanded by Golconda Sultanate for his release. In other versions, the Sultan under attack from Aurangzeb forces and facing imminent collapse, opens a new trial, finds him innocent and acquits him. The varying accounts are found in the records of the Dutch East India company, the temple's hagiography, and the regional Telugu oral traditions.

=== Reconstruction of temple ===
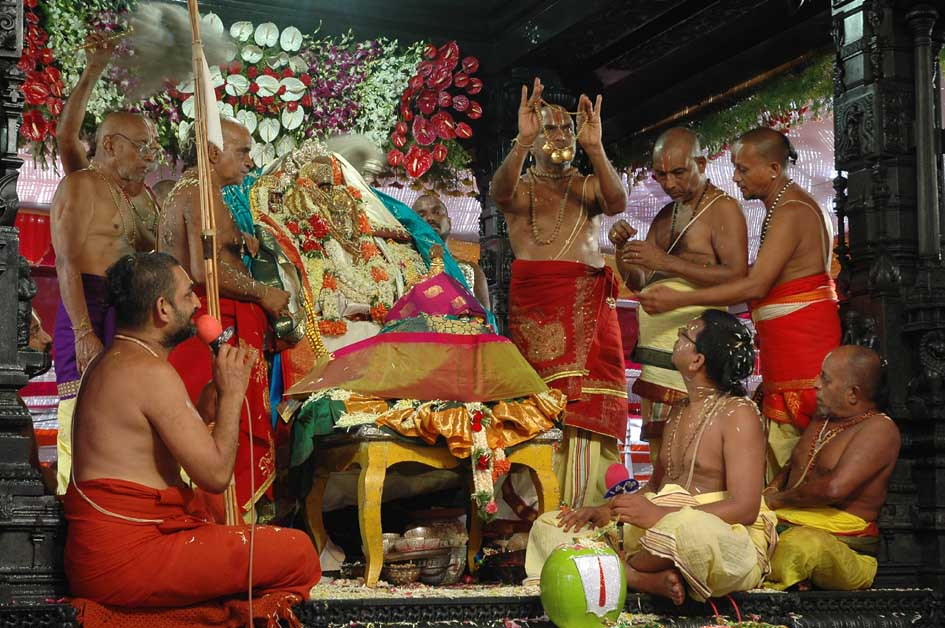
Sri Ramanavami Kalyanam utsava at Bhadrachalam Temple, in Telangana

Once, Ramadasu visited Bhadrachalam for a Jatara (fair) and was disturbed by the dilapidated state of the Rama temple there. Bhadrachalam is significant to devotees of Rama for many reasons. Lord Rama stayed near the Parnasala there with Sita and Lakshmana during his exile and also visited Shabari near Bhadrachalam (although it is believed that Shabari used to live near Kishkindha, the kingdom of Vanaras in Ramayana which is believed to be near Hampi ). Pothana is believed to have been given direction by Rama to translate the Bhagavata Purana into Telugu here. In spite of its significance, the temple was utterly neglected. So, Ramadasu started to raise funds for the renovation and reconstruction of the temple. After he emptied his coffers and could raise no more money, the villagers appealed him to spend his revenue collections for the reconstruction and promised to repay the amount after harvesting crops. As such, Ramadas finished the reconstruction of the temple with six hundred thousand rupees collected from land revenues - without the permission of the Abul Hasan Qutb Shah.

As the temple was nearing completion, he was perplexed one night about fixing the Sudarshana Chakra at the crest of the main temple. On the same night, it is believed that he saw Rama in his dream and asked him to have a holy dip in the Godavari River. When Gopanna did so the next day, it is believed that he found the holy Sudarshana Chakra in the river very easily.

"Government had appointed him as Tehsildar of Bhadrachalam. He was a great devotee of Lord Sri Ramachandra. He spent huge amounts from the Government treasury, constructed a. fine temple for his God. He also spent heavy amounts on valuable ornaments of gold and precious stones for Lord Sri Rama, his consort and his brothers. Government imprisoned and tortured him for the misappropriation of public funds without prior permission. Lord Sri Rama paid the money and got Gopanna released from the prison." (sic)

— Hawart and Martin (Seventeenth-century writers of the Dutch East India Company)

=== Incarceration ===
The story continues that soon after the reconstruction, his miseries started. He was dismissed from his job by his enemies who spread a lot of fake news. (near Hyderabad) Ramadas was cast into jail with orders that he be released only after the exchequer received all the taxes in full. Ramadas implores Rama through many emotional songs that were popularized from the stanzas of 'Dasaradhi Sathakam ' and 'Keertanas' of Bhakta Ramadasa. They praise the Lord for all his mysterious ways in popularizing his devotees and Ramadas regularly sings to the Lord. The songs end in a state of total and unconditional surrender to the will of the Almighty.

=== Release and Sultan's unanticipated devotion towards Rama ===
After twelve years, Sultan Tana Shah saw Rama in his dream and found Rama mudras (golden coins with Rama's image on it) beside him.
Thereafter he released Ramadasu and established a tradition to send Pearls to the Bhadrachalam temple on every Rama Navami festival and this tradition was continued by the next rulers like Nizams of Hyderabad.

== Compositions ==
Ramadasu is one of the bhakti movement poet-saints of Hinduism, and a revered composer in the Carnatic music tradition. His compositions are largely kirtan genre, all focused on the Hindu god Rama from the Ramayana. He is most known for his pallavi, anupallavi and caranam compositions in Telugu and some in Sanskrit. His musical mudras vary and are remembered by his name or his favorite place Bhadrachalam; for example, Ramadas, Bhadrachalavasa, Bhadradri, Bhadragiri, Bhadrasyla and others. His compositions were popular in his days, and influenced many into the modern age. This includes Tyagaraja who dedicated 5 of his own compositions in praise of Ramadasu, with one equating him to figures such as the Narada muni and bhakta Prahlada, legendary and much loved personalities in Hinduism.

He composed Dasarathi Satakam, a bhakti poem with didactic metric style whose lines and stanzas are often sung or shared in the regional Telugu tradition. However, like the works of many poet-saints and philosophers on the Indian subcontinent, it is unclear which of the poems attributed to Ramadasu were authentically composed by him. There are six compilations named after Ramadasu, four of which are all called Ramadasu Charitra, one called Bhadrachala Ramadasu and another called Bhakta Ramadasu. These are in the form of a Yakshagana or Harikatha about Ramadasu and his songs. They are from six authors – Yadavadasu, Singaridasu, Krishnadasu, Ayyagiri Veerbhadra Rao, Balaji Dasu, and Pentapati Rao. Many contain between 100 and 108, but one has 137 songs attributed to Ramadasu. Taken together, a total of 190 different compositions have been attributed to him, with one critical edition attributing 37 songs before he was arrested by Islamic authorities, 64 while he was held in jail for 12 years, and 31 songs in the final years after his release. Thus, 132 songs are likely to have been composed by Ramadasu. Further, a notable feature of Ramadasu's compositions is his knowledge and his use of ragas from both South Indian schools (20 ragas) and North Indian schools (17 ragas), thereby uniting the two classical musical traditions.

In non-scholarly claims feeding the popular imagination, many more compositions are attributed to him. For example, according to the Indian newspaper The Hindu, Ramadasu composed nearly 300 songs and his works on Rama moved the Sultan. The Navaratna krithis of Ramadasu are as follows:

#	Composition	Raga	Tāḷa	Language
1	Idigo Bhadradri	Varali	Ādi	Telugu
2	Sree Rama Namame	Atana	Ādi(Thisra)	Telugu
3	Paluke Bangaramayena	Anandabhairavi	Ādi	Telugu
4	Sree Ramula Divyanama	Sāvēri	Ādi	Telugu
5	Ramajogi Mandu	Kamas	Ādi	Telugu
6	Tarakamantramu	Dhanyasi	Ādi	Telugu
7	Hari Hari Rama	Kanada	Ādi	Telugu
8	Takkuvemi Manaku	Saurashtra	Ādi	Telugu
9	Kantinedu Maa Ramula	Nadanamakriya	Khandachapu	Telugu

The above krithis are sung on the occasion of Bhadrachala Ramadasu Jayathi Utsavam, which falls in January and February of every year. Carnatic musicians and singers all over India will perform in this event.

Other popular compositions of ramadasu are as follows:-

#	Composition	Raga	Tāḷa	Language
1	Ye teeruga	Nadanamakriya	Ādi	Telugu
2	Emayya rama	Kambhoji	Ādi	Telugu
3	Ennaganu rama bhajana	Pantuvaraali	Rūpaka	Telugu
4	Antha ramamayam	Anandabhairavi	Ādi	Telugu
5	Iskshvaku kula tilaka	Yadukulakamboji	Chapu	Telugu
6	Sri rama ni nama	Poorvi Kalyani	Ādi	Telugu
7	Ramachandrulu napai	Asaveri	Chapu	Telugu
8	Rama rama bhadrachala	Nilambari	Ādi	Telugu
9	Dorikane bhadrachala nilayudu	Kambhoji	Adi	Telugu
10	Bhajare sriramam	Kalyani	Ādi	Sanskrit
11	Rama chandrayajanka	Kurunji	Eka	Sanskrit
12	Dasaratha rama govindha	Shankarabharanam	Kapu	Telugu
13	Charanamule nammithi	Kapi	Ādi	Telugu
14	Pahi Rama Prabho	Madhyamavati	Jhampa	Telugu
15	Nanu brovamani cheppave	Kalyani	Chapu	Telugu
16	Thakkuvemi manaku	Suryakantham	Chapu	Telugu
17	Kamala nayana vasudeva	Shenjurutti	Roopakam	Sanskrit
18	Pavana rama	Dhanyasi	Adi	Telugu
19	Rama bhadra ra ra	Shankarabharanam	Tisra	Telugu
20	Nanda baalam	Manirangu	Adi	Sanskrit
21	Garuda gamana ra	Saveri	Adi	Telugu
22	Rama ra ra	Kamas	Adi	Telugu
23	Narahari deva janardhana	Yamunakalyani	Adi	Sanskrit
24	Palayamam sri	Sri	Adi	Sanskrit
25	Pahimam sri rama ante	Yadukulakamboji	Adi	Telugu

- Ramachandraya Janaka Rajaaja Manohara in Kurinji
- Tarakamantramu in Dhanyasi
- Ye Teeruga Nanu in Nadanamakriya
- Adigo Bhadradri in Varali
- Anta Ramamayam in Darbari Kannada
- Charanamulae Nammidhi in Kapi
- Rama Ra Ra in Kamas
- Dasharatha Rama Govindha in Kamas
- O Rama ni namamu in Poorvi Kalyani
- Paluke bangara mayena in Ananda Bhairavi

== Popular culture ==
- Stalwart V. Nagayya produced, directed, and essayed Kancherla Gopanna in Ramadasu which won the National Film Award.
- K. Raghavendra Rao directed Sri Ramadasu with Nagarjuna as Kancherla Gopanna.
