= Gopi Warrier =

Indian Ayurvedic medicine expert

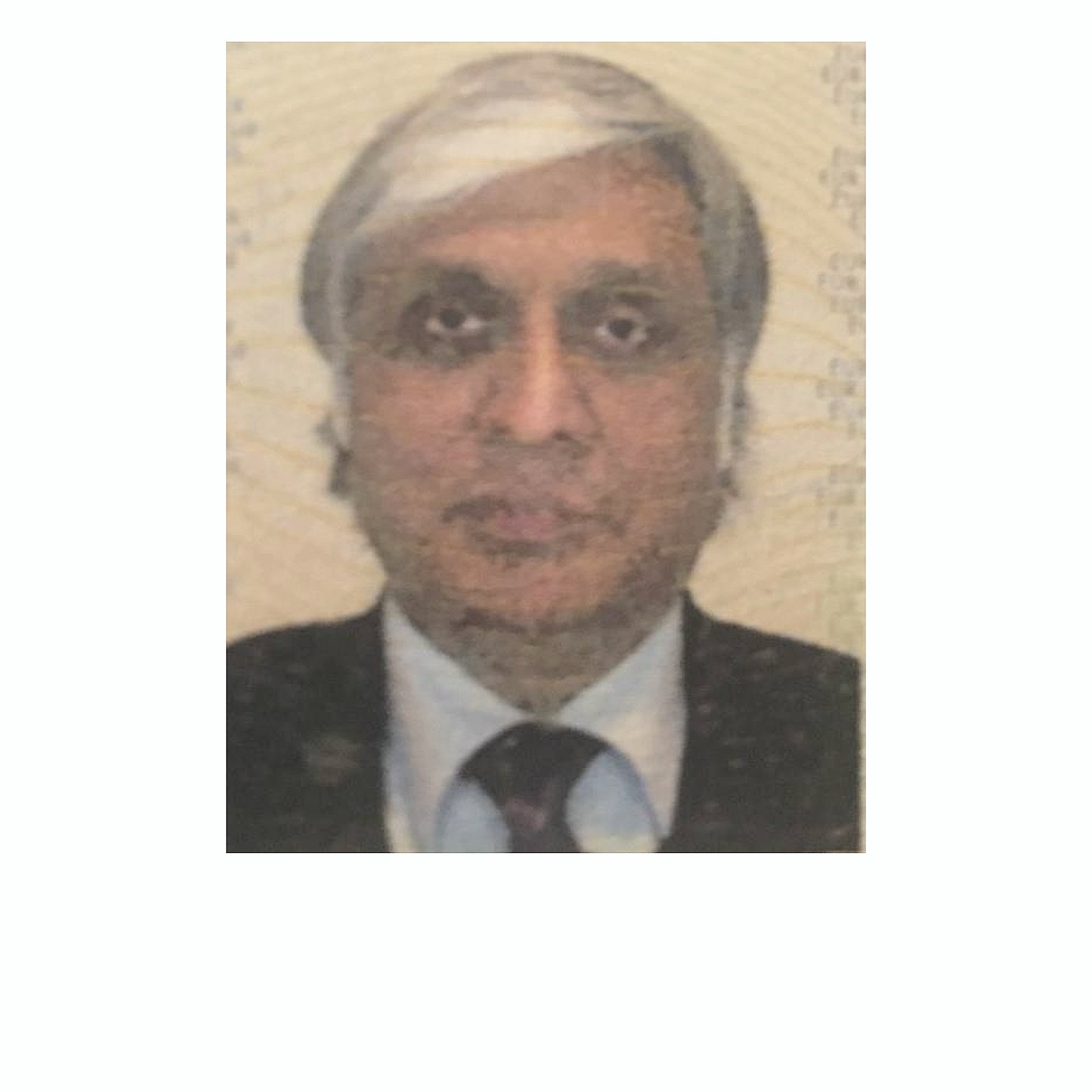
- Education: London Business School, Ecole des Hautes Etudes Commerciales, New York University
- Occupations: Ayurvedacharya, Playwright, Poet
- Spouse: Shrikala Warrier
- Parent: Govind Parameswara Warrier (G.P. Warrier)
- Website: http://poetryandbooksofgopiwarrier.com/

Gopi Warrier is a proponent of Indian Ayurvedic medicine, a playwright, and a poet.

== Life and career ==
=== Ayurvedic Charitable Hospital ===
In 2000, Warrier founded The Ayurvedic Charitable Hospital, with 30 beds, in London. Warrier criticised the commercial aspect of Ayurveda clinics in Western countries, claiming that they were set up to trick people out of their money. In 2006, the hospital received a court order to wind up its activities due to insolvency, and the company was dissolved in 2012.

=== Ayurvedic university ===
In 2004, Warrier, David McAlpine and Lady Sarah Morritt (trustees of the Ayurvedic Charitable Hospital) founded Mayur, the "Ayurvedic University of Europe", in London; it offers a B.Sc. degree in Ayurveda.

=== Ayurvedic restaurant ===
Warrier opened an “Ayurvedic restaurant” named Mantra in 2004 in the City of London. Rather than diners selecting dishes from a menu, the waiter would assess them and decide what food would be appropriate for them. The restaurant abandoned this approach the following year.

== Plays and poems ==
Warrier is the author of three books of poems, Varaha, and Lament of JC. and "Tenth Incarnation".

Warrier has staged several plays in London and Mumbai: God Sports, The Tenth Incarnation, Genesis of Karma -Three Faces of Evil, Siddhivinayak Saves Mumbai from Terror Attack. "Ego of the Yogis - Searching for Spirituality in a Contaminated World" and "A Polyester Lordship" in London at the Steiner Theatre.

== Bibliography ==
=== Ayurvedic medicine ===
- Gopi Warrier. Ayurveda: The Right Way to Live - The Ancient Indian Medical System, Focusing on the Prevention of Disease Through Diet, Lifestyle and Herbalism. Carlton Books, 2002. ISBN 978-1-84222-604-9
- Karen Sullivan, Harish L. Verma, Gopi Warrier. Secrets of Ayurveda. Dorling Kindersley, 2001. ISBN 978-0-7513-3563-7
- Gopi Warrier and Deepika Gunawant. The Complete Illustrated Guide to Ayurveda: the Ancient Indian Healing Tradition. Barnes & Noble, 1997. ISBN 978-0-7607-0702-9

=== Poetry ===
- Gopi Warrier and Amanda Brett. Lament of JC: Poems by Gopi Warrier. Delhi London Poetry Foundation, 1999. ISBN 978-0-9535679-0-4
- Gopi Warrier. Vahara: The Secret of Evolution - New and Selected Poems. Mayur University, 2009. ISBN 978-0-9535679-8-0
- Gopi Warrier. Karma is a Slow Virus. McAlpine & Hutton-Williams, London, 1988. ISBN 978-0-9514301-0-1
- Gopi Warrier. In a Country near Zimbabwe: Indian socialites, Interviewing a Brahmin. McAlpine Hutton-Williams, London, 1980. ISBN
- Gopi Warrier Tenth Incarnation - Destruction and Transformation of the Existing World Order. ISBN 9780-9535679-9-7 Delhi London Poetry Foundation 2013.
