= List of bazaars in Hyderabad =

The city of Hyderabad, India has a number of bazaars:

- Afzal Gunj
- Begum Bazaar
- Chatta Bazaar
- Jambagh flower market
- Laad Bazaar
- Madina, Hyderabad
- Moazzam Jahi Market
- Shahran Market
- Sultan Bazar
- Abids
- Shilparamam
- Pathargatti
