= Chatta Bazaar =

Bazaar in Hyderabad, India

Chatta Bazaar (English: Hive Market), is located in Hyderabad, India. Chatta Bazar is one of the oldest bazaars in Hyderabad and was the first to organize shops under a roof for better storage of goods.

Currently Chatta Bazar is known as one of the main markets for printing invitation cards, specifically calligraphed and decorated Urdu printing. There are about 250 printing presses in the market.

== See also ==
- Arabber
- Bazaar
- Bazaari
- Begum Bazaar
- Hawker centre (Asia) a centre where street food is sold
- Haat bazaar
- Laad Bazaar
- Market (place)
- Peddler
- Retail
- Street vendor
- Street food
- Shahran Bazaar
- Sultan Bazaar
