= Shahran Market =

Ladies' Market in Hyderabad, India

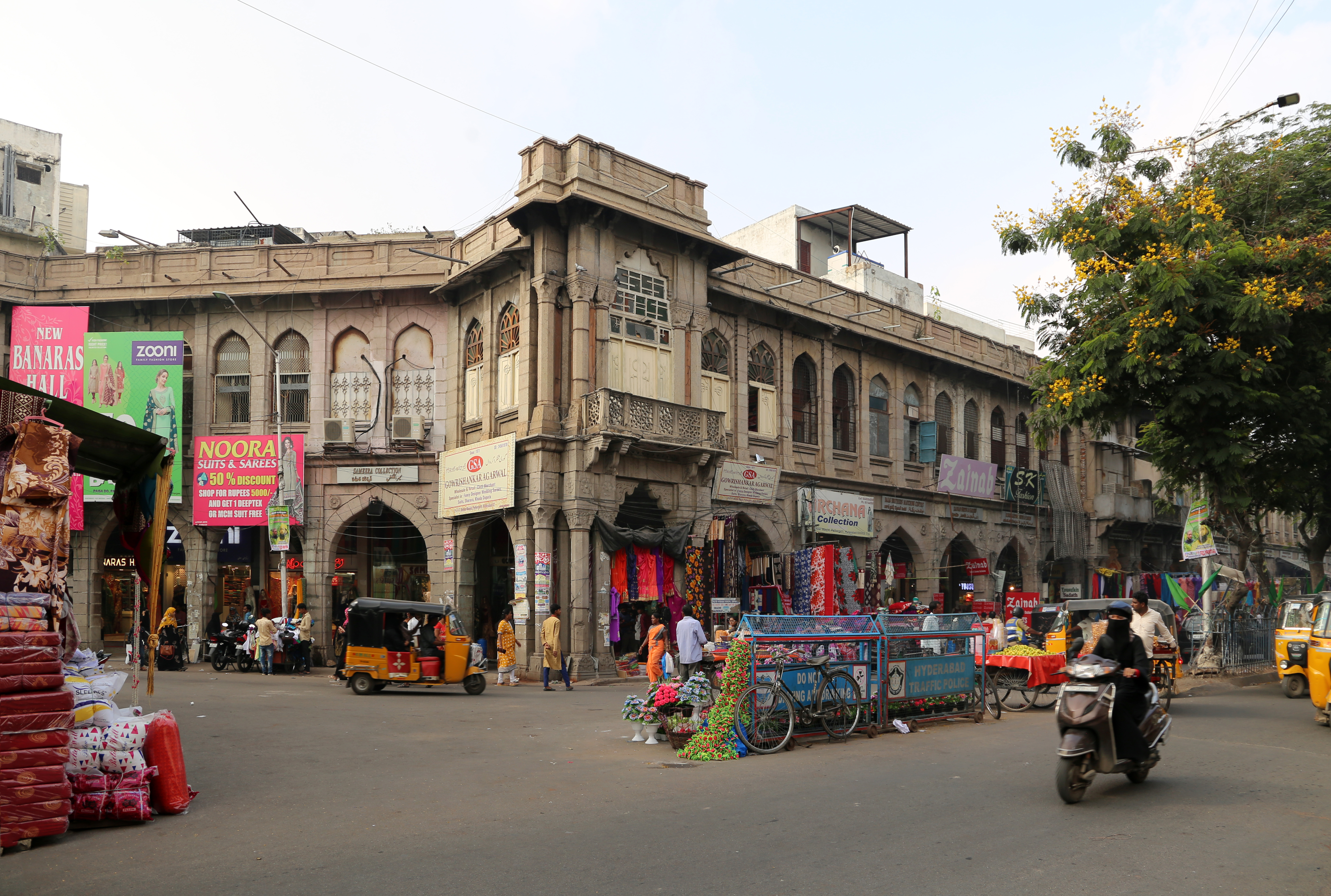

General information
- Location: Hyderabad, India

Shahran Market, also known as Shahran Bazaar, is located in Hyderabad, India near Charminar and Laad Bazaar.

It is a modern market which has stores particularly selling ready to wear burqa and hijab related clothing and material. It is in general a ladies' market. It is considered one of its kind in India. It houses a manufacturing industry which imports raw material and exports manufactured burqa and hijab within India and globally worth of millions of ₹ (Indian rupees).

The market got its name from the adjacent Shahran Restaurant, which is famous for its Hyderabadi Haleem and other foods.

== See also ==
- Arabber
- Bazaar
- Bazaari
- Begum Bazaar
- Chatta Bazaar
- Hawker centre (Asia) a centre where street food is sold
- Haat bazaar
- Laad Bazaar
- Market (place)
- Peddler
- Retail
- Street vendor
- Street food
- Shahran Bazaar
- Sultan Bazaar
