= 1952 Hyderabad State Legislative Assembly election =

Election in Hyderabad, India

- 27 March 1952

All 175 seats in the Hyderabad State Legislative Assembly 88 seats needed for a majority
- Registered: 9,021,680, 12,114,635 (Entitled to vote)
- Turnout: 5,202,214 (42.94%)
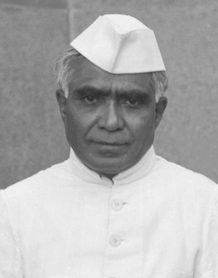

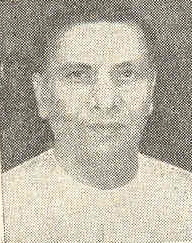
| | Majority party | Minority party |
|---|---|---|
| Leader | Burgula Ramakrishna Rao | Ravi Narayan Reddy |
| Party | INC | PDF |
| Leader's seat | Shadnagar (won) | Bhongir (won) |
| Last election | State did not exist | State did not exist |
| Seats won | 93 | 42 |
| Seat change | New state | New state |
| Popular vote | 2,177,716 | 1,080,092 |
| Percentage | 41.86% | 20.76% |
| Swing | New state | New state |
Chief Minister before election
M. K. Vellodi
IND
Chief Minister after election
Burgula Ramakrishna Rao
INC

Indian administrative divisions, as of 1951

Elections to the Legislative Assembly of the Indian state of Hyderabad were held and Sri Burgula Rama Krishna Rao took oath as First Chief Minister of Hyderabad State on 6 March 1952. 564 candidates competed for the 175 seats in the Assembly. There were 33 two-member constituencies and 109 constituencies single-member constituencies.

== Contestants ==
=== Indian National Congress ===
The Congress Party won a clear majority of the seats in the assembly (93 seats out of 175), with 41.86% of the popular vote. Prominent Congress MLAs from Hyderabad District included Dr. G. S. Melkote and Gopal Rao Ekbote. Kashinath Rao Vaidya, the Congress MLA from Begum Bazar, was elected Speaker of the Assembly after the election.

=== People's Democratic Front ===
The elections were held in the aftermath of the Telangana armed struggle. The communists had called off their guerrilla campaign in October 1951, just few months before the polls. The Communist Party of India was banned in the state at the time, but contested the election under the cover of the People's Democratic Front. The PDF won all of the seats in Nalgonda district.

=== Socialist Party ===
The socialists contested 97 seats. However, the result was a set-back for the party with eleven seats won. The party had refused to cooperate with other parties against the Congress, which could have limited their success. Moreover, the party lacked strong leaders and was organizationally weak in the state. The socialist leader Mahadev Singh lost the seat he contested (Secunderabad).

=== Scheduled Castes Federation ===
The SCF contested the election in alliance with the PDF.

=== Muslim candidates ===
At the time, Muslims represented 7.75% of the population in the state. Out of the main parties, the Indian National Congress had nominated 12 Muslim candidates (6.94% of their candidates), People's Democratic Front had six Muslim candidates (7.69%) whilst the Socialist Party nominated three Muslims (3.09%). Eleven Muslims were elected, below their percentage of the population. Eight of the elected Muslims came from the Indian National Congress, two from the People's Democratic Front (Mohamed Abdur Rahman from Malaket constituency and Syed Akhtar Hussain from Jangaon) and one had contested as an independent (Syed Hasan, Hyderabad City constituency).

== Results ==
=== Summary ===
Summary of results of the 1952 Hyderabad Legislative Assembly election
| Political party | Flag | Seats Contested | Won | % of Seats | Votes | Vote % |
|---|---|---|---|---|---|---|
| Indian National Congress | | 173 | 93 | 53.14 | 21,77,716 | 41.86 |
| Socialist Party | | 97 | 11 | 6.29 | 5,90,209 | 11.35 |
| People's Democratic Front | | 77 | 42 | 24.00 | 10,80,092 | 20.76 |
| Scheduled Castes Federation | | 24 | 5 | 2.86 | 2,66,482 | 5.12 |
| Peasants and Workers Party of India | | 21 | 10 | 5.71 | 2,15,992 | 4.15 |
| Independent | | 136 | 14 | 8.00 | 7,58,318 | 14.58 |
| Total seats | | 175 | Voters | 1,21,14,635 | Turnout | 52,02,214 (42.94%) |

=== Party wise results ===
| Party | No. of candidates | No. of elected | No. of votes | % |
|---|---|---|---|---|
| Bharatiya Jana Sangh | 2 | 0 | 2,328 | 0.04% |
| Akhil Bharatiya Hindu Mahasabha | 3 | 0 | 3,176 | 0.06% |
| Indian National Congress | 173 | 93 | 2,177,716 | 41.86% |
| Kisan Mazdoor Praja Party | 1 | 0 | 4,047 | 0.08% |
| Akhil Bharatiya Ram Rajya Parishad | 7 | 0 | 12,489 | 0.24% |
| Scheduled Caste Federation | 24 | 5 | 266,482 | 5.12% |
| Socialist Party | 97 | 11 | 590,209 | 11.35% |
| All India Republican Party | 6 | 0 | 20,826 | 0.40% |
| Hyderabad State Depressed Classed Association | 6 | 0 | 18,151 | 0.35% |
| Hyderabad State Praja Party | 6 | 0 | 19,452 | 0.37% |
| Independent League | 1 | 0 | 1,800 | 0.03% |
| Peasants and Workers Party of India | 21 | 10 | 215,992 | 4.15% |
| Peoples Democratic Front | 77 | 42 | 1,080,092 | 20.76% |
| United Scheduled Castes Federation | 4 | 0 | 31,136 | 0.60% |
| Independent politician | 136 | 14 | 758,318 | 14.58% |
| Total | 564 | 175 | 5,202,214 | 100% |

=== District wise results ===
Source : Election Commission of India
| District | Seats | | | | | | |
| District | Seats | INC | PDF | SOC | PWP | SCF | IND |
| Hyderabad | 14 | 11 | 2 | —N/a | —N/a | —N/a | 1 |
| Mehboobnagar | 11 | 8 | 1 | —N/a | —N/a | —N/a | 2 |
| Raichur | 11 | 5 | —N/a | —N/a | —N/a | —N/a | 6 |
| Gulbarga | 14 | 13 | —N/a | —N/a | —N/a | —N/a | 1 |
| Bidar | 11 | 11 | —N/a | —N/a | —N/a | —N/a | —N/a |
| Osmanabad | 7 | 4 | —N/a | —N/a | 3 | —N/a | —N/a |
| Bhir | 8 | 4 | 3 | —N/a | 1 | —N/a | —N/a |
| Aurangabad | 11 | 9 | 2 | —N/a | —N/a | —N/a | —N/a |
| Parbhani | 9 | 1 | —N/a | —N/a | 6 | 2 | —N/a |
| Nanded | 9 | 8 | 1 | —N/a | —N/a | —N/a | —N/a |
| Adilabad | 9 | 3 | 1 | 5 | —N/a | —N/a | —N/a |
| Nizamabad | 8 | 5 | —N/a | 3 | —N/a | —N/a | —N/a |
| Medak | 10 | 7 | 2 | —N/a | —N/a | —N/a | 1 |
| Karimnagar | 15 | 2 | 7 | 2 | —N/a | 2 | 2 |
| Warangal | 14 | 2 | 9 | 1 | —N/a | 1 | 1 |
| Nalgonda | 14 | —N/a | 14 | —N/a | —N/a | —N/a | —N/a |
| Total | 175 | 93 | 42 | 11 | 10 | 5 | 14 |

=== List of members ===
The following is the list of members in the assembly who were elected. Election results from constituencies which would later become part of Andhra Pradesh, Mysore State and Bombay state are listed here.

=== Hyderabad State ===
| District | # | Assembly Const. | Winner | Name of Party |
|---|---|---|---|---|
| Hyderabad | 1 | Musheerabad | G. S. Melkote | Indian National Congress |
| Hyderabad | 2 | Chaderghat | Ekbote, Gopal Rao | Indian National Congress |
| Hyderabad | 3 | Begum Bazar | Vaidya, Kashinath Rao | Indian National Congress |
| Hyderabad | 4 | Hyderabad City | Syed Hassan | Independent Politician |
| Hyderabad | 5 | Shalibanda | Massoma Begum | Indian National Congress |
| Hyderabad | 6 | Karwan | Narendra | Indian National Congress |
| Hyderabad | 7 | Somajiguda | Mehdi Nawaz Jung | Indian National Congress |
| Hyderabad | 8 | Malakpet | Abdul Rahman | People's Democratic Front |
| Hyderabad | 9 | Secunderabad (Gen.) | Raju, V.B | Indian National Congress |
| Hyderabad | 10 | Secunderabad (Res.) | Mutyal Rao, J.B. | Indian National Congress |
| Hyderabad | 11 | Ibrahimpatnam (Gen.) | Papi Reddy, K. | People's Democratic Front |
| Hyderabad | 12 | Ibrahimpatnam (Res.) | Gautam, M.B. | Indian National Congress |
| Hyderabad | 13 | Medchal | Gopal Reddy, Varakantam | Indian National Congress |
| Hyderabad | 14 | Shahbad | Konda Venkata Ranga Reddy | Indian National Congress |
| Mahbubnagar | 15 | Pargi | Shah Jehan Begum | Indian National Congress |
| Mahbubnagar | 16 | Shadnagar | Ramakrishna Rao, Burgula | Indian National Congress |
| Mahbubnagar | 17 | Mahbubnagar | Hanumantha Rao, P. | Indian National Congress |
| Mahbubnagar | 18 | Kalwakurthy (Gen.) | Narsing Rao, M. | Indian National Congress |
| Mahbubnagar | 19 | Kalwakurthi (Res.) | Veeraswamy, K.R. | Indian National Congress |
| Mahbubnagar | 20 | Nagarkurnool (Gen.) | Brahma Reddy, B | Independent Politician |
| Mahbubnagar | 21 | Nagarkurnool (Res.) | Ramaswamy, D. | Independent Politician |
| Mahbubnagar | 22 | Kollapur | Anantha Ramachandra Reddy | People's Democratic Front |
| Mahbubnagar | 23 | Wanaparthy | Suravaram Pratap Reddy | Indian National Congress |
| Mahbubnagar | 24 | Makhtal-Atmakur (Gen.) | Shanta Bai | Indian National Congress |
| Mahbubnagar | 25 | Makhtal-Atmakur (Res.) | Basappa, E. | Indian National Congress |
| Raichur | 26 | Alampur-Gadwal (Gen.) | Pulla Reddy, Paga | Indian National Congress |
| Raichur | 27 | Alampur-Gadwal (Res.) | Naganna, K. | Indian National Congress |
| Gulbarga | 45 | Tandur-serum (Note: This constituency was split between two states where Serum (Sedam) was transferred to Mysore state, which is now renamed as Karnataka) and Tandur became a part of Andhra Pradesh (Now Telangana)) | Praneshchari, J.K. | Indian National Congress |
| Gulbarga | 46 | Kodangal (Gen.) | Anant Reddy | Indian National Congress |
| Gulbarga | 47 | Kodangal (Res.) | Veeraswamy, Banam | Indian National Congress |
| Bidar | 57 | Zaheerabad | Yerolker, Gunderao Y. | Indian National Congress |
| Bidar | 59 | Narayankhed | Appa Rao, Ramshetti | Indian National Congress |
| Adilabad | 106 | Nirmal (Gen.) | Gopidi Ganga Reddy | Socialist Party |
| Adilabad | 107 | Nirmal (Res.) | Ganga Ram Devara | Socialist Party |
| Adilabad | 108 | Kinwat | Shrihari | Indian National Congress |
| Adilabad | 109 | Adilabad | Daji Shankar Rao | People's Democratic Front |
| Adilabad | 110 | Asifabad (Res.) | Kasiram, Gangvi | Indian National Congress |
| Adilabad | 111 | Asifabad (Gen.) | Konda Laxman Bapuji | Indian National Congress |
| Adilabad | 112 | Sirpur | Buchaiah, M. | Socialist Party |
| Adilabad | 113 | Luxettipet (Gen.) | Viswanath Rao, Soore | Socialist Party |
| Adilabad | 114 | Luxettipet (Res.) | Rajamallu, Kodati | Socialist Party |
| Nizamabad | 115 | Armur | Rajaram, G | Socialist Party |
| Nizamabad | 116 | Balkonda | Anantha Reddy, K. | Socialist Party |
| Nizamabad | 117 | Dichpalli | Srinivas Rao, Kasuganti | Socialist Party |
| Nizamabad | 118 | Nizamabad | Mohammed Dawar Hussain | Indian National Congress |
| Nizamabad | 119 | Bodhan | Sastri, S.L. | Indian National Congress |
| Nizamabad | 120 | Banswada | Laxmi Bai, Sangam | Indian National Congress |
| Nizamabad | 121 | Kamareddy | Vithal Reddy, G. | Indian National Congress |
| Nizamabad | 122 | Kamareddy | Rama Rao, V | Indian National Congress |
| Medak | 123 | Vicarabad (Gen) | Dr. Chenna Reddy, Marri G | Indian National Congress |
| Medak | 124 | Vicarabad (Res.) | Ramaswamy, Arige | Indian National Congress |
| Medak | 125 | Andole (Gen) | Joshi, Venkat Rajeswar | Indian National Congress |
| Medak | 126 | Andole (Res.) | Laxman Kumar | Indian National Congress |
| Medak | 127 | Narsapur | Ram Reddy, J. | Indian National Congress |
| Medak | 128 | Medak | Venkateswar Rao | Indian National Congress |
| Medak | 129 | Ramayampet | Ganeriwal, Laxminivas | Indian National Congress |
| Medak | 130 | Gajwel | Vasudevu, Pendem | People's Democratic Front |
| Medak | 131 | Siddipet | Guruva Reddy, A. | People's Democratic Front |
| Medak | 132 | Rajgopalpet | Narayan Reddy, K.V. | Independent Politician |
| Karimnagar | 133 | Huzurabad | Narayan Rao, Ponnamaneni | Indian National Congress |
| Karimnagar | 134 | Huzurabad | Venkatesam, J | Socialist Party |
| Karimnagar | 135 | Nustlapur | Singireedy Venkat Reddy | People's Democratic Front |
| Karimnagar | 136 | Karimnagar | Venkat Ram Rao, Ch. | People's Democratic Front |
| Karimnagar | 137 | Elgandal | Damodar Rao, Juvvadi | People's Democratic Front |
| Karimnagar | 138 | Sircilla (Gen) | Rajamani Devi, J.M | Scheduled Castes Federation |
| Karimnagar | 139 | Sircilla (Res.) | Anand Rao, Joganapalli | People's Democratic Front |
| Karimnagar | 140 | Metpalli | Bhomayya, Gangula | Independent Politician |
| Karimnagar | 141 | Jagtial (Gen.) | Malla Reddy, Baddam | Indian National Congress |
| Karimnagar | 142 | Jagtial (Res.) | Rajaram, Butti | Indian National Congress |
| Karimnagar | 143 | Sultanabad | Raj Reddy, A. | People's Democratic Front |
| Karimnagar | 144 | Peddapalle | Muttayya, L | People's Democratic Front |
| Karimnagar | 145 | Kunaram | Kondal Reddy, Mudiganti | Independent Politician |
| Karimnagar | 146 | Parkal | Kesava Reddy, Katangur | Indian National Congress |
| Karimnagar | 147 | Manthani | Sriramulu, Golukota | Scheduled Castes Federation |
| Warangal | 148 | Warangal | Rajalingam, M.S. | Indian National Congress |
| Warangal | 149 | Hasanparthi | Mirza Shukur Baig | Indian National Congress |
| Warangal | 150 | Hanamkonda | Raghava Rao, Pendyala | People's Democratic Front |
| Warangal | 151 | Waradhanapet | Raghava Rao, Pendyala | People's Democratic Front |
| Warangal | 152 | Mahabubabad (Gen.) | Srinivas Rao, Kankanti | People's Democratic Front |
| Warangal | 153 | Mahabubabad (Res.) | Chander Rao, B.M. | Scheduled Castes Federation |
| Warangal | 154 | Pakhal | Gopal Rao, G. | People's Democratic Front |
| Warangal | 155 | Mulug | Hanumanth Rao, G. | People's Democratic Front |
| Warangal | 156 | Yellandu (Gen.) | Narsimha Rao, K.L. | People's Democratic Front |
| Warangal | 157 | Yellandu (Res.) | Vooke Nagaiah | Socialist Party |
| Warangal | 158 | Vemsur | Ramakrishna Rao, Kandimalla | Independent Politician |
| Warangal | 159 | Madhira | Venkaiah, Kondabolu | People's Democratic Front |
| Warangal | 160 | Khammam (Gen.) | Krishnayya, Buggaveeti | People's Democratic Front |
| Warangal | 161 | Khammam (Res.) | Rentala Bala Guru Murthy | People's Democratic Front |
| Nalgonda | 162 | Ippaguda | Vithal Rao | People's Democratic Front |
| Nalgonda | 163 | Jangaon | Syed Akhtar Hussain | People's Democratic Front |
| Nalgonda | 164 | Aler | Kamala Devi, Arutla | People's Democratic Front |
| Nalgonda | 165 | Bhongir | Narayana Reddy, Ravi | People's Democratic Front |
| Nalgonda | 166 | Ramannapet | Ramachandra Reddy, Kattakuri | People's Democratic Front |
| Nalgonda | 167 | Chinnakondur | Venakata Rama Rao, Kanchenrpalli | People's Democratic Front |
| Nalgonda | 168 | Nalgonda (Gen.) | Ram Reddy, Katta | People's Democratic Front |
| Nalgonda | 169 | Nalgonda (Res.) | Laxmayya, P. | People's Democratic Front |
| Nalgonda | 170 | Devarakonda | Anantha Rama Rao, K. | People's Democratic Front |
| Nalgonda | 171 | Peddamungal | Venkat Rama Rao, Akkinapalli | People's Democratic Front |
| Nalgonda | 172 | Huzurnagar (Gen.) | Jai Soorya, N.M. | People's Democratic Front |
| Nalgonda | 173 | Huzurnagar (Res.) | Narasimlu, Talamalla | People's Democratic Front |
| Nalgonda | 174 | Suryapet (Gen.) | Dharma Bhiksham, Bommagani | People's Democratic Front |
| Nalgonda | 175 | Suryapet (Res.) | Uppala Malsur | People's Democratic Front |

=== Mysore State ===
Winner, runner-up, voter turnout, and victory margin in every constituency
| Assembly Constituency | | Turnout | Winner | | | | Runner Up | | | | Margin |
| #k | Names | % | Candidate | Party | Votes | % | Candidate | Party | Votes | % | Margin |
|---|---|---|---|---|---|---|---|---|---|---|---|
| 1 | Raichur | 33.56% | L. K. Shroff | INC | 10,053 | 53.09% | Kallur Siddanna | Independent | 7,205 | 38.05% | 2,848 |
| 2 | Devadurga | 34.95% | Karibasappa Guru Basappa | Independent | 14,274 | 75.76% | Gudihal Hanumanth Rao | INC | 4,566 | 24.24% | 9,708 |
| 3 | Lingsugur | 46.03% | Basangouda | INC | 18,208 | 73.87% | Koppresh Rao Desai | Independent | 4,347 | 17.63% | 13,861 |
| 4 | Manvi | 44.89% | Pampana Gowda | Independent | 18,333 | 74.91% | S. Rama Krishna | INC | 6,139 | 25.09% | 12,194 |
| 5 | Sindhanoor | 44.84% | Shiv Basan Gowda | Independent | 15,358 | 65.00% | Janardan Rao | INC | 6,056 | 25.63% | 9,302 |
| 6 | Gangavathi | 41.74% | Hiremath. K. R | Independent | 11,272 | 57.21% | Keshav Rao Sakharam Pant | INC | 7,321 | 37.16% | 3,951 |
| 7 | Koppal | 48.02% | Mahadevamma Basan Gowda | Independent | 11,110 | 47.07% | Irapanna | INC | 10,946 | 46.38% | 164 |
| 8 | Yelbarga | 52.30% | Ayyangowda | INC | 13,719 | 50.73% | Veerabhadrappa | Independent | 13,322 | 49.27% | 397 |
| 9 | Kushtagi | 53.23% | Andanappa | Independent | 12,674 | 50.18% | Raghuvenderchari | INC | 12,585 | 49.82% | 89 |
| 10 | Shorapur | 36.95% | Kollur Mallappa | INC | 9,428 | 52.81% | Mahant Swami | Independent | 7,217 | 40.43% | 2,211 |
| 11 | Andole Jewargi | 21.60% | Sharangouda Sidramayya | Independent | 9,370 | 74.58% | Dattatrya Rao | INC | 3,193 | 25.42% | 6,177 |
| 12 | Afzalapur | 21.65% | Anna Rao Basappa Ganamukhi | INC | 8,604 | 77.34% | Bhairappa | Independent | 1,928 | 17.33% | 6,676 |
| 13 | Aland | 30.54% | Veerendra Patil | INC | 7,417 | 50.80% | Anna Rao Veerbhadrappa | Independent | 5,536 | 37.92% | 1,881 |
| 14 | Kamalapur | 29.15% | Chandrashekhar S. Patil | INC | 14,455 | 86.61% | Shivalingappa Bandak | Socialist | 2,234 | 13.39% | 12,221 |
| 15 | Gulbarga | 32.62% | Mohd. Ali | INC | 8,772 | 58.32% | Sadasivappa | Socialist | 3,777 | 25.11% | 4,995 |
| 16 | Chitapur | 28.30% | Rudrappa | INC | 13,103 | 83.38% | Shantappa Sangappa Herur | PDF | 2,611 | 16.62% | 10,492 |
| 17 | Chincholi | 26.61% | Ramchari. G | INC | 7,603 | 59.06% | Hari Kishan | RPI | 4,905 | 38.10% | 2,698 |
| 18 | Tandur-serum | 40.05% | J. K. Praneshchari | INC | 16,109 | 64.13% | Sidramappa | Socialist | 5,623 | 22.39% | 10,486 |
| 19 | Yadgir | 35.31% | Jagannath Rao Chandriki | INC | 18,154 | 26.64% | | | | | |
| 19 | Yadgir | 35.31% | Ambadas | INC | 16,282 | 23.89% | | | | | |
| 20 | Shahpur | 25.68% | Virupakshappa | INC | 10,976 | 88.49% | Bhimsen Rao | Socialist | 1,428 | 11.51% | 9,548 |
| 21 | Halsur | 54.96% | Deshpande Bapurao | INC | 15,611 | 56.03% | Jawlgekar Madhavrao Sadasiv Vakil | Socialist | 10,656 | 38.25% | 4,955 |
| 22 | Bhalki | 44.94% | Kamtikar Murlidhar Rao Srinivas Rao | INC | 11,581 | 53.23% | Shankarappa Bashetti Vakil | Socialist | 7,483 | 34.40% | 4,098 |
| 23 | Humnabad | 45.20% | Srinivas Rao | INC | 29,354 | 34.88% | | | | | |
| 23 | Humnabad | 45.20% | Shankar Dev | INC | 29,058 | 34.53% | | | | | |
| 24 | Bidar | 31.98% | Shafiuddin | INC | 10,192 | 62.83% | Veerashetti | Socialist | 3,248 | 20.02% | 6,944 |

=== Bombay State ===
| Assembly Constituency | | Turnout | Winner | | | | Runner Up | | | | Margin |
| #k | Names | % | Candidate | Party | Votes | % | Candidate | Party | Votes | % | Margin |
|---|---|---|---|---|---|---|---|---|---|---|---|
| 1 | Ahmedpur | 51.59% | Nivarthireddy Namdeo Reddy | INC | 12,868 | 57.55% | Manikrao Kishanrao | PDF | 8,047 | 35.99% | 4,821 |
| 2 | Nilanga | 53.85% | Sheshrao Madhavrao | INC | 15,220 | 56.97% | Ekemberkar Bapurao Vithalrao | PWPI | 8,048 | 30.13% | 7,172 |
| 3 | Udgir | 42.48% | Ghonsikar Madhavrao | INC | 31,945 | 68.44% | | | | | |
| 3 | Udgir | 42.48% | Kamble Tulsiram | INC | - | - | | | | | |
| 4 | Paranda | 45.94% | Annasaheb Ramchandra Gavane | PWPI | 20,020 | 75.50% | Mukund Rao | INC | 4,895 | 18.46% | 15,125 |
| 5 | Kalam | 53.71% | Achutrao Yogiraj | PWPI | 15,399 | 55.94% | Apparrao Maruthi Rao | INC | 9,621 | 34.95% | 5,778 |
| 6 | Latur | 46.34% | Vinayak Rao Koratkar | INC | 15,414 | 63.49% | Ramcharan Barma | SCF | 4,633 | 19.08% | 10,781 |
| 7 | Ausa | 60.22% | Devisingh Vanetsingh Chauhan | INC | 17,524 | 63.09% | Digamber Rao Desai | PWPI | 7,240 | 26.06% | 10,284 |
| 8 | Omerga | 58.73% | Gandhi Phoolchand | INC | 18,282 | 54.50% | Sambhogir | PWPI | 10,223 | 30.47% | 8,059 |
| 9 | Osmanabad | 50.23% | Uddhavrao Sahebrao Patil | PWPI | 25,066 | 24.07% | | | | | |
| 9 | Osmanabad | 50.23% | Kallyan Rao | INC | 23,715 | 22.77% | | | | | |
| 10 | Georai | 37.72% | Ram Rao | PDF | 11,696 | 53.78% | Tukaram | INC | 8,891 | 40.88% | 2,805 |
| 11 | Ashti | 35.80% | Rakhamaji Dhondiba Patil | INC | 8,346 | 54.24% | Vithal | PDF | 3,661 | 23.79% | 4,685 |
| 12 | Patoda | 31.19% | Ratanlal Kotecha | INC | 7,714 | 47.22% | Kashinath | PDF | 4,949 | 30.30% | 2,765 |
| 13 | Bhir | 36.18% | Sripat Rao | PDF | 10,452 | 59.15% | Bapurao Kadam | INC | 7,217 | 40.85% | 3,235 |
| 14 | Manjelgaon | 33.70% | Limbaji Muktaji | PDF | 10,635 | 58.28% | Nasik Vasudevrao | INC | 5,142 | 28.18% | 5,493 |
| 15 | Mominabad | 37.84% | Vaman Rao Ram Rao | PWPI | 18,005 | 25.86% | | | | | |
| 15 | Mominabad | 37.84% | Choudhari Dwarka Prashad | INC | 14,810 | 21.27% | | | | | |
| 16 | Kaij | 42.46% | Ramlingswami Mahalingswami | INC | 8,698 | 37.83% | Kashinath Sitaram | PDF | 7,694 | 33.46% | 1,004 |
| 17 | Kannad | 46.06% | Ramgopal | INC | 12,630 | 50.62% | Kakasaheb Alias Tajpal | Socialist | 12,319 | 49.38% | 311 |
| 18 | Aurangabad | 26.07% | Shripad Rao | INC | 8,966 | 60.45% | Govind Das Munnulal Shroff | PDF | 5,867 | 39.55% | 3,099 |
| 19 | Phulmarri | 27.79% | Manikchand Kawalchand Pahade | INC | 5,892 | 50.80% | Tukaram Laxman | PDF | 5,707 | 49.20% | 185 |
| 20 | Sillod | 36.25% | Nago Rao | INC | 8,766 | 49.95% | Kashinath Rao | PDF | 4,301 | 24.51% | 4,465 |
| 21 | Bhokardan | 41.69% | Dhondiraj Kamble | INC | 21,895 | 23.60% | | | | | |
| 21 | Bhokardan | 41.69% | Bhao Rao Dagdu Rao | PDF | 21,024 | 22.66% | | | | | |
| 22 | Jalna | 38.85% | Syed Mohammed Moosavi | INC | 12,583 | 65.79% | Manohar Narayan | PDF | 2,522 | 13.19% | 10,061 |
| 23 | Ambad | 35.49% | Bhagwant Rao | INC | 11,263 | 57.15% | Mohammed Salar | PDF | 4,639 | 23.54% | 6,624 |
| 24 | Paithan-Gangapur | 41.94% | Bapuji Mansing | PDF | 19,764 | 23.41% | | | | | |
| 24 | Paithan-Gangapur | 41.94% | Govind Rao Keroji | INC | 19,209 | 22.75% | | | | | |
| 25 | Vaijapur | 48.49% | Ashatai Waghamare | INC | 14,064 | 56.21% | Lala Binda Prashad | PDF | 4,757 | 19.01% | 9,307 |
| 26 | Pathri | 28.32% | Ram Rao Balkishan Rao | INC | 7,998 | 47.70% | Pandit Rao Hemraj | PWPI | 7,219 | 43.05% | 779 |
| 27 | Partur | 29.81% | Ankush Rao | PWPI | 8,253 | 48.91% | Syed Anisur Rehman | INC | 5,501 | 32.60% | 2,752 |
| 28 | Jintur | 33.91% | Bhujang Rao | PWPI | 12,393 | 69.20% | Sundrarlal Vardhasa | INC | 3,911 | 21.84% | 8,482 |
| 29 | Hingloi | 37.43% | Sham Rao | PWPI | 20,607 | 23.65% | | | | | |
| 29 | Hingloi | 37.43% | Madhaorao | SCF | 15,149 | 17.39% | | | | | |
| 30 | Basmath | 32.84% | Bhagwan Rao | PWPI | 17,218 | 28.38% | | | | | |
| 30 | Basmath | 32.84% | Sham Rao | SCF | 11,096 | 18.29% | | | | | |
| 31 | Parbhani | 39.04% | Vishwas Rao | PWPI | 16,487 | 66.65% | Maqabul Ahmed | INC | 6,608 | 26.71% | 9,879 |
| 32 | Gangakhed | 25.96% | Rang Rao | PWPI | 6,309 | 48.61% | Manohar Rao | INC | 5,510 | 42.45% | 799 |
| 33 | Hadgaon | 38.70% | Waipankar Madhava Rao | PDF | 11,118 | 53.83% | Shankar Rao | INC | 7,237 | 35.04% | 3,881 |
| 34 | Bhokar | 35.03% | Digamber Rao Bindu | INC | 6,512 | 40.22% | Pundalik Rao | PDF | 4,066 | 25.11% | 2,446 |
| 35 | Mudhole | 33.47% | Gopal Shastrideo | INC | 9,127 | 54.33% | Jivan Rao | PDF | 4,522 | 26.92% | 4,605 |
| 36 | Biloli | 30.85% | Narayanrao Narsing Rao | INC | 10,142 | 57.24% | Anant Kashinath Bhale Rao | PDF | 2,735 | 15.44% | 7,407 |
| 37 | Deglur | 27.28% | Jaywant Rao | INC | 19,395 | 33.17% | | | | | |
| 37 | Deglur | 27.28% | Ganpath Rao Manikrao | INC | 16,394 | 28.04% | | | | | |
| 38 | Kandhar | 25.67% | Govind Rao Narsing Rao | INC | 14,159 | 30.40% | | | | | |
| 38 | Kandhar | 25.67% | Madhaw Rao Sawai | INC | 13,973 | 30.00% | | | | | |
| 39 | Nanded | 30.81% | Raghwan Rao | INC | 9,663 | 54.54% | Vithalrao Devidasrao Deshpande | PDF | 5,613 | 31.68% | 4,050 |

== State Reorganization and Merger ==
On 1 November 1956, under States Reorganisation Act, 1956, Hyderabad State was merged into Andhra State to form a single state United Andhra Pradesh. The districts of Raichur, Bidar and Gulbarga were transferred to Mysore State, while Marathwada district was transferred to Bombay State.

== See also ==
- 1951–52 elections in India
- 1955 Andhra Pradesh Legislative Assembly election
- 1957 Andhra Pradesh Legislative Assembly election
