= Channur Assembly constituency =

Constituency of the Andhra Pradesh legislative assembly in India

Channur
- Former constituency for the Andhra Pradesh Legislative Assembly

Constituency details
- Country: India
- Region: South India
- State: Andhra Pradesh
- Established: 1955
- Abolished: 2008
- Total electors: 179,700
- Reservation: None

Channur Assembly constituency was an assembly constituency in the India state of Andhra Pradesh.

== Members of the Legislative Assembly ==
Election	Member	Party
1957	S. Venkata Krishna Prasad Rao	People's Democratic Front
1962	Nemarugommula Yethiraja Rao	Socialist Party of India
1967	N. R. Devi	Indian National Congress
1972	Kundoor Madhusudhan Reddy	Independent politician
1978	Neramugomula Yethiraja Rao	Indian National Congress
1983	Neramugomula Yethiraja Rao	Indian National Congress
1985	Neramugomula Yethiraja Rao	Telugu Desam Party
1989	Neramugomula Yethiraja Rao	Telugu Desam Party
1994	Neramugomula Yethiraja Rao	Telugu Desam Party
1999	Dr. Nemarugommula Sudhakar Rao	Telugu Desam Party
2004	Dr. Dugyala Srinivasa Rao	Bharat Rashtra Samithi

Andhra Pradesh

== Election results ==
=== Assembly Election 2004 ===
2004 Andhra Pradesh Legislative Assembly election : Channur
Party	Candidate	Votes	%	±%
BRS	Dr. Dugyala Srinivasa Rao	67,912	50.56%	New
TDP	Dr. Nemarugommula Sudhakar Rao	59,821	44.53%	▼5.88
KSP	Venkanna Bandu	2,070	1.54%	New
BSP	Mula Kondaiah	1,817	1.35%	New
Independent	Praveen Kumar Nemarugommula	1,807	1.35%	New
Independent	Gatla Laxminarayana	1,085	0.81%	New
Margin of victory		8,091	6.02%	▲2.45
Turnout		134,343	74.76%	▼1.64
Total valid votes		134,331		
Rejected ballots		12	0.01%	▼2.70
Registered electors		179,700		▲10.22
BRS gain from TDP		Swing	▲0.15	

=== Assembly Election 1999 ===
1999 Andhra Pradesh Legislative Assembly election : Channur
Party	Candidate	Votes	%	±%
TDP	Dr. Nemarugommula Sudhakar Rao	61,087	50.41%	▼17.27
INC	Madhusudan Reddy Kunduru	56,759	46.84%	▲19.03
Marxist Communist Party of India (S.S.Srivastava)	Macha Bixapathy	1,348	1.11%	New
Ajeya Bharat Party	Gottimukkula Prabhakar Reddy	961	0.79%	New
Margin of victory		4,328	3.57%	▼36.29
Turnout		124,557	76.40%	▲2.33
Total valid votes		121,180		
Rejected ballots		3,377	2.71%	▲0.21
Registered electors		163,032		▲3.45
TDP hold		Swing	▼17.27	

=== Assembly Election 1994 ===
1994 Andhra Pradesh Legislative Assembly election : Channur
Party	Candidate	Votes	%	±%
TDP	Neramugomula Yethiraja Rao	77,024	67.68%	▲14.46
INC	M. Jagannadham	31,655	27.81%	▼16.76
BJP	V. Vijayapal Reddy	1,656	1.46%	New
Independent	Gundeti Raja Ram	1,004	0.88%	New
Margin of victory		45,369	39.86%	▲31.21
Turnout		116,728	74.07%	▼4.19
Total valid votes		113,809		
Rejected ballots		2,919	2.50%	▼0.90
Registered electors		157,588		▲12.30
TDP hold		Swing	▲14.46	

=== Assembly Election 1989 ===
1989 Andhra Pradesh Legislative Assembly election : Channur
Party	Candidate	Votes	%	±%
TDP	Neramugomula Yethiraja Rao	56,453	53.22%	▼1.05
INC	K. Madhusudhan Reddy	47,273	44.57%	▲0.28
Independent	K. Latchi Reddy	1,094	1.03%	New
BSP	A. Abdul	879	0.83%	New
Margin of victory		9,180	8.65%	▼1.34
Turnout		109,810	78.26%	▲0.27
Total valid votes		106,072		
Rejected ballots		3,738	3.40%	▲1.43
Registered electors		140,322		▲22.27
TDP hold		Swing	▼1.05	

=== Assembly Election 1985 ===
1985 Andhra Pradesh Legislative Assembly election : Channur
Party	Candidate	Votes	%	±%
TDP	Neramugomula Yethiraja Rao	47,622	54.27%	New
INC	Kundur Venkatrama Reddy	38,858	44.29%	▲3.76
Independent	Narati Venkat Narsu	899	1.02%	New
Margin of victory		8,764	9.99%	▼0.16
Turnout		89,510	77.99%	▲2.67
Total valid votes		87,745		
Rejected ballots		1,765	1.97%	▼0.89
Registered electors		114,765		▲15.60
TDP gain from INC		Swing	▲13.74	

=== Assembly Election 1983 ===
1983 Andhra Pradesh Legislative Assembly election : Channur
Party	Candidate	Votes	%	±%
INC	Neramugomula Yethiraja Rao	29,442	40.53%	▼1.15
Independent	Kundoor Madhusudhan Reddy	22,069	30.38%	New
Independent	Nukala Vrushaseana Reddy	9,999	13.77%	New
CPI	Mannur Venkataiah	9,850	13.56%	New
Independent	Cheekati Ram Murthy	667	0.92%	New
Independent	Pujari Narayana	607	0.84%	New
Margin of victory		7,373	10.15%	▲3.11
Turnout		74,774	75.32%	▲0.21
Total valid votes		72,634		
Rejected ballots		2,140	2.86%	▼0.87
Registered electors		99,276		▲4.40
INC hold		Swing	▼1.15	

=== Assembly Election 1978 ===
1978 Andhra Pradesh Legislative Assembly election : Channur
Party	Candidate	Votes	%	±%
INC	Neramugomula Yethiraja Rao	28,658	41.68%	▼6.59
JP	Nayani Chittaranjan Reddy	23,816	34.64%	New
INC(I)	Kondapally Gopala Kishna Rao	15,712	22.85%	New
Independent	Baki Vidya Kumar	569	0.83%	New
Margin of victory		4,842	7.04%	▲3.58
Turnout		71,419	75.11%	▲5.24
Total valid votes		68,755		
Rejected ballots		2,664	3.73%	▲3.73
Registered electors		95,091		▲30.30
INC gain from Independent		Swing	▼10.05	

=== Assembly Election 1972 ===
1972 Andhra Pradesh Legislative Assembly election : Channur
Party	Candidate	Votes	%	±%
Independent	Kundoor Madhusudhan Reddy	25,654	51.73%	New
INC	Nemarugommulavimala Devi	23,940	48.27%	▼6.67
Margin of victory		1,714	3.46%	▼10.35
Turnout		50,990	69.87%	▼8.00
Total valid votes		49,594		
Registered electors		72,978		▲11.46
Independent gain from INC		Swing	▼3.21	

=== Assembly Election 1967 ===
1967 Andhra Pradesh Legislative Assembly election : Channur
Party	Candidate	Votes	%	±%
INC	N. R. Devi	26,990	54.94%	▲17.50
CPI(M)	N. Narsimhulu	20,204	41.13%	New
SWA	K. C. Rao	1,931	3.93%	New
Margin of victory		6,786	13.81%	▼11.32
Turnout		50,984	77.87%	▲2.10
Total valid votes		49,125		
Registered electors		65,476		▲3.05
INC gain from SOC		Swing	▼7.62	

=== Assembly Election 1962 ===
1962 Andhra Pradesh Legislative Assembly election : Channur
Party	Candidate	Votes	%	±%
SOC	Nemarugommula Yethiraja Rao	28,860	62.56%	New
INC	Muraharisetty Venkatramiah	17,269	37.44%	▼11.36
Margin of victory		11,591	25.13%	▲22.73
Turnout		48,141	75.77%	▲15.90
Total valid votes		46,129		
Registered electors		63,538		▲13.51
SOC gain from PDF		Swing	▲11.36	

=== Assembly Election 1957 ===
1957 Andhra Pradesh Legislative Assembly election : Channur
Party	Candidate	Votes	%	±%
PDF	S. Venkata Krishna Prasad Rao	17,158	51.20%	New
INC	N. Yethi Raja Rao	16,355	48.80%	New
Margin of victory		803	2.40%	
Turnout		33,513	59.87%	
Total valid votes		33,513		
Registered electors		55,976		
PDF win (new seat)				
