= Madina building, Hyderabad =

Madina building
- Neighbourhood
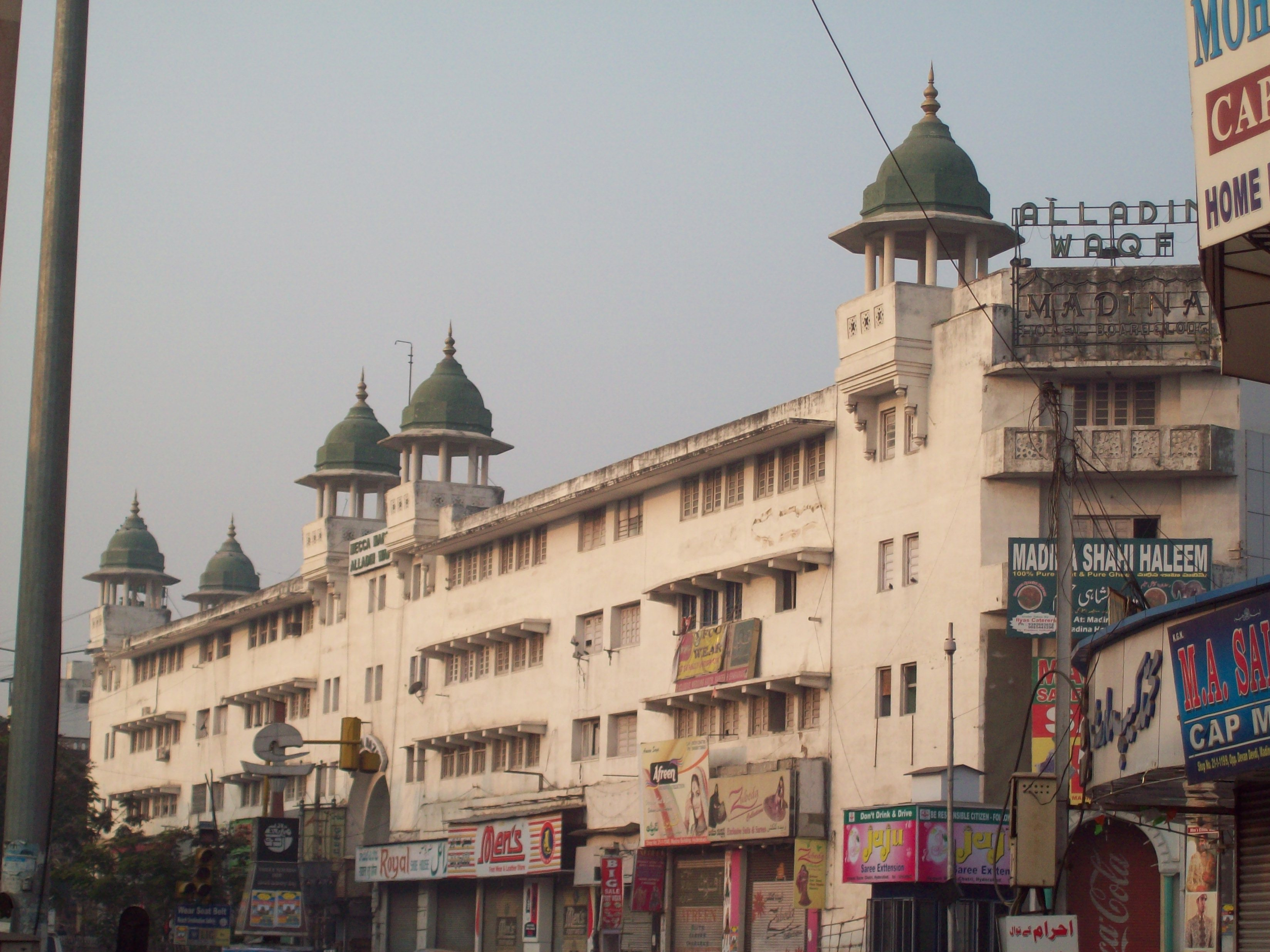
- Madina building

- Location in Telangana, India Madina building (Telangana) Madina building (India)
- Coordinates: 17°22′N 78°30′E
- Country: India
- State: Telangana
- District: Hyderabad
- Metro: Hyderabad

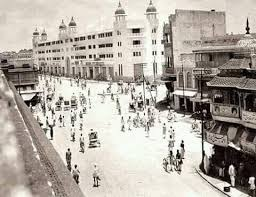
Madina Building, c. 1938.

Madina building is Waqf property aimed to serve Hajj pilgrims built by the 7th Nizam of Hyderabad Deccan.

== History ==
Madina Building was constructed with the purpose to support the Residents of Madina(a holy city for Muslims in Saudi Arabia). The rent of this commercial and Residential building was distributed among the residents of Madina Munawara in Hejaz in olden days. The major contributor is Nawab Alladin. There are around 200 shops and 100 flats in this building.

== Commercial area ==
Madina building is the oldest commercial suburbs of Hyderabad, India. It is very close to the historic Charminar. This is a major traditional retail street in Hyderabad. Madina building is connected with the neighboring commercial areas like Pathargatti, Shehran, Charminar and Laad Bazar which houses shops specially for women and Brides, and daily around millions of business deals are done in this regions. Most of the bridal dress are Exported to neighboring states, United States, Europe, Middle East, Pakistan, Bangladesh and many other countries. During the Holy Month of Ramzan you could hardly find the space to stand otherwise the area is completely crowded and locked with the Retail shoppers during Day and Night.

The street houses many restaurants which provide city base cuisine food in the menu, there are some popular Hyderabadi restaurants like Madina hotel which serves all the popular Hyderabadi dishes. They are very popular for their Hyderabadi Haleem which is served during the Holy month of Ramzan.

=== Madina Hotel ===
Madina Hotel, a restaurant which operates out of the building was inaugurated in 1947.

== Transport ==
The buses are run by TSRTC which connect it to all parts of the city. The closest MMTS Train station is at Yakutpura or Malakpet.
