= Kashinath Rao Vaidya =

Indian politician

Speaker of the Hyderabad State Legislative Assembly
- In office 1952–1956
- Constituency: Begum Bazar

Member of the Hyderabad State Legislative Assembly
- In office 1952–1959
- Constituency: Begum Bazar

Personal details
- Died: Hyderabad, India
- Party: Indian National Congress
- Profession: Lawyer

Kashinath Rao Vaidya (died 13 March 1959, Hyderabad) was an Indian lawyer and politician. Vaidya was elected to the Hyderabad State Legislative Assembly in the 1952 election as the Indian National Congress candidate from the Begum Bazar constituency. Vaidya obtained 15,794 votes (72.48% of the votes in the constituency). Following the election, he was elected speaker of the Assembly, a position he held until 1956.

Vaidya died in Hyderabad on 13 March 1959.
