= Paithan Gangapur Assembly constituency =

Constituency of the Maharashtra legislative assembly in India

Paithan Gangapur
- Former constituency for the Maharashtra Legislative Assembly

Constituency details
- Country: India
- Region: Western India
- State: Maharashtra
- Established: 1951
- Abolished: 1955
- Total electors: 1,00,649
- Reservation: SC

Paithan Gangapur Assembly constituency was an assembly constituency in the India state of Maharashtra. After the 1955 Delimitation act, it was split into Vaijapur and Paithan constituencies.

== Members of the Legislative Assembly ==
Election	Member	Party
1952	Bapuji Mansing	People's Democratic Front
1952	Govind Rao Keroji	Indian National Congress

== Election results ==
=== Assembly Election 1952 ===
1952 Hyderabad State Legislative Assembly election : Paithan Gangapur
Party	Candidate	Votes	%	±%
PDF	Bapuji Mansing	19,764	23.41%	New
INC	Govind Rao Keroji	19,209	22.75%	New
INC	Gulabchand Balchand	18,920	22.41%	New
SCF	Namdeo Deoji	14,747	17.47%	New
Independent	Pandharinath Tukaram	6,450	7.64%	New
Socialist	Baji Rao	3,350	3.97%	New
PWPI	Shankar Rao Nanaji	1,993	2.36%	New
Margin of victory		844	1.00%	
Turnout		84,433	41.94%	
Total valid votes		84,433		
Registered electors		100,649		
PDF win (new seat)				
