= Bhir Assembly constituency =

Constituency of the Maharashtra legislative assembly in India

Bhir
- Former constituency for the Maharashtra Legislative Assembly

Constituency details
- Country: India
- Region: Western India
- State: Maharashtra
- Established: 1952
- Abolished: 1978
- Total electors: 106,801

Bhir Assembly constituency was an assembly constituency in the India state of Maharashtra.

== Members of the Legislative Assembly ==
Election	Member	Party
1952	Sripat Rao	People's Democratic Front
1957	Shantabai Ratanlal	Indian National Congress
1962	Kashinath Tatyaba	Communist Party of India
1967	S. B. Chavre	Indian National Congress
1972	Deshmukh S. Syed Ali	Indian National Congress

== Election results ==
=== Assembly Election 1972 ===
1972 Maharashtra Legislative Assembly election : Bhir
Party	Candidate	Votes	%	±%
INC	Deshmukh S. Syed Ali	19,029	44.67%	▲17.66
Independent	Dhepe M. Rudrappa	10,977	25.77%	New
CPI	Ather Babar Ahmed Husain	9,674	22.71%	▼2.43
Independent	Dhande Sadashiv Patilbuwa	1,967	4.62%	New
RPI	Sable Rajaram Genaji	951	2.23%	New
Margin of victory		8,052	18.90%	▲17.03
Turnout		44,567	41.73%	▼10.60
Total valid votes		42,598		
Registered electors		106,801		▲16.51
INC hold		Swing	▲17.66	

=== Assembly Election 1967 ===
1967 Maharashtra Legislative Assembly election : Bhir
Party	Candidate	Votes	%	±%
INC	S. B. Chavre	11,648	27.01%	▼9.77
CPI	K. T. Hadhav	10,841	25.14%	▼26.76
Independent	K. S. Kshirsagar	10,637	24.67%	New
Independent	M. R. Dhepe	7,334	17.01%	New
Independent	W. B. Butt	2,664	6.18%	New
Margin of victory		807	1.87%	▼13.25
Turnout		47,970	52.33%	▲4.99
Total valid votes		43,124		
Registered electors		91,663		▲13.08
INC gain from CPI		Swing	▼24.89	

=== Assembly Election 1962 ===
1962 Maharashtra Legislative Assembly election : Bhir
Party	Candidate	Votes	%	±%
CPI	Kashinath Tatyaba	18,609	51.90%	New
INC	Shantabai Ratanlal	13,186	36.78%	▼15.72
Independent	Rajaram Jairam	1,489	4.15%	New
Independent	Barayan Ramrao	1,302	3.63%	New
Independent	Dharma Hariba	1,269	3.54%	New
Margin of victory		5,423	15.12%	▲10.13
Turnout		38,372	47.34%	▲13.16
Total valid votes		35,855		
Registered electors		81,060		▲19.00
CPI gain from INC		Swing	▼0.60	

=== Assembly Election 1957 ===
1957 Bombay State Legislative Assembly election : Bhir
Party	Candidate	Votes	%	±%
INC	Shantabai Ratanlal	12,224	52.50%	▲11.65
PWPI	Sripatrao Limbaji	11,061	47.50%	New
Margin of victory		1,163	4.99%	▼13.32
Turnout		23,285	34.18%	▼2.00
Total valid votes		23,285		
Registered electors		68,116		▲39.46
INC gain from PDF		Swing	▼6.65	

=== Assembly Election 1952 ===
1952 Hyderabad State Legislative Assembly election : Bhir
Party	Candidate	Votes	%	±%
PDF	Sripat Rao	10,452	59.15%	New
INC	Bapurao Kadam	7,217	40.85%	New
Margin of victory		3,235	18.31%	
Turnout		17,669	36.18%	
Total valid votes		17,669		
Registered electors		48,842		
PDF win (new seat)				
