= Mudhol, Bombay State Assembly constituency =

Constituency of the Maharashtra legislative assembly in India

Mudhol
- Former constituency for the State Legislative Assembly

Constituency details
- Country: India
- State: Bombay state
- Established: 1951
- Abolished: 1955
- Total electors: 50,189
- Reservation: None

Mudhol Assembly constituency was an assembly constituency in the India state of Bombay state.

== Members of the Legislative Assembly ==
Election	Member	Party
1952	Gopal Shastrideo	Indian National Congress

== Election results ==
=== Assembly Election 1952 ===
1952 Hyderabad State Legislative Assembly election : Mudhol
Party	Candidate	Votes	%	±%
INC	Gopal Shastrideo	9,127	54.33%	New
PDF	Jivan Rao	4,522	26.92%	New
RRP	H. S. Chenoy	3,150	18.75%	New
Margin of victory		4,605	27.41%	
Turnout		16,799	33.47%	
Total valid votes		16,799		
Registered electors		50,189		
INC win (new seat)				
