= Patoda Assembly constituency =

Constituency of the Maharashtra legislative assembly in India

Patoda
- Former constituency for the State Legislative Assembly

Constituency details
- Country: India
- State: Bombay State
- Established: 1951
- Abolished: 1955
- Total electors: 52,382

Patoda Assembly constituency was an assembly constituency in the India state of Bombay State.

== Members of the Legislative Assembly ==
Election	Member	Party
1952	Ratanlal Kotecha	Indian National Congress

== Election results ==
=== Assembly Election 1952 ===
1952 Hyderabad State Legislative Assembly election : Patoda
Party	Candidate	Votes	%	±%
INC	Ratanlal Kotecha	7,714	47.22%	New
PDF	Kashinath	4,949	30.30%	New
Independent	Mohaniraj	1,896	11.61%	New
Independent	Madhaorao	1,777	10.88%	New
Margin of victory		2,765	16.93%	
Turnout		16,336	31.19%	
Total valid votes		16,336		
Registered electors		52,382		
INC win (new seat)				
