= Aurangabad, Maharashtra Assembly constituency =

Constituency of the Maharashtra legislative assembly in India

Aurangabad
- Former constituency for the Maharashtra Legislative Assembly

Constituency details
- Country: India
- Region: Western India
- State: Maharashtra
- Established: 1957
- Abolished: 1962
- Total electors: 63,954

Aurangabad Assembly constituencywas an assembly constituency in the India state of Maharashtra.

== Members of the Legislative Assembly ==
Election	Member	Party
1952	Shripad Rao	Indian National Congress
1957	Mir Mahmood Ali	Indian National Congress
1962	Zakaria Rafiq Balimy	Indian National Congress

== Election results ==
=== Assembly Election 1962 ===
1962 Maharashtra Legislative Assembly election : Aurangabad
Party	Candidate	Votes	%	±%
INC	Zakaria Rafiq Balimy	18,767	55.89%	▼6.88
Independent	Govinddas Mannulal	14,813	44.11%	New
Margin of victory		3,954	11.77%	▼22.37
Turnout		35,814	56.00%	▲24.02
Total valid votes		33,580		
Registered electors		63,954		▲22.58
INC hold		Swing	▼6.88	

=== Assembly Election 1957 ===
1957 Bombay State Legislative Assembly election : Aurangabad
Party	Candidate	Votes	%	±%
INC	Mir Mahmood Ali	10,475	62.77%	▲2.32
PWPI	Kazi Saleemuddin	4,778	28.63%	New
Independent	Radhakrishna	1,434	8.59%	New
Margin of victory		5,697	34.14%	▲13.25
Turnout		16,687	31.98%	▲5.91
Total valid votes		16,687		
Registered electors		52,175		▼8.28
INC hold		Swing	▲2.32	

=== Assembly Election 1952 ===
1952 Hyderabad State Legislative Assembly election : Aurangabad
Party	Candidate	Votes	%	±%
INC	Shripad Rao	8,966	60.45%	New
PDF	Govind Das Munnulal Shroff	5,867	39.55%	New
Margin of victory		3,099	20.89%	
Turnout		14,833	26.07%	
Total valid votes		14,833		
Registered electors		56,886		
INC win (new seat)				
