= Syed Hassan Abidi =

Syed Hassan Abidi is an Indian politician. Syed Hassan hailed from a prominent Shia family from Hyderabad. He was elected from the Hyderabad City constituency in the 1952 Hyderabad Legislative Assembly election as an independent candidate. His candidature was supported by the communist People's Democratic Front. He obtained 10,772 votes (46.89%) of the votes in the constituency.

When the boundaries of the assembly constituencies were changed, the Shia-dominated areas of Hyderabad became part of the Malakpet constituency. Syed Hassan contested the Malakpet constituency as an independent (without communist support) in the 1957 and 1962 Andhra Pradesh assembly elections. In 1957 he finished in third place, with 3,258 votes (20.38% of the votes in the constituency). In 1962 he again finished in third place, obtaining 1,908 votes (8.29%).
