= Mominabad Assembly constituency =

Constituency of the Maharashtra legislative assembly in India

Mominabad
- Former constituency for the State Legislative Assembly

Constituency details
- Country: India
- State: Bombay State
- Established: 1951
- Abolished: 1955
- Total electors: 91,989

Mominabad Assembly constituency was an assembly constituency in the India state of Bombay State.

== Members of the Legislative Assembly ==
| Election | Member | Party |
|---|---|---|
| 1952 | Vaman Rao Ram Rao | Peasants and Workers Party of India |
| 1952 | Choudhari Dwarka Prashad | Indian National Congress |

== Election results ==
=== Assembly Election 1952 ===
1952 Hyderabad State Legislative Assembly election : Mominabad
| Party | Candidate | Votes | % | ±% |
|---|---|---|---|---|
| PWPI | Vaman Rao Ram Rao | 18,005 | 25.86% | New |
| INC | Choudhari Dwarka Prashad | 14,810 | 21.27% | New |
| INC | Chapalgaonker Purshottam Rao | 14,296 | 20.53% | New |
| SCF | Ark Vithal Rao | 13,047 | 18.74% | New |
| PDF | Namdeo Rao | 9,461 | 13.59% | New |
| Margin of victory | | 3,709 | 5.33% | |
| Turnout | | 69,619 | 37.84% | |
| Total valid votes | | 69,619 | | |
| Registered electors | | 91,989 | | |
| PWPI win (new seat) | | | | |
