= 1957 Andhra Pradesh Legislative Assembly election =

- 25 February 1957

Additional 105 seats in the Andhra Pradesh Legislative Assembly
- Registered: 5,561,345, 7,558,880 (Entitled to vote)
- Turnout: 3,603,585 (47.67%)
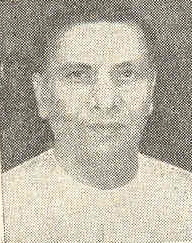
	Majority party	Minority party
	INC
Leader	Mogaligundla Baga Reddy	Raavi Narayana Reddy
Party	INC	PDF
Leader's seat	Zahirabad (won)	Bhongir (won)
Last election	State did not exist	State did not exist
Seats won	68	22
Seat change	New state	New state
Popular vote	1,707,364	927,333
Percentage	47.38%	25.73%
Swing	New state	New state
- 1957 Andhra Pradesh Legislative Assembly election results
Chief Minister before election
Office established
Chief Minister after election
Neelam Sanjiva Reddy
INC

The 1957 Andhra Pradesh Legislative Assembly election were held on 25 February 1957. 319 candidates contested for the 85 constituencies in the Assembly. There were 20 two-member constituencies and 65 single-member constituencies. The members of the first assembly (1955–62) who were elected in the 1955 election were allowed a seven-year term. That is to say, in 1957, elections were conducted in the newly added region of Telangana alone and then in 1962, general elections were held for the state as a whole.

== State reorganisation ==
On November 1, 1956, Andhra State was merged with Hyderabad State under the States Reorganisation Act, 1956, to form a single state, Andhra Pradesh. The divisions of Aurangabad (Aurangabad, Bhir, Nander, Parbhani), Gulbarga (Bidar, Gulbarga, Osmanabad, Raichur) were detached from Hyderabad State while merging with Andhra State. Also, the Siruguppa taluk, the Bellary taluk, the Hospet taluk, and a small area of the Mallapuram sub-taluk were transferred from Mysore State to Andhra Pradesh. The Aurangabad division and Osmanabad district of the Gulbarga division were transferred to Bombay State, while the remaining Gulbarga division (excluding Osmanabad district) was transferred to Mysore State.

== Results ==
Party	Votes	%	Seats		
Party	Votes	%	Hold	Won	Total
Indian National Congress	1,707,364	47.38	119	68	187
People's Democratic Front	927,333	25.73	15	22	37
Krishikar Lok Party	0	0.00	22	0	22
Praja Socialist Party	203,453	5.65	13	1	14
Praja Party	28,968	0.80	5	1	6
Scheduled Caste Federation	20,289	0.56	0	1	1
Peasants and Workers Party	37,271	1.03	0	0	0
Bharatiya Jana Sangh	5,809	0.16	0	0	0
Independents	673,098	18.68	22	12	34
Total	3,603,585	100.00	196	105	301

=== District wise results ===
District	Seats				
District	Seats	INC	PDF	IND	OTH
Mahabubnagar	14	11	0	2	1
Hyderabad	18	17	0	1	0
Medak	11	7	1	2	1
Nizamabad	8	6	0	2	0
Adilabad	8	4	1	2	1
Karimnagar	13	5	6	3	0
Warangal	12	9	3	0	0
Khammam	7	5	2	0	0
Nalgonda	12	3	9	0	0
Total	105	68	22	12	3

== List of Assembly constituencies and winners ==
#	Constituency	Reserved for (SC/ST/None)	Member	Party
Mahabubnagar
1	Kalwakurthy	SC	Santa Bai	Indian National Congress
1	Kalwakurthy	SC	Dr. Naganna	Indian National Congress
2	Kollapur	None	M. Narsing Rao	Indian National Congress
3	Alampur	None	Jayalaxmi Devamma	Indian National Congress
4	Gadwal	None	D. K. Satya Reddy	Independent
5	Wanaparthy	None	Padmanabha Reddy	Indian National Congress
6	Atmakur	None	Murlidhar Reddi	Indian National Congress
7	Makthal	SC	Basappa	Indian National Congress
7	Makthal	SC	Bannappa	Independent
8	Kodangal	None	Achuta Reddy	Indian National Congress
9	Mahbubnagar	None	Eguru Chinnappa	Praja Party
10	Shadnagar	None	Shahjahan Begum	Indian National Congress
11	Nagarkurnool	SC	Mahendranath	Indian National Congress
11	Nagarkurnool	SC	Janardhan Reddy	Indian National Congress
Hyderabad
12	Musheerabad	None	K. Seethiah Gupta	Indian National Congress
13	Sultan Bazar	None	Vasudev Krishnaji Naik	Indian National Congress
14	Begum Bazar	None	J. V. Narsing Rao	Indian National Congress
15	Asafnagar	None	V. B. Raju	Indian National Congress
16	High Court	None	Gopal Rao Ekbote	Indian National Congress
17	Malakpet	None	Mir Ahmed Ali Khan	Indian National Congress
18	Yakutpura	None	Shabuddin Ahmed Khan	Indian National Congress
19	Pathergatti	None	Masooma Begum	Indian National Congress
20	Secunderabad City	None	K. Satya Narayana	Indian National Congress
21	Secunderabad Cantonment	None	B. V. Gurumurthy	Indian National Congress
22	Jubilee Hills	SC	Sumitra Devi	Indian National Congress
22	Jubilee Hills	SC	Nawab Mehdi Nawaz Jung	Indian National Congress
23	Ibrahimpatam	None	M. N. Laxmi Narsiah	Indian National Congress
24	Shahabad	None	V. Rama Rao	Indian National Congress
24	Shahabad	None	Konda Venkat Ranga Reddy	Indian National Congress
25	Pargi	None	Jagan Mohan Reddy	Independent
26	Vikarabad	None	Ariga Ramaswamy	Indian National Congress
26	Vikarabad	None	Marri Chenna Reddy	Indian National Congress
Medak
27	Zahirabad	None	M. Baga Reddy	Indian National Congress
28	Narayankhed	None	Appa Rao Shetkar	Indian National Congress
29	Andole	None	Baswa Maniah	Independent
30	Sangareddy	SC	Kishtamachari	Independent
30	Sangareddy	SC	Antiah	Scheduled Castes Federation
31	Narsapur	None	Gundam Veeriah	Indian National Congress
32	Medak	None	Venkateswar Rao	Indian National Congress
33	Gazwel	SC	R. Narsimha Reddy	Indian National Congress
33	Gazwel	SC	J. B. Muthyal Rao	Indian National Congress
34	Dommat	None	Anantha Reddy	People's Democratic Front
35	Siddipet	None	P. V. Rajeswar Rao	Indian National Congress
Nizamabad
36	Kamareddy	SC	T. N. Sada Laxmi	Indian National Congress
36	Kamareddy	SC	Venkatrama Reddy	Indian National Congress
37	Banswada	None	Seetakumari	Indian National Congress
38	Jukkal	None	Madhav Rao	Independent
39	Bodhan	None	Srinivasa Rao	Independent
40	Nizamabad	None	Dawar Hussain Mohammed	Indian National Congress
41	Armoor	None	T. Anjaiah	Indian National Congress
42	Balkonda	None	Ranga Reddy	Indian National Congress
Adilabad
43	Mudhole	None	Gopidi Ganga Reddy	Independent
44	Nirmal	None	Muthiam Reddy	Independent
45	Adilabad	None	Rangnath Rao	People's Democratic Front
46	Asifabad	ST	G. Narayan Reddy	Indian National Congress
46	Asifabad	ST	Kashi Ram	Indian National Congress
47	Luxettipet	None	G. V. Pitambar Rao	Indian National Congress
48	Sirpur	SC	Venkata Swamy	Indian National Congress
48	Sirpur	SC	K. Raja Mallu	Praja Socialist Party
Karimnagar
49	Manthani	None	P. V. Narsimha Rao	Indian National Congress
50	Sultanabad	SC	B. Raja Ram	Indian National Congress
50	Sultanabad	SC	P. Ramachendar Rao	Indian National Congress
51	Maidaram	None	G. Laxma Reddy	People's Democratic Front
52	Jagtial	None	D. Hanumanth Rao	Indian National Congress
53	Buggaram	None	Mohan Reddy	Independent
54	Metpalli	None	J. Anand Rao	People's Democratic Front
55	Sirsilla	SC	K. Narsiah	People's Democratic Front
55	Sirsilla	SC	Amritlal Shukla	People's Democratic Front
56	Choppadandi	None	Ch. Rajeswar Rao	People's Democratic Front
57	Karimnagar	None	J. Chokka Rao	Indian National Congress
58	Indurthi	None	P. Chokka Rao	People's Democratic Front
59	Huzurabad	SC	P. Narsing Rao	Independent
59	Huzurabad	SC	G. Ramulu	Independent
Warangal
60	Warangal	None	Mirza Shukoor Baig	Indian National Congress
61	Dhamasagar	None	T. Hyagreeva Chari	Indian National Congress
62	Ghanpur	None	B. Keshav Reddy	Indian National Congress
63	Wardhannapet	None	E. Venkataramnarsaiah	Indian National Congress
64	Jangaon	SC	G. Gopal Reddy	People's Democratic Front
64	Jangaon	SC	G. Rama Lingam	Indian National Congress
65	Channur	None	S. Venkata Krishna Prasad Rao	People's Democratic Front
66	Dornakal	None	N. Ramachandra Reddy	Indian National Congress
67	Chillamcherla	None	M. S. Rajalingam	Indian National Congress
68	Narsampet	None	K. Kanaka Rathnamma	Indian National Congress
69	Parkal	SC	Manda Sailu	Indian National Congress
69	Parkal	SC	K. Keshav Reddy	Indian National Congress
70	Mulug	None	S. Rajeswar Rao	People's Democratic Front
Khammam
71	Yellandu	ST	Dodda Narsiah	Indian National Congress
71	Yellandu	ST	K. L. Narsimharao	People's Democratic Front
72	Palwancha	None	K. Sudersana Rao	Indian National Congress
73	Vensoor	None	J. Kondal Rao	Indian National Congress
74	Madhira	None	B. Satyanarayan Rao	Indian National Congress
75	Khammam	SC	N. Peddanna	People's Democratic Front
75	Khammam	SC	T. Laxmikantamma	Indian National Congress
Nalgonda
76	Suryapet	SC	B. Narsimha Reddy	People's Democratic Front
76	Suryapet	SC	Uppala Malsoor	People's Democratic Front
77	Ramannapet	None	K. Ramachandra Reddy	People's Democratic Front
78	Bhongir	None	R. Narayan Reddy	People's Democratic Front
79	Alair	None	Arutla Kamala Devi	People's Democratic Front
80	Chinnakondur	None	K. Lakshman Bapuji	Indian National Congress
81	Nalgonda	None	Venkatreddy	People's Democratic Front
82	Nakrekal	None	B. Dharma Biksham	People's Democratic Front
83	Huzurnagar	None	Dodda Narsiah	People's Democratic Front
84	Miryalguda	None	C. Venkatareddy	People's Democratic Front
85	Deverkonda	SC	M. Laxmiah	Indian National Congress
85	Deverkonda	SC	G. Narayan Reddy	Indian National Congress

== See also ==
- 1957 elections in India
- 1955 Andhra Pradesh Legislative Assembly election
- 1952 Hyderabad Legislative Assembly election
