= Biloli Assembly constituency =

Constituency of the Maharashtra legislative assembly in India

Biloli
- Former constituency for the Maharashtra Legislative Assembly

Constituency details
- Country: India
- Region: Western India
- State: Maharashtra
- Established: 1952
- Abolished: 2008
- Total electors: 2,40,214

The Biloli Assembly constituency in Nanded district is a bit of a historical "phantom" constituency because it technically no longer exists in the way it used to.

Here is the breakdown of what happened to it and who is in charge now:

== 1. The 2008 Merge ==
Following the Delimitation of 2008, the Biloli constituency was abolished. It was largely merged with parts of the surrounding area to create the Deglur Assembly constituency (Constituency No. 90). Because of this, when people look for the "MLA of Biloli" today, they are actually looking for the MLA of Deglur.

== 2. Current Representative (2024–Present) ==
As of the most recent elections in late 2024, the sitting MLA for the area (Deglur-Biloli) is:

- Member: Jitesh Antapurkar
- Party: Bharatiya Janata Party (BJP)
- Note: He won the seat in 2024, having previously held it as a member of the Congress (INC) following a 2021 by-election.

== 3. Historical Context ==
Before the 2008 reorganization, Biloli was a stronghold for various leaders. Notably, Bhaskarrao Bapurao Patil Khatgaonkar (a major political figure in Nanded) represented Biloli multiple times in the 90s and 2000s. You might also see the name Gahininath Banda Maharaj Degloorkar in older records, as he contested from here for the Shiv Sena in the 90s.

== Members of the Legislative Assembly ==
| Election | Member | Party |
|---|---|---|
| 1952 | Narayanrao Narsing Rao | Indian National Congress |
| 1957 | More Jaiwantrao | Indian National Congress |
| 1957 | Laxmanrao | Indian National Congress |
| 1962 | Venkat Rao Baba Rao | Indian National Congress |
| 1967 | Jairam Gangaram Ambekar | Indian National Congress |
| 1972 | Jairam Gangaram Ambekar | Indian National Congress |
| 1978 | Gangadhar Mahalappa Patne | Janata Party |
| 1980 | Balwantrao Amrutrao Chavan Patil | Indian National Congress (U) |
| 1985 | Gangadharrao Deshmukh Kunturkar | Indian National Congress |
| 1990 | Bhaskarrao Bapurao Khatgaonkar Patil | Indian National Congress |
| 1995 | Bhaskarrao Bapurao Khatgaonkar Patil | Indian National Congress |
| 1998 By-election | Balwantrao Amrutrao Chavan Patil | Indian National Congress |
| 1999 | Gangaram Poshetti Thakkarwad | Janata Dal |
| 2004 | Abhiyanta Bhaskarrao Patil Khatgaonkar | Indian National Congress |

== Election results ==
=== Assembly Election 2004 ===
2004 Maharashtra Legislative Assembly election : Biloli
| Party | Candidate | Votes | % | ±% |
|---|---|---|---|---|
| INC | Abhiyanta Bhaskarrao Patil Khatgaonkar | 59,639 | 36.67% | ▲6.42 |
| BJP | Kasralikar Thakkarwad Gangaram Poshetty | 51,421 | 31.62% | New |
| Independent | Madhavrao Patil Shelgaonker | 10,201 | 6.27% | New |
| Independent | Chandrashekhar Patil Rajurkar | 7,910 | 4.86% | New |
| SP | Shinde Balaji Vishvanathrao | 7,216 | 4.44% | New |
| BSP | Narod Bhumanna Piraji | 4,934 | 3.03% | ▲2.05 |
| Independent | Haygale Sangram Vithalrao | 3,043 | 1.87% | New |
| Independent | Barande Ramchandra Gangaram | 2,994 | 1.84% | New |
| Margin of victory | | 8,218 | 5.05% | ▲3.76 |
| Turnout | | 162,647 | 67.71% | ▲4.63 |
| Total valid votes | | 162,647 | | |
| Registered electors | | 240,214 | | ▲18.74 |
| INC gain from JD(S) | | Swing | ▲5.13 | |

=== Assembly Election 1999 ===
1999 Maharashtra Legislative Assembly election : Biloli
| Party | Candidate | Votes | % | ±% |
|---|---|---|---|---|
| JD(S) | Thakkarwad Gangaram Poshetti | 36,443 | 31.54% | New |
| INC | Kunturkar Gangadharrao Mohanrao Deshmukh | 34,956 | 30.25% | ▼14.10 |
| Independent | Rajurkar Udaykumar Vithalrao | 22,498 | 19.47% | New |
| SS | Gahininath Banda Maharaj Degloorkar | 12,436 | 10.76% | New |
| Independent | Reddy Harishchandra Laxmanrao Takalikar | 6,972 | 6.03% | New |
| BSP | Rajure Piraji Chandoba | 1,128 | 0.98% | New |
| Margin of victory | | 1,487 | 1.29% | ▼14.85 |
| Turnout | | 127,605 | 63.08% | ▲6.61 |
| Total valid votes | | 115,551 | | |
| Registered electors | | 202,302 | | ▲1.06 |
| JD(S) gain from INC | | Swing | ▼12.81 | |

=== Assembly By-election 1998 ===
1998 Maharashtra Legislative Assembly by-election : Biloli
| Party | Candidate | Votes | % | ±% |
|---|---|---|---|---|
| INC | Chavan Balwantrao Amrutrao | 49,402 | 44.35% | ▲3.16 |
| JD | Thakkarwad Gangaram Poshatti | 31,423 | 28.21% | ▲15.29 |
| BJP | Patil Madhavrao Ramchandra | 30,576 | 27.45% | New |
| Margin of victory | | 17,979 | 16.14% | ▲10.54 |
| Turnout | | 113,043 | 56.47% | ▼21.67 |
| Total valid votes | | 111,401 | | |
| Registered electors | | 200,171 | | ▲2.40 |
| INC hold | | Swing | ▲3.16 | |

=== Assembly Election 1995 ===
1995 Maharashtra Legislative Assembly election : Biloli
| Party | Candidate | Votes | % | ±% |
|---|---|---|---|---|
| INC | Bhaskerrao Bapurao Patil | 61,412 | 41.19% | ▼18.89 |
| Independent | Sharad Joshi | 53,066 | 35.59% | New |
| JD | Kakde Venkatesh Rukmaji | 19,260 | 12.92% | ▼15.42 |
| BBM | Wanole Atmaram Laxmanrao | 6,203 | 4.16% | New |
| SS | Jadhav Bhagwat Ganpati | 3,286 | 2.20% | ▼4.27 |
| Independent | Aielwar Devrao Vithal | 1,124 | 0.75% | New |
| Independent | Karlekar Shesherao Manikrao | 1,097 | 0.74% | New |
| Margin of victory | | 8,346 | 5.60% | ▼26.15 |
| Turnout | | 152,755 | 78.14% | ▲12.07 |
| Total valid votes | | 149,083 | | |
| Registered electors | | 195,477 | | ▲0.65 |
| INC hold | | Swing | ▼18.89 | |

=== Assembly Election 1990 ===
1990 Maharashtra Legislative Assembly election : Biloli
| Party | Candidate | Votes | % | ±% |
|---|---|---|---|---|
| INC | Bhaskerrao Bapurao Patil | 75,512 | 60.08% | ▲7.72 |
| JD | Patne Gangadhar Mahalappa | 35,612 | 28.34% | New |
| SS | Gahininath Banda Maharaj Degloorkar | 8,127 | 6.47% | New |
| Independent | Belge Trimbak Gangaram | 1,975 | 1.57% | New |
| Independent | Aliwar Deorao Vithal | 1,407 | 1.12% | New |
| Margin of victory | | 39,900 | 31.75% | ▲20.74 |
| Turnout | | 128,323 | 66.07% | ▲5.55 |
| Total valid votes | | 125,681 | | |
| Registered electors | | 194,216 | | ▲30.27 |
| INC hold | | Swing | ▲7.72 | |

=== Assembly Election 1985 ===
1985 Maharashtra Legislative Assembly election : Biloli
| Party | Candidate | Votes | % | ±% |
|---|---|---|---|---|
| INC | Kuntoorkar Gangadhar Rao Mohanrao | 46,360 | 52.36% | New |
| IC(S) | Chavan Balwantrao Amrutrao | 36,613 | 41.35% | New |
| Independent | Syed Baleeghuddin Saquib S. Fasihuddin | 1,853 | 2.09% | New |
| Independent | D. Belge Trimbakrao Gangaram | 1,052 | 1.19% | New |
| Independent | Arun Krishnaji | 863 | 0.97% | New |
| Independent | Dange Laxuman Rao Jakoji | 752 | 0.85% | New |
| Margin of victory | | 9,747 | 11.01% | ▲10.44 |
| Turnout | | 90,232 | 60.52% | ▼3.23 |
| Total valid votes | | 88,546 | | |
| Registered electors | | 149,085 | | ▲9.50 |
| INC gain from INC(U) | | Swing | ▲10.23 | |

=== Assembly Election 1980 ===
1980 Maharashtra Legislative Assembly election : Biloli
| Party | Candidate | Votes | % | ±% |
|---|---|---|---|---|
| INC(U) | Chavan Balwantrao Amrutrao | 35,693 | 42.13% | New |
| INC(I) | Patil Bhaskarrao Bapurao Khatgaonkar | 35,212 | 41.56% | ▲38.52 |
| JP | Patne Gangadhar Mahalappa | 12,432 | 14.67% | New |
| Independent | Paldewar Gangadhar Vyankataraman | 624 | 0.74% | New |
| Margin of victory | | 481 | 0.57% | ▼10.22 |
| Turnout | | 86,797 | 63.75% | ▼3.13 |
| Total valid votes | | 84,727 | | |
| Registered electors | | 136,155 | | ▲7.82 |
| INC(U) gain from JP | | Swing | ▼9.40 | |

=== Assembly Election 1978 ===
1978 Maharashtra Legislative Assembly election : Biloli
| Party | Candidate | Votes | % | ±% |
|---|---|---|---|---|
| JP | Patne Gangadhar Mahalappa | 41,887 | 51.53% | New |
| INC | Chavan Balwantrao Amrutrao | 33,116 | 40.74% | ▼5.46 |
| CPI | Bijurkar Hanumant Tukaram | 3,557 | 4.38% | ▲2.26 |
| INC(I) | Belge Trimbak Gangaram | 2,475 | 3.04% | New |
| Margin of victory | | 8,771 | 10.79% | ▲0.45 |
| Turnout | | 84,459 | 66.88% | ▲13.23 |
| Total valid votes | | 81,290 | | |
| Registered electors | | 126,279 | | ▲15.49 |
| JP gain from INC | | Swing | ▲5.33 | |

=== Assembly Election 1972 ===
1972 Maharashtra Legislative Assembly election : Biloli
| Party | Candidate | Votes | % | ±% |
|---|---|---|---|---|
| INC | Ambekar Jairam Gangaram | 26,080 | 46.20% | ▼6.45 |
| SSP | P. Gangadharrao Mahalappa | 20,245 | 35.86% | New |
| CPI(M) | Jadhav Nagorad Madhavrao | 5,362 | 9.50% | New |
| RPI | Kamble Laxmanrao Mariba | 2,370 | 4.20% | New |
| RPI(K) | M. K. Dhondiba | 1,199 | 2.12% | New |
| CPI | Hanmantrao Tukaram | 1,197 | 2.12% | New |
| Margin of victory | | 5,835 | 10.34% | ▼4.26 |
| Turnout | | 58,658 | 53.65% | ▲6.39 |
| Total valid votes | | 56,453 | | |
| Registered electors | | 109,342 | | ▲16.35 |
| INC hold | | Swing | ▼6.45 | |

=== Assembly Election 1967 ===
1967 Maharashtra Legislative Assembly election : Biloli
| Party | Candidate | Votes | % | ±% |
|---|---|---|---|---|
| INC | J. G. Ambekar | 21,322 | 52.65% | ▼3.78 |
| SSP | V. M. Patne | 15,411 | 38.05% | New |
| Independent | N. M. Paware | 2,106 | 5.20% | New |
| ABJS | V. S. Gadre | 1,658 | 4.09% | New |
| Margin of victory | | 5,911 | 14.60% | ▼15.41 |
| Turnout | | 44,412 | 47.26% | ▼0.87 |
| Total valid votes | | 40,497 | | |
| Registered electors | | 93,976 | | ▲12.74 |
| INC hold | | Swing | ▼3.78 | |

=== Assembly Election 1962 ===
1962 Maharashtra Legislative Assembly election : Biloli
| Party | Candidate | Votes | % | ±% |
|---|---|---|---|---|
| INC | Venkat Rao Baba Rao | 21,077 | 56.43% | ▲11.21 |
| PSP | Shivraya Bhim Rao | 9,867 | 26.41% | ▲15.13 |
| Independent | Jairam Ramji | 6,410 | 17.16% | New |
| Margin of victory | | 11,210 | 30.01% | ▲20.88 |
| Turnout | | 40,115 | 48.13% | ▼5.82 |
| Total valid votes | | 37,354 | | |
| Registered electors | | 83,354 | | ▼41.50 |
| INC hold | | Swing | ▲33.14 | |

=== Assembly Election 1957 ===
1957 Bombay State Legislative Assembly election : Biloli
| Party | Candidate | Votes | % | ±% |
|---|---|---|---|---|
| INC | More Jaiwantrao | 17,906 | 23.29% | ▼33.95 |
| INC | Laxmanrao | 16,851 | 21.92% | ▼35.32 |
| Independent | Mansingh | 10,889 | 14.17% | New |
| Independent | Hammanthrao | 10,051 | 13.08% | New |
| SCF | Kadaknath | 9,059 | 11.78% | New |
| PSP | Deshpande Krishnarao | 8,673 | 11.28% | New |
| Independent | Narayan Rao | 3,441 | 4.48% | New |
| Margin of victory | | 7,017 | 9.13% | ▼32.67 |
| Turnout | | 76,870 | 53.95% | ▲23.10 |
| Total valid votes | | 76,870 | | |
| Registered electors | | 142,490 | | ▲148.11 |
| INC hold | | Swing | ▼33.95 | |

=== Assembly Election 1952 ===
1952 Hyderabad State Legislative Assembly election : Biloli
| Party | Candidate | Votes | % | ±% |
|---|---|---|---|---|
| INC | Narayanrao Narsing Rao | 10,142 | 57.24% | New |
| PDF | Anant Kashinath Bhale Rao | 2,735 | 15.44% | New |
| Socialist | Govindrao Narayan Rao Bhosikar | 2,592 | 14.63% | New |
| Independent | Bapurao Bhagwant Rao | 2,250 | 12.70% | New |
| Margin of victory | | 7,407 | 41.80% | |
| Turnout | | 17,719 | 30.85% | |
| Total valid votes | | 17,719 | | |
| Registered electors | | 57,430 | | |
| INC win (new seat) | | | | |
