= United Scheduled Castes Federation =

(USCF)

The United Scheduled Castes Federation (USCF) was a political party in Hyderabad State, India. USCF was founded by Subaiah and around 40 other erstwhile members of the Scheduled Castes Federation. USCF campaigned actively for rights for Dalits. Ahead of the 1952 Hyderabad State Assembly election USCF allied itself with the Socialist Party of India. USCF nominated four candidates, won together got 31,136 votes (0.60% of the votes in the state, 7.92% of the votes in the constituencies it contested). The most voted USCF candidate was Venkat Pratap Reddy in the Makthal Athmakur constituency, who got 18,890 votes (16.63% of the votes in the constituency).
