= Chief Minister of Hyderabad State =

The Hyderabad State was a state in Dominion and later Republic of India, formed after the accession of the State of Hyderabad into the Union on 17 September 1948. It existed from 1948 to 1956.

Following the States Reorganisation Act, which implemented a linguistic reorganization of states, the Hyderabad state was dissolved. Its different sections were merged with Andhra State, Mysore State and Bombay State respectively.

The Hyderabad State included nine Telugu districts of Telangana, four Kannada districts in Gulbarga division and four Marathi districts in Aurangabad division. After the States reorganisation in 1956, regions west of the red and blue lines merged with Bombay and Mysore States respectively and the remaining part (Telangana) was merged with Andhra State to form United Andhra Pradesh.

== Elections ==
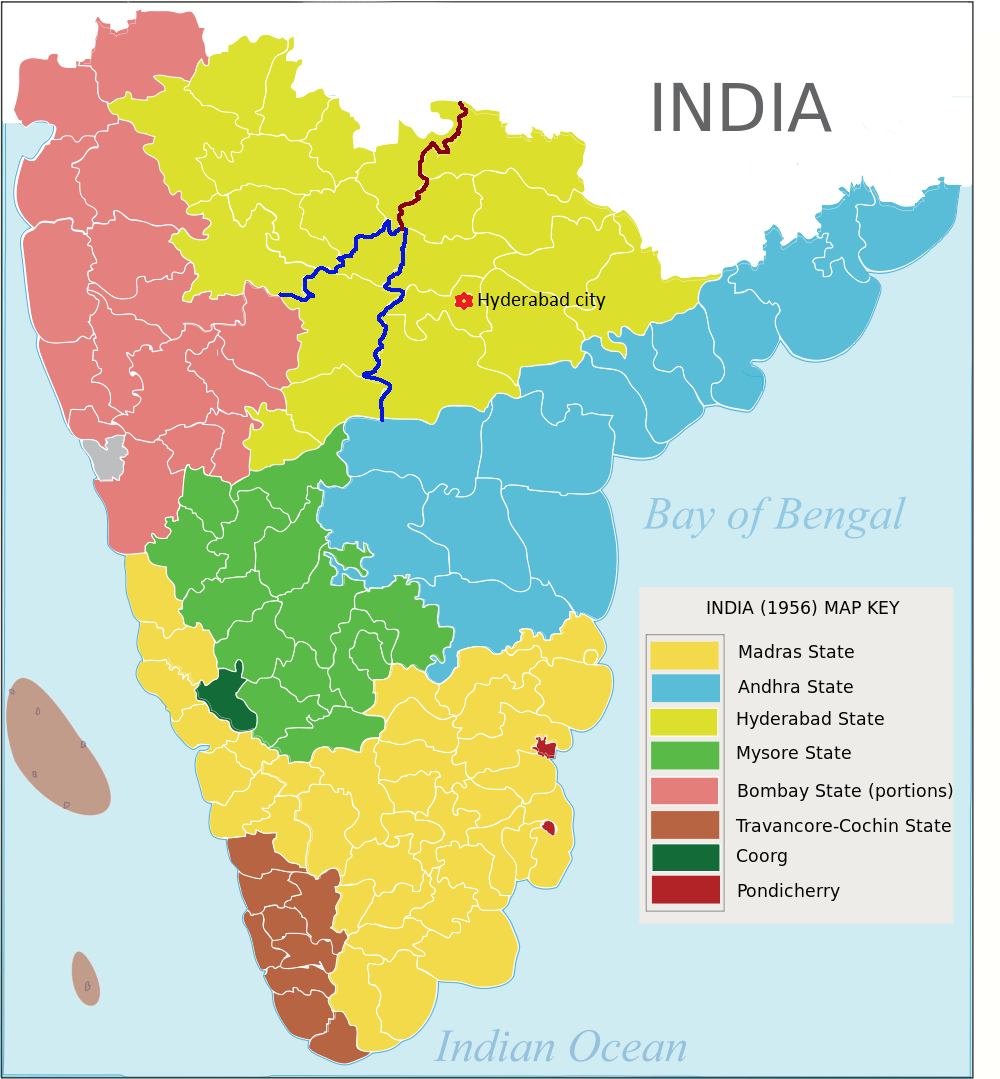
1956 map of Southern India showing Hyderabad state in yellowish green. After the state reorganisation in 1956, regions west of the red and blue lines merged with Bombay and Mysore State respectively and the remaining part (Telangana) was merged with Andhra State to form Andhra Pradesh.

In the first State Assembly election in India, 1952, Dr. Burgula Ramakrishna Rao was elected chief minister of Hyderabad State. During this time there were violent agitations by some Telanganites to send back bureaucrats from Madras state, and to strictly implement 'Mulki-rules'(Local jobs for locals only), which was part of Hyderabad state law since 1919.

=== Hyderabad State (1948–1956) ===
Location of the Hyderabad State (1948–1956) on the map of India.

#	Portrait	Chief Minister (Lifespan) Constituency	Term of office			Election (Term)	Party	Government	Appointed by (Governor)
1		Mullath Kadingi Vellodi (1896–1987); Civil servant	26 January 1950	6 March 1952	2 years, 40 days	– (1st)	Independent	Vellodi	Mir Osman Ali Khan
2		Burgula Ramakrishna Rao (1899–1967); MLA for Shadnagar	6 March 1952	31 October 1956	4 years, 239 days	1952 (2nd)	Indian National Congress	Burgula	Mir Osman Ali Khan

== See also ==
- List of chief ministers of Andhra Pradesh
- List of chief ministers of Telangana
