= Kalam Assembly constituency =

Constituency of the Maharashtra legislative assembly in India

Kalam
- Former constituency for the Maharashtra Legislative Assembly

Constituency details
- Country: India
- Region: Western India
- State: Maharashtra
- Established: 1952
- Abolished: 1978
- Total electors: 1,22,676

Kalam Assembly constituency was an assembly constituency in the India state of Maharashtra.

== Members of the Legislative Assembly ==
Election	Member	Party
1952	Achutrao Yogiraj	Peasants and Workers Party of India
1957	Tarabai W/o Mansing	Indian National Congress
1957	Revappa Krishna	Indian National Congress
1962	Pralhadrao Sopan	Indian National Congress
1967	D. T. Mohite	Indian National Congress
1972	S. Sangram Ganpatrao	Indian National Congress

== Election results ==
=== Assembly Election 1972 ===
1972 Maharashtra Legislative Assembly election : Kallam
Party	Candidate	Votes	%	±%
INC	S. Sangram Ganpatrao	30,177	56.00%	▲6.01
PWPI	Namdeorao Patil	22,519	41.79%	▼3.31
RPI	Hausas Mal Sopan Ramji	1,189	2.21%	New
Margin of victory		7,658	14.21%	▲9.32
Turnout		55,904	59.87%	▼3.63
Total valid votes		53,885		
Registered electors		93,382		▲14.21
INC hold		Swing	▲6.01	

=== Assembly Election 1967 ===
1967 Maharashtra Legislative Assembly election : Kallam
Party	Candidate	Votes	%	±%
INC	D. T. Mohite	23,974	49.99%	▲0.98
PWPI	N. K. Jadhav Patil	21,628	45.10%	New
ABJS	S. D. Soni	2,352	4.90%	New
Margin of victory		2,346	4.89%	▼1.84
Turnout		51,922	63.50%	▲10.13
Total valid votes		47,954		
Registered electors		81,766		▲34.35
INC hold		Swing	▲0.98	

=== Assembly Election 1962 ===
1962 Maharashtra Legislative Assembly election : Kallam
Party	Candidate	Votes	%	±%
INC	Pralhadrao Sopan	14,643	49.01%	▼3.75
RPI	Vithal Limbaji	12,633	42.28%	New
Independent	Bhima Nivrti Waghmare	2,601	8.71%	New
Margin of victory		2,010	6.73%	▲4.32
Turnout		32,479	53.37%	▼32.43
Total valid votes		29,877		
Registered electors		60,861		▼50.39
INC hold		Swing	▲22.46	

=== Assembly Election 1957 ===
1957 Bombay State Legislative Assembly election : Kalam
Party	Candidate	Votes	%	±%
INC	Tarabai W/o Mansing	27,950	26.55%	▼8.40
INC	Revappa Krishna	27,587	26.21%	▼8.74
SCF	Vithalrao Limbaji	25,411	24.14%	New
PWPI	Achutrao Yogiraj	24,309	23.09%	▼32.85
Margin of victory		2,539	2.41%	▼18.58
Turnout		105,257	85.80%	▲32.09
Total valid votes		105,257		
Registered electors		122,676		▲139.34
INC gain from PWPI		Swing	▼29.39	

=== Assembly Election 1952 ===
1952 Hyderabad State Legislative Assembly election : Kalam
Party	Candidate	Votes	%	±%
PWPI	Achutrao Yogiraj	15,399	55.94%	New
INC	Apparrao Maruthi Rao	9,621	34.95%	New
Socialist	Bhagawandas	2,510	9.12%	New
Margin of victory		5,778	20.99%	
Turnout		27,530	53.71%	
Total valid votes		27,530		
Registered electors		51,256		
PWPI win (new seat)				
