= Laad Bazaar =

Old market in Hyderabad

Coordinates: 17.361923°N 78.472842°E

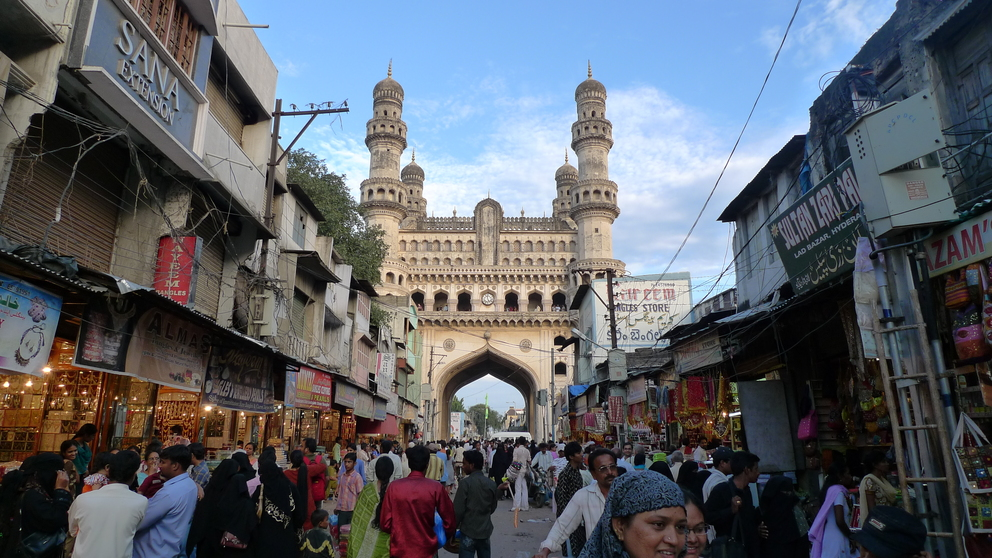
Laad Bazaar

Laad Bazaar (urdu: لاڈ بازار) or Churi Bazaar is a market located in Hyderabad, India on one of the four main roads that branch out from the Charminar.

The bazaar's name, laad means lacquer, which is used to stud artificial diamonds onto bangles. This is fitting as in this 1-kilometre (0.62 mi)-long shopping strip, most of the shops sell bangles, saris, wedding related items, and imitation jewellery.

== History ==
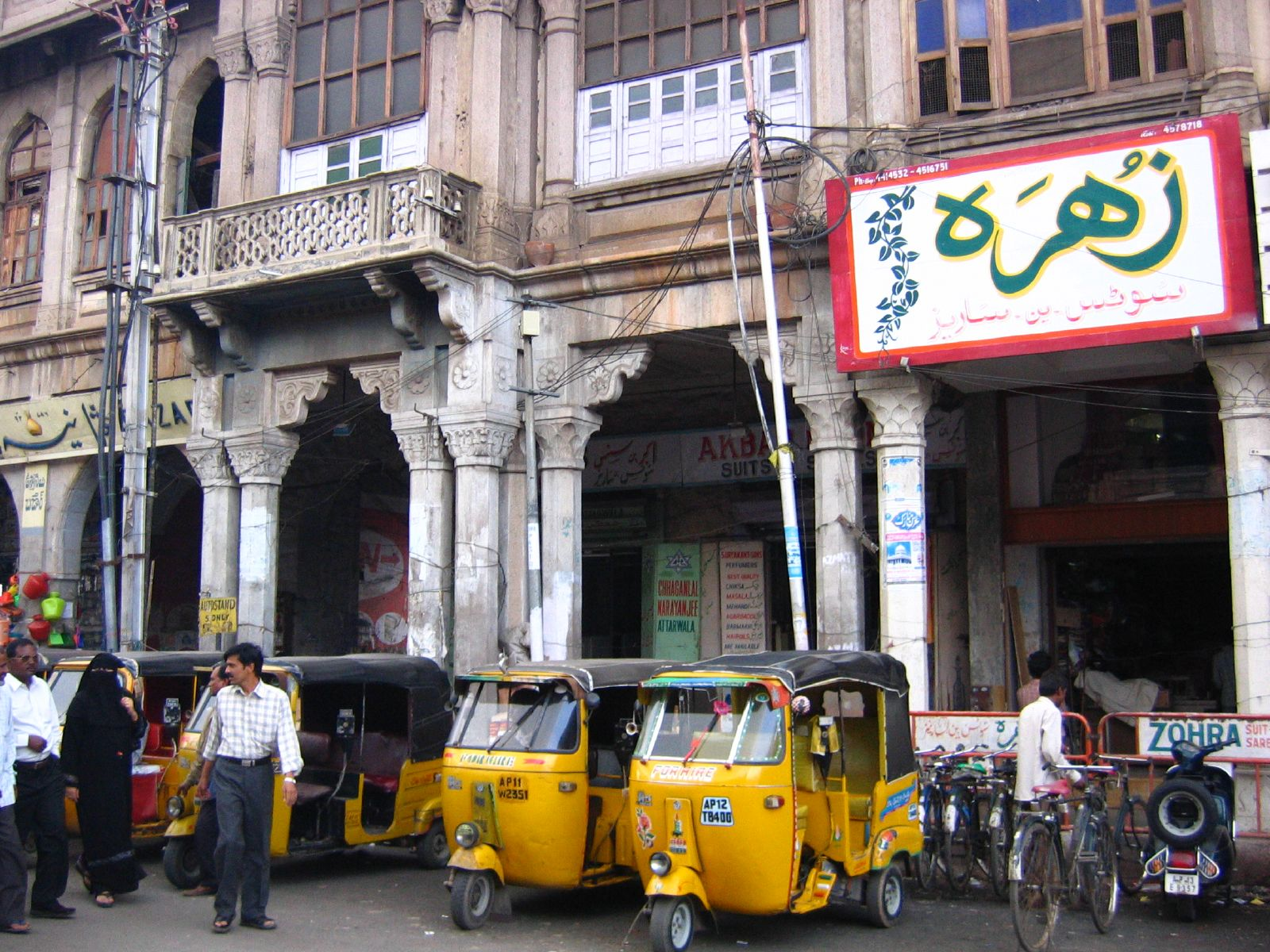
Pathergatti market near to Laad Bazaar, Hyderabad, India

This market has been in operation since the time of the Qutb Shahis, prior to the reign of the Nizams. It is close to landmarks such as Charminar and Makkah Masjid. Additionally, towards the southeast of the bazaar lie the palaces built by different Nizams, including the Chowmahalla Palace.

== Shopping ==
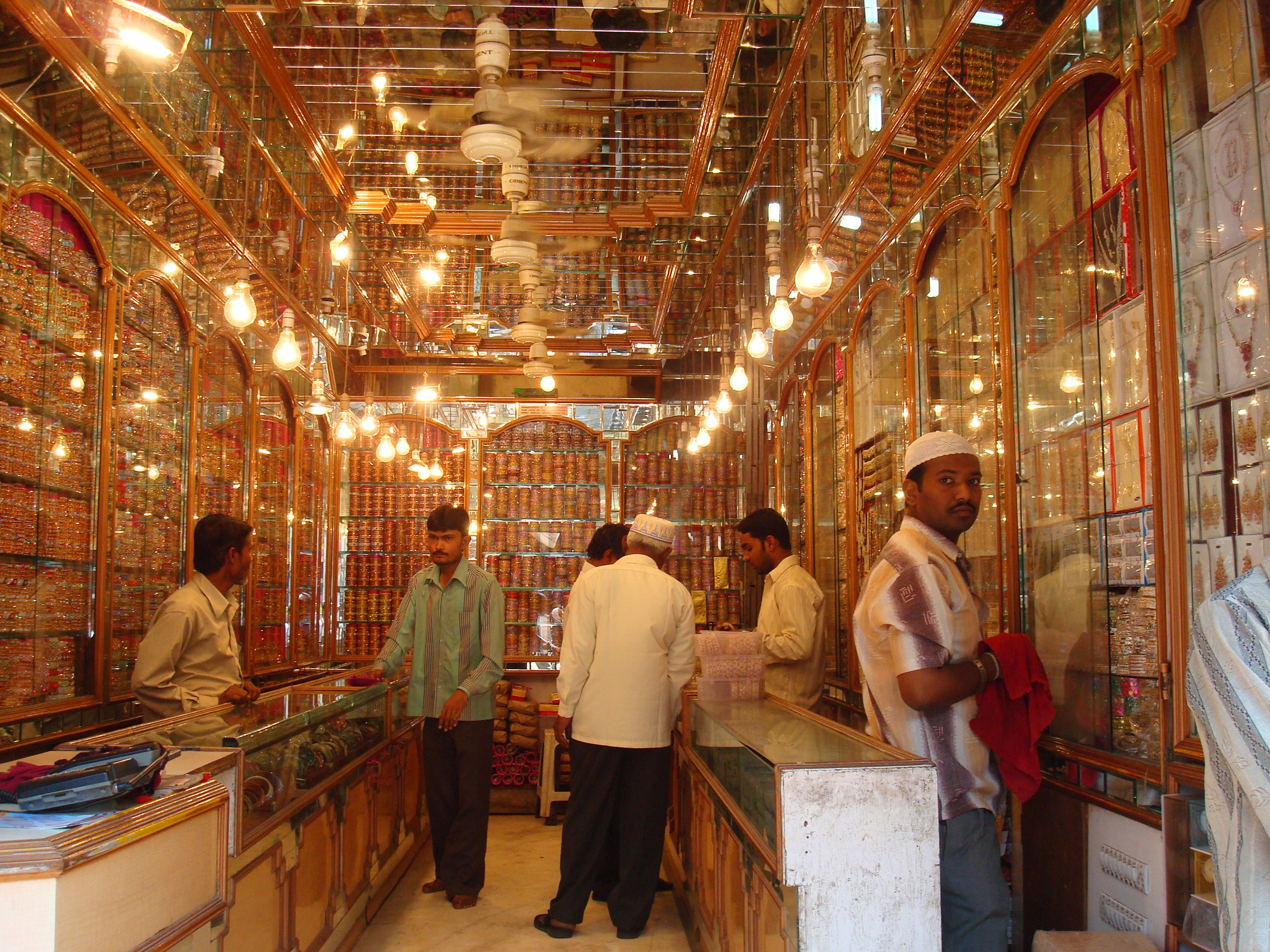
A typical shop in Laad Bazaar

Choodi Bazaar is the main market for bangles, semi-precious stones, pearls, jewelry, silverware, Nirmal, Kalamkari paintings, bidriware, lacquer bangles studded with stones, saris and handwoven materials of silk, cotton, brocade, velvet and gold embroidered fabrics, traditional Khara Dupattas, and perfumes.

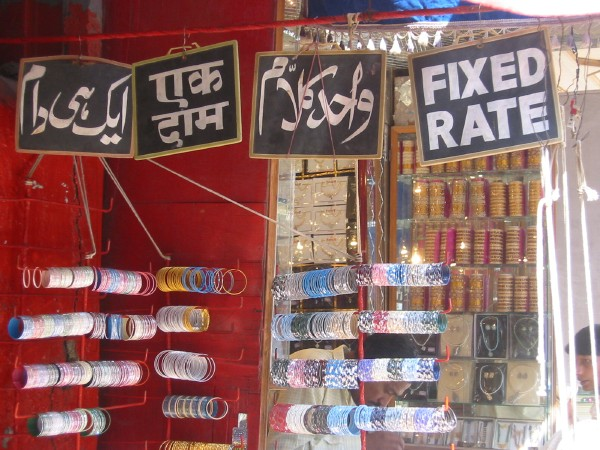

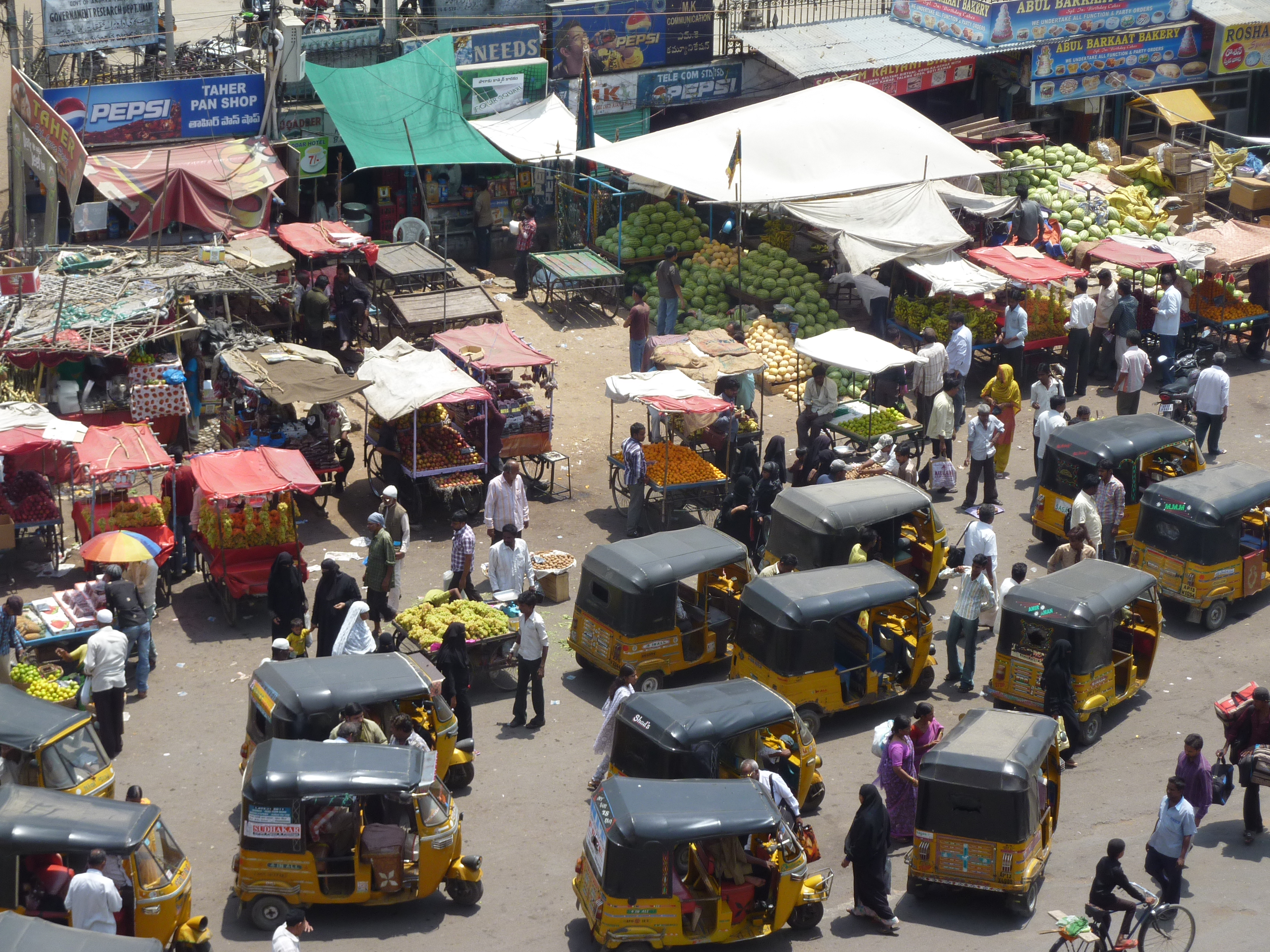
Auto rickshaws near Laad Bazaar

External image
- Bangles of Laad Bazaarimages. Published on Flickr

== See also ==
- Arabber
- Bazaar
- Bazaari
- Hawker centre (Asia) a centre where street food is sold
- Haat bazaar
- Pathargatti
- Peddler
- Retail
- Street vendor
- Street food
