= Ravi Narayana Reddy =

Indian politician

Member of the Lok Sabha
- In office 1952–1967
- Preceded by: D.V. Rao
- Succeeded by: Mohammad Yunus Saleem
- Constituency: Nalgonda (Lok Sabha Constituency)

Personal details
- Born: 5 June 1908 Bollepally, Hyderabad State, British India (now in Telangana, India)
- Died: 7 September 1991 (aged 83) Andhra Pradesh, India now in Telangana, India
- Party: Communist Party of India
- Occupation: Indian independence movement, Telangana Rebellion
- Awards: Padma Vibhushan (1992)

Portrait of Reddy

Ravi Narayana Reddy (5 June 1908 – 7 September 1991) was an Indian politician, a founding member of the Communist Party of India, and a peasant leader. He was a leader in the Telangana Rebellion against the rule of Osman Ali Khan, Asaf Jah VII. Reddy was also a philanthropist, social reformer, and parliamentarian. He is renowned in Telangana for fighting on behalf of peasants. Raavi Narayana Reddy also played a critical role in the Andhra Mahasabha as its chairman in 1941.

== Post 1947 ==
In the 1952 Indian general election, Reddy stood for the People's Democratic Front, (a pseudonym for the banned Communist Party of India), and polled more votes than Jawaharlal Nehru and also the first one entering in the parliament in independent India.

An auditorium, the Raavi Narayana Reddy Memorial Auditorium Complex at Banjara Hills in Hyderabad, was built and named in his memory by the Telangana Martyrs' Memorial Trust.

In 2006, Chief Minister of Andhra Pradesh Y. S. Rajasekhara Reddy presented the Raavi Narayana Reddy memorial national foundation award to A. B. Bardhan, Communist Party of India general secretary.
