= Begum Bazaar =

Commercial market in Hyderabad, India

- Inner City
- Location in Telangana, India Begum Bazaar (Telangana) Begum Bazaar (India)
- Coordinates: 17.373412°N 78.473774°E
- Country: India
- State: Telangana
- District: Hyderabad
- Founded by: Haji Syed Yaqoob Tawakali Ishaqui

Government
  - Type: Government of Telangana
  - Body: GHMC

Languages
  - Official: Telugu, Urdu
- Time zone: UTC+5:30 (IST)
- PIN: 500 012
- Lok Sabha constituency: Hyderabad
- Vidhan Sabha constituency: Goshamahal
- Planning agency: GHMC

Begum Bazaar is the biggest commercial market in Hyderabad, India. It was established during the Qutb Shahi rule. Begum Bazaar is located about a half of a kilometer from the Naya Pul bridge in the Old City. It is an old retail and wholesale market for household commodities. Several popular brassware merchants and copper brassware traders are based here. The bazaar is also known for its congestion and heavy traffic. It is also famous for spices and the markets nearby Charminar, a historic monument.

Begum Bazaar also has the second biggest fish market in Hyderabad, after the one at Musheerabad.

The adjoining Moazzam Jahi Market is the largest fruit and vegetable market in the city. This market is being slowly replaced by the one at Kothapet, beyond Dilsukhnagar.

It is also close to the historic Osmania General Hospital and the Musi River. The Jumerat Bazaar, where various kinds of household commodities are sold, is specially hosted on Thursdays. Mangal Bazaar is the main place in Begum Bazaar where household utensils are sold.

== History ==
The land of Begum Bazaar was gifted to the merchants of Hyderabad by Humda Begum, the wife of Nizam Ali Khan, Asaf Jah II, for trade and commerce. After developing into a market, this bazaar came to be known as Begum Bazaar.

== Transport ==
The TSRTC buses connect Begum Bazaar with all parts of the city. Afzal Gunj is the nearest bus stop.

The closest MMTS railway station is at Malakpet while the Nampally station is also nearby. The nearest metro station is MGBS.

== Political ==
Begum Bazaar falls under the Goshamahal Assembly Constituency which is part of Hyderabad's Lok Sabha Seat. T.Raja Singh Lodh is a BJP MLA from Goshamahal (Assembly constituency), Hyderabad.

== See also ==
- Arabber
- Bazaar
- Bazaari
- Hawker centre (Asia) a centre where street food is sold
- Haat bazaar
- Market (place)
- Peddler
- Retail
- Street vendor
- Street food
- Jumerath Bazar
