= Sultan Bazar =

Coordinates: 17°23′N 78°29′E

- Inner City
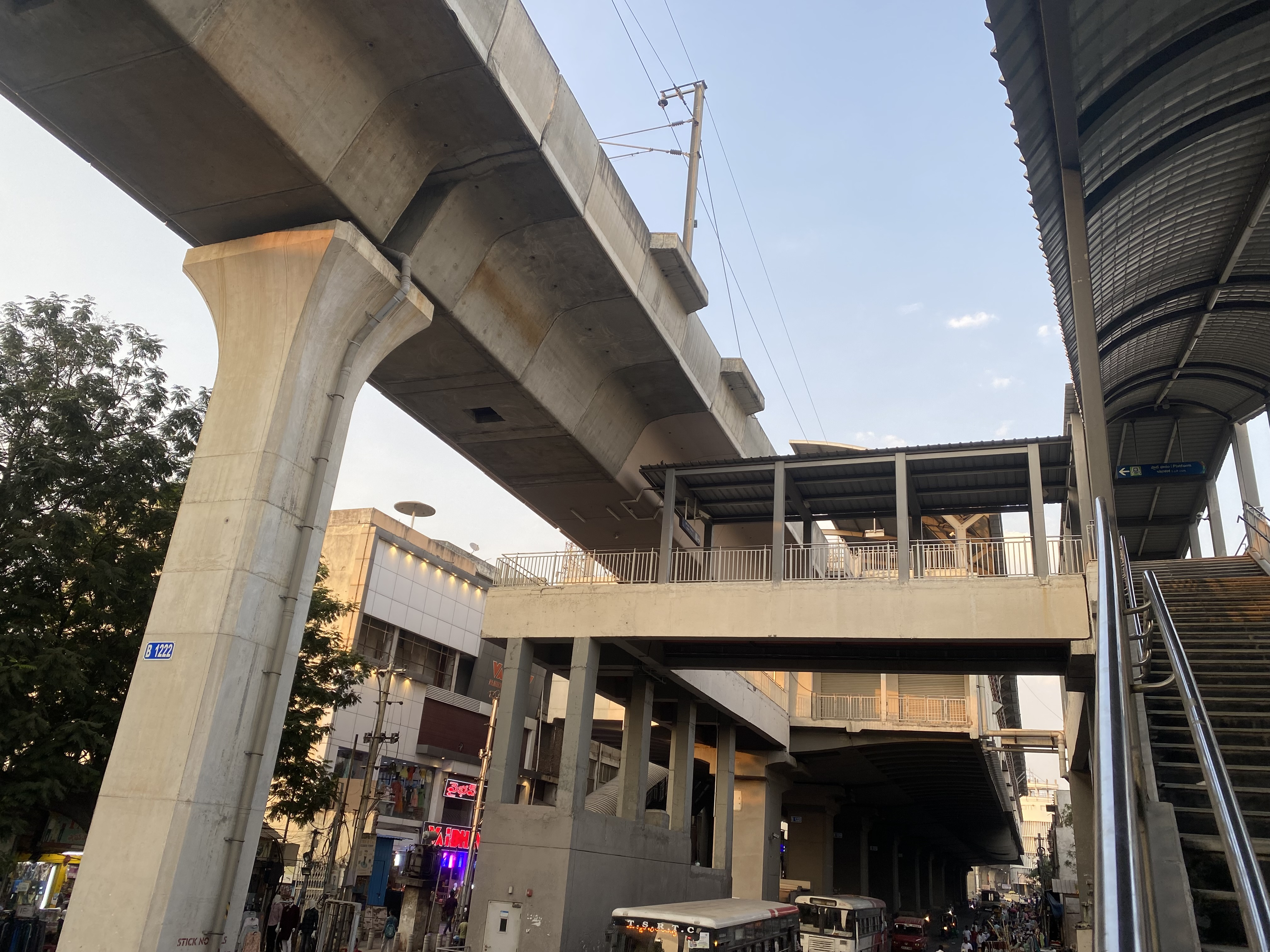
- Sultan Bazaar metro station from the Osmania Medical College exit
- Interactive map of Sultan Bazar
- Country: India
- State: Telangana
- District: Hyderabad District
- Metro: Hyderabad Metropolitan Development Authority

Government
  - Body: GHMC

Languages
  - Official: Telugu, Urdu
- Time zone: UTC+5:30 (IST)
- PIN: 500 001
- Vehicle registration: TS
- Lok Sabha constituency: Hyderabad
- Vidhan Sabha constituency: Goshamahal
- Planning agency: GHMC
- Website: telangana.gov.in

Sultan Bazar is a historic market in Hyderabad, Telangana, India. It lies between the commercial areas of Abids and Koti. The area occupied by Sultan Bazaar was part of what was earlier known as Residency Bazaars. The bazaars developed during colonial times along with the construction of the British Residency. Sultan Bazaar was previously under the control of the British and was handed over to control of Nizam on 14 June 1933. Later it was named after the nawab of that area, Syed Sultanuddin, and so is known as sultan bazar now.

== Commercial area ==
This area is a big shopping centre mainly for women's clothes and silverware.

There are more than 100 shops here, selling textiles, fashion etc.

== Transport ==
The state run TSRTC has a big bus terminal at close by koti to all parts of the city.

The closest MMTS Train Station is at Kachiguda or Malakpet.

The nearest metro station is Sultan Bazaar metro station

== Historic landmarks ==
=== Government Boys High school ===
Historic Government Boys High school at Sultan Bazaar was established in 1866 and was earlier known as Chudderghat Anglo Vernacular School. The school was built on land donated by the Nizam, and occupied an area of over 13 acres. Presently the area under the school is less than two-and-half acres with its main building in dilapidated state.

=== Sultan Bazaar Clock Tower ===
The historic clock tower which was built in 1865 is located in the school building. The clock tower has been listed as a heritage building. The clock tower was part of the Residency area but since it lies outside the boundaries today of Koti's women college is being poorly maintained.

=== Hashmat Gunj Gate ===
The gate was named after British Resident James Achilles Kirkpatrick, who was given the title of Hashmat Jung by the Nizam. The Gate bears the British government insignia, and maybe was connected to the Britishers who were present in British Residency (now Women's college). Located on the Badi Chowdi lane, today the gate is an entrance to the Kabootar Khana and is poorly maintained and is damaged by various structures adjacent to it.

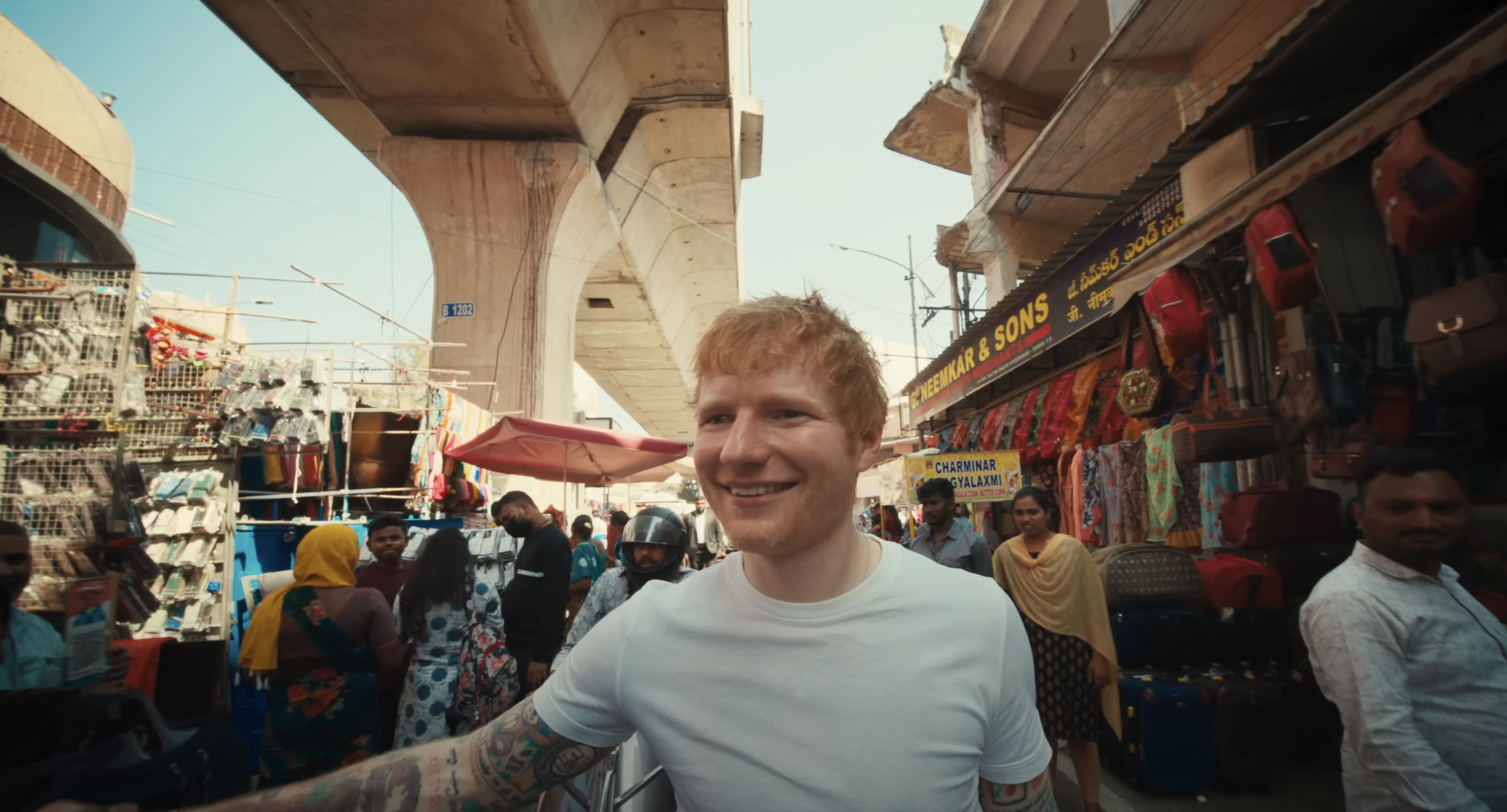
A still from the music video of Ed Sheeran's Sapphire, filmed in Sultan Bazar

== In Pop Culture ==
The narrow lanes and street markets of Sultan Bazar feature extensively in the June 2025 music video of English singer Ed Sheeran's song Sapphire, which also features Indian playback singer Arijit Singh.

== See also ==
- Bazaar
- Hawker centre (Asia) a centre where street food is sold
- Haat bazaar
- Pan Bazaar
- Peddler
- Retail
- Street vendor
- Street food
