= Pathargatti =

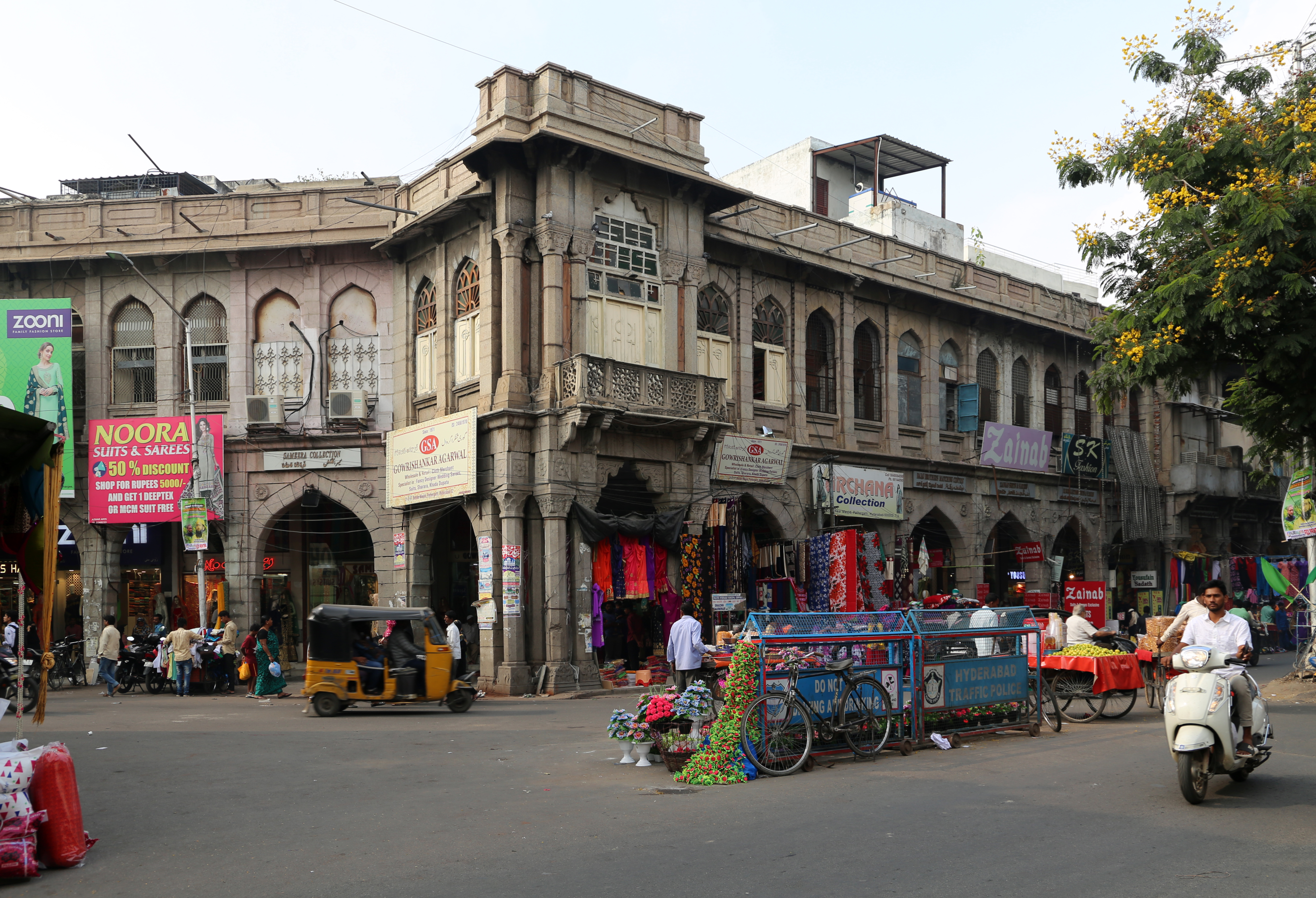
- Interactive map of the Pathargatti area

General information
- Location: Hyderabad, India
- Coordinates: 17.363463529580006°N 78.4749948647134°E

Pathargatti is a boulevard constructed of stone located near the Madina centre in Hyderabad. The two storied structures were constructed using granite and were originally designed to house shops on the ground floor and residence on the first floor.

== History ==
It was built during the reign of the last Nizam of Hyderabad State, Mir Osman Ali Khan in 1911. As the building was constructed in stone or Pathar, it was named Pathargatti. It was designed by the renowned engineer Vishveshwaraiah in a distinctive Osmanian architecture style. Pathergatti was a prominent business hub in Hyderabad for past one century. Pathergatti market is Hyderabad's first stone-arcaded market.

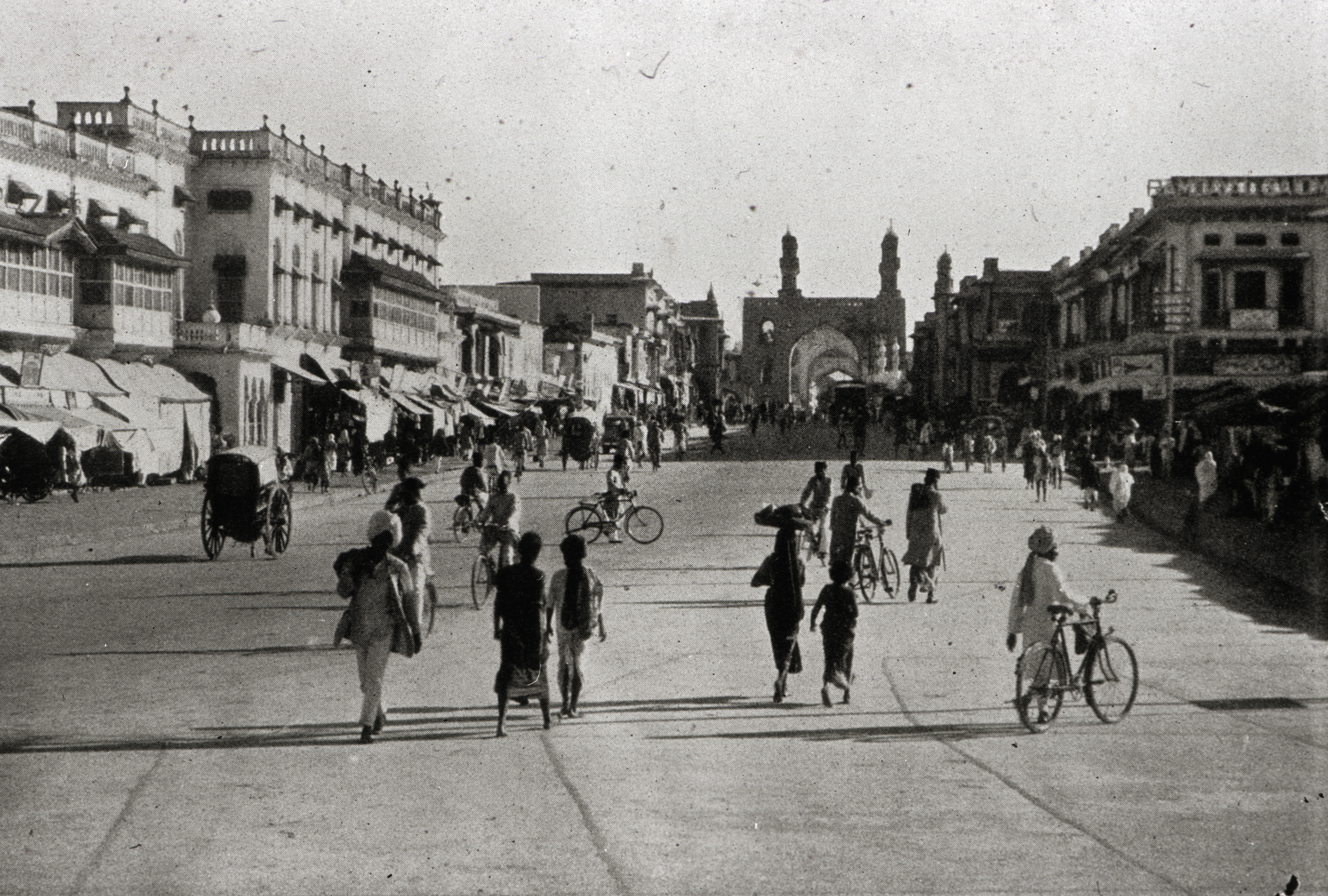
View of Pathargatti in 1938
