= Arabber =

Street vendor

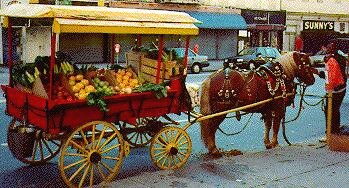
Arabbers selling produce from horse-drawn carts, Union Square, Baltimore, 2011

An arabber, or a-rabber, is a street vendor selling fruits and vegetables from a colorful, horse-drawn cart. Once a common sight in American East Coast cities, only a handful of arabbers still walk the streets of Baltimore. They rely on street cries to attract the attention of their customers.

== Arabbing ==
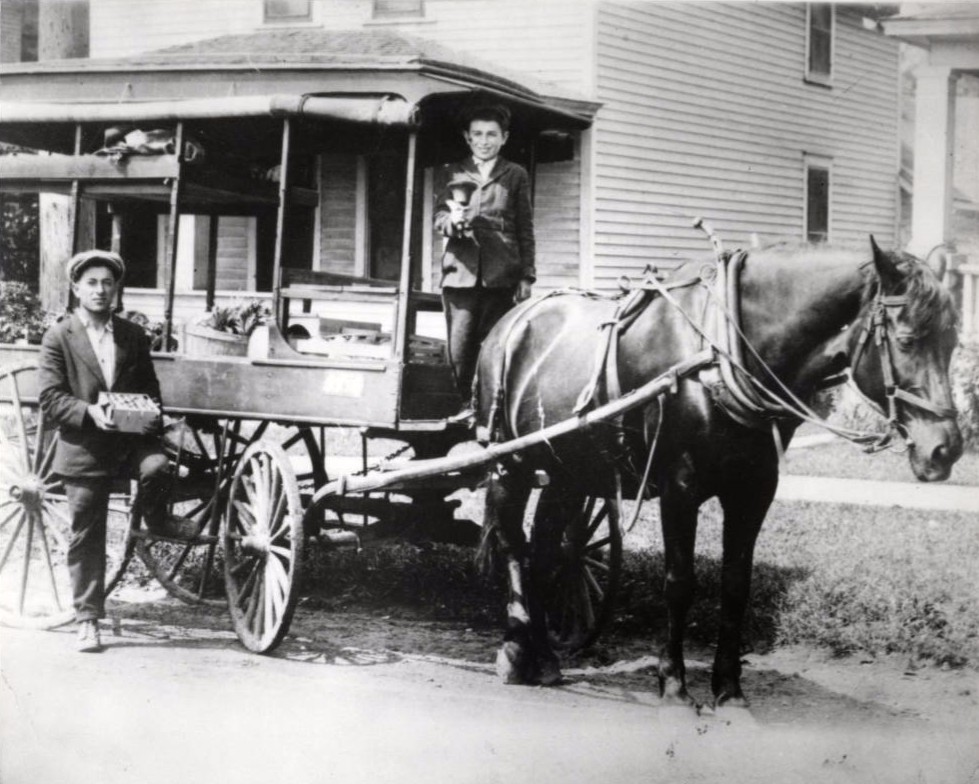
David and Harry Silverman in their fruit peddling cart, St. Paul, Minnesota, 1920

The term arabber is believed to derive from the 19th century slang term "street Arabs". Arabbing began in the early 19th century when access to ships and stables made it an accessible form of entrepreneurship. African American men entered the trade following the Civil War. Brightly painted and artfully arranged, arabber carts became a common sight on the streets of Baltimore. To alert city dwellers to their arrival, arabbers developed distinctive calls:

Holler, holler, holler, till my throat get sore.
If it wasn't for the pretty girls, I wouldn't have to holler no more.
I say, Watermelon! Watermelon!
Got 'em red to the rind, lady.

During World War II, factory jobs opened to white laborers, leaving arabbing an almost entirely African-American vocation. By then, arabbing was already in decline, threatened by the expansion of supermarkets and the disappearance of public stables. In the later 20th century, arabbers faced additional challenges from city zoning and vending regulations, and from animal rights advocates concerned about the health and welfare of the horses.

In 1994, the Arabber Preservation Society was founded to help bring Baltimore's Retreat Street stable, which had been condemned, up to city building codes. The society continues to renovate and promote the preservation of the stables serving the remaining arabbers, who number fewer than a dozen. Besides providing a nostalgic glimpse of the past, arabbers still serve a practical purpose, bringing fresh produce and other goods to urban neighborhoods that are underserved by grocery stores.

Because arabbers generally do not have complete horse-care knowledge, they have formed a working connection with Pennsylvania Old Order Mennonites. The latter, with their rural, horse-and-carriage life-style provide the arabbers with know-how and opportunities to purchase horses.

== In popular culture ==
- The documentary We Are Arabbers (2004), by filmmakers Scott Kecken and Joy Lusco Kecken, profiles contemporary arabbers.
- Season 1 of the television series Homicide: Life on the Street, set in Baltimore, features a plotline about an arabber suspected of murdering a little girl. On Season 4, episode 9, an arabber is killed as part of a sniper attack. (The series is based on a book by David Simon, who also created The Wire.)
- Arabbers appear in seasons 1, 4, and 5 of the television series The Wire, also set in Baltimore, partly written by the documentary filmmaker Joy Lusco Kecken, who also wrote for Homicide: Life on the Street.
- On the May 5, 2009 episode of the television show Ace of Cakes, reference was made to an "arabber" carrying a customer around Baltimore in a coffin, as part of a living funeral.

== See also ==
- Costermonger, a street seller of fruits and vegetables
- Greengrocer, a shop-based seller of fruits and vegetables
- Hawker (trade), a street vendor
- Peddler, a travelling seller of goods
