= Bazaari =

Merchant class and workers of bazaars in Iran

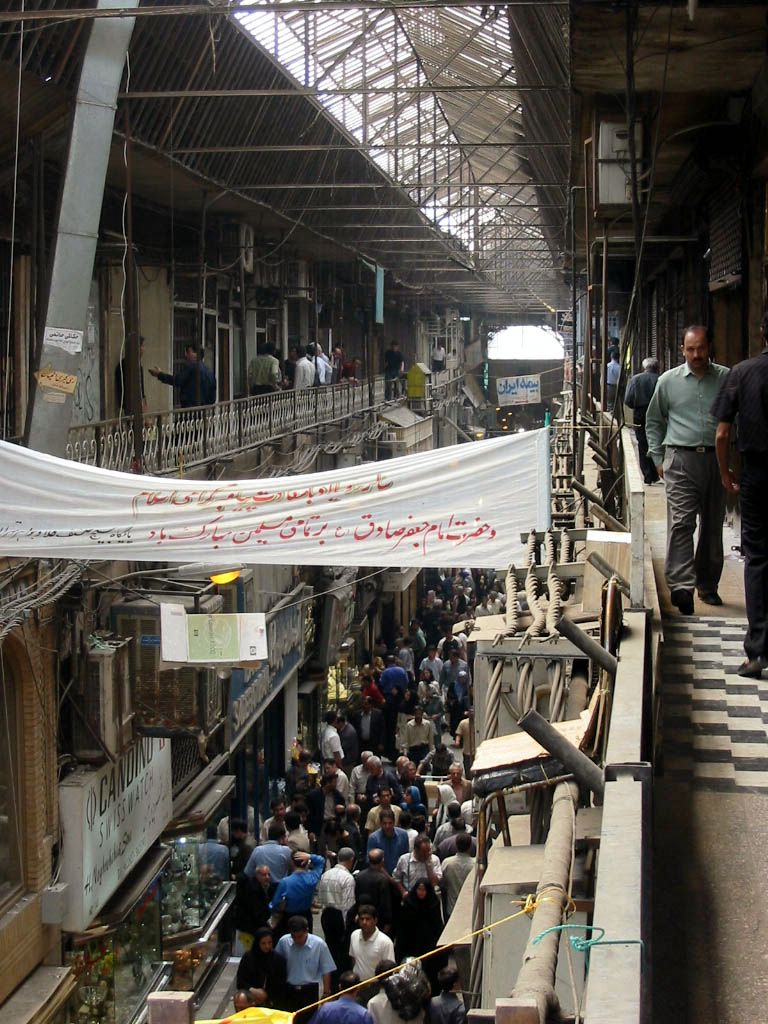
Grand Bazaar of Tehran (2004)

Bazaari (Persian: بازاری, romanized: bâzâri [bɒː.zɒː.ɹíː]) is the merchant class and workers of bazaars, the traditional marketplaces of Iran. Bazaari are involved in "petty trade of a traditional, or nearly traditional, kind, centered on the bazaar and its Islamic culture". They have been described as "the class of people who helped make the 1979 Iranian Revolution".

A broader, more recent definition includes traditional merchants outside of Iran, "a social class...in places where the society is in the midst of an awkward modernization; where the bazaar is in some stage of transition between the world of A Thousand and One Nights and that of the suburban shopping mall", an example being traditional merchants (also Muslim) who back the Muslim Brotherhood in Egypt. However, it has also been noted that merchants in other Middle Eastern countries are predominantly minority non-Muslim populations without the political influence of bazaari in Iran.

Bazaari differ from a social class as usually defined, in that they include both "rich wholesalers and bankers" as well as lower-income workers. They are united not in their relation to the means of production but "in their resistance to dependence on the West and the spread of Western ways", their "traditionalist attitude", and their "close family, financial, and cultural ties" with the Shia ulama, or clerical class.

Bazaari, "led by its large merchants", in alliance with ulama clergy "or important parts of the clergy", have played an important part in recent Iranian history. The alliance was "central" to the successful Tobacco Protest against a British monopoly tobacco concession of 1891–92, to the Constitutional Revolution of 1905–11, and especially to the 1979 overthrow of Mohammad Reza Pahlavi. Bazaari supported victims of the anti-Shah struggles in 1978 and their families, as well as providing "financial support for the antiregime strikes that began in May 1978 among university students and teachers and in the fall [of 1978] spread to the workers and civil servants".

After 1979, the bazaari underpinned the ruling elite of the Islamic Republic for decades, one example being Noor Foundation Director Mohsen Rafighdoost, whose wealth was described by American journalist Robert D. Kaplan as likely to amount to "tens or hundreds of millions of dollars". The bazaari tended to support the "traditional right" to preserve their power. However, the government of Mahmoud Ahmadinejad, despite enjoying support from the bazaai initially, took much of their economic clout away through privatization that increased the control of the economy by the Islamic Revolutionary Guard Corps and the bonyads.

In December 2025, rising discontent drove the bazaari to break with the Islamic regime, leading opposition demonstrations which helped spark the ongoing 2025–2026 Iranian protests.

== See also ==
- Bazaar
- Market (place)
- Retail
- Social class in Iran
- Souq
- Iranian Revolution
- Petit bourgeoisie
