= People's Democratic Front (Hyderabad) =

- Abbreviation: PDF
- Colours
- ECI status: Defunct

Peoples Democratic Front was a mass front of the Communist Party of India in Hyderabad, India. After the peasant rebellion was called off in October 1951, the party was formed to contest the first general election in Hyderabad State. PDF became the main opposition to the Congress in Hyderabad State.

Of total 25 MP seats from Hyderabad, PDF won 7 MP seats during the first Lok Sabha term. Among these seven MPs there were famous personalities who played a crucial role in Telangana Rebellion movement. Ravi Narayan Reddy, who won from Nalgonda with a huge majority, which is higher than the majority got by the then prime minister Jawaharlal Nehru.

== First Lok Sabha Members of People's Democratic Front ==
- Ramchander Govind Paranjpe (Beed)
- Baddam Yella Reddy (Karimnagar)
- T. B. Vittal Rao (Khammam)
- N. M. Jaisoorya (Medak)
- Ravi Narayana Reddy (Nalgonda)
- Sunkam Achalu (Nalgonda-SC)
- Pendyala Raghava Rao (Warangal)
