= List of bazaars and souks =

This is a list of bazaars and souqs.

== Bazaars and souqs ==
=== Albania and Kosovo ===
In Albania and Kosovo, two distinct types of bazaar can be found; Bedesten (also known as bezistan, bezisten, bedesten) which refers to a covered bazaar and an open bazaar.

Albania

- New Bazaar, Tirana
- The Old Bazaar of Korçë
- Krujë Bazaar

Kosovo

- Bazaar of Peja
- The Old Bazaar of Gjakova
- Bazaar of Pristina (defunct)

=== Afghanistan ===
- Shah Bazaar, Kandahar
- Shor Bazaar, Kabul
- Grand Bazaar, Herat
- Mazari Bazaar, Mazari Sharif
- Olander Bazaar, Yllib, Kandahar

=== Australia ===
- Ingleburn Bazaar (held annually during the Ingleburn Festival)

=== Azerbaijan ===
- Khan Bazar, Khankendi
- Kolkhoz (or Merkezi) Bazaar (Kolkhoz (Central) Bazaar), Sumgait
- Kohna Bazaar (Old Bazaar), Ganja
- Ortulu Bazar, Shamakhi
- Sharq Bazaar (East Bazaar), Baku
- Sharq Bazaar (East Bazaar), Sumgait
- Pasaj Bazary, Aghdam
- Teze Bazar (New Bazaar), Baku
- 8 Kilometre Bazaar, Baku
- Yashil Bazar (Green Bazaar), Baku
- Yeni Bazar, Shaki, Azerbaijan
- Zanbil Bazar (Basket Bazaar), Nakhchivan

=== Bahrain ===
- Manama Souq

=== Bangladesh ===
In Bangladesh, a Haat bazaar (also known as hat or haat or hatt) refers to a regular produce market, typically held once or twice per week.

- Amin Bazaar, Dhaka
- Bhairab Bazaar, Kishoreganj District
- Badshahi Chawk Bazaar (also known as Chowk Bazaar), Dhaka
- Dasherjangal Bazaar, Shariatpur District
- Jalchatra Bazaar, Bangladesh
- Kachukhet Bazaar, Dhaka
- Karwan Bazaar, Dhaka
- Kazir Dewri, Chittagong
- New Market Kacha Bazaar, Dhaka
- Malibagh Bazaar, Dhaka
- Banani Bazaar, Dhaka
- Khilkhet Kacha Bazaar, Dhaka
- Mohakhali Bazaar, Dhaka
- Moulvibazar, Moulvibazar Sadar Upazila, Moulvibazar District
- Shanti Nagar Bazaar, Dhaka
- BCC Road, Thatari Bazaar; Wari- Dhaka
- Neela Market
- Khatunganj

=== Belarus ===
- Slavianski Bazaar in Vitebsk

=== Bosnia and Herzegovina ===
- Baščaršija, Sarajevo
- Kujundžiluk, Mostar

=== China ===
- Grand Bazaar, Urumuqi, Xinjiang
- Monday Bazaar, Upal, Xinjiang
- Sunday Bazaar, Kashgar, Xinjiang

=== Egypt ===
- Khan el-Khalili, Cairo

=== Hong Kong ===
- Harbour City Bazaar
- Petit Bazaar

=== India ===
==== Border bazaars ====
These are mutually agreed border bazaars and haats of India on borders of India with its neighbours.

==== Assam ====
- Paltan Bazaar Assam
- Pan Bazaar Guwahati, Assam
- Uzan Bazaar Guwahati, Assam

==== Bangalore, Karnataka ====
- Gandhi Bazaar, Bangalore

==== Chennai, Tamil Nadu ====
- Burma Bazaar, Chennai
- Pondy Bazaar, Chennai

==== Delhi and NCR ====
In Delhi

- Palika Bazaar, Delhi
- Chandni Chowk, Delhi
- Khari Baoli, Delhi
- Chawri Bazaar, Delhi (wholesale market)
- Chhota Bazaar Shahdara, Delhi
- Khan Market, Delhi
- Dilli Haat, Delhi – A Haat is a regular open-air produce market
- Urdu Bazaar (Delhi)
- Meena Bazaar, Delhi
- Sadar Bazaar, Delhi

In National Capital Region (NCR)

- Surajkund International Crafts Mela
- Pinjore Gardens Bazaars
- Kurukshetra Gita Jayanti Bazzars

==== Hyderabad, Telangana ====
- Laad Bazaar, Hyderabad, India
- Chatta Bazaar, Hyderabad, India
- Begum Bazar, Hyderabad
- Shahran Bazaar, Hyderabad
- Sultan Bazar, Hyderabad
- Rythu bazaar, Telangana

==== Indore ====
- Sarafa Bazaar, Indore, India

==== Jaipur, Rajasthan ====
- Bapu Bazaar, Jaipur
- Johari Bazaar, Jaipur
- Nehru Bazaar, Jaipur
- Sanjay Bazaar, Jaipur

==== Kerala, Keralam ====
- Chala Bazaar, Thiruvananthapuram, Kerala
- Rice Bazaar Thrissur, Kerala

==== Kolkata, West Bengal ====
- Burra Bazar, Kolkata
- Bowbazar, Kolkata
- Tiretta Bazaar, Kolkata

==== Mumbai, Maharashtra ====
- Bhendi Bazaar Mumbai
- Bhindi Bazaar, South Mumbai
- Chor Bazaar, Mumbai
- Zaveri Bazaar, Mumbai

==== Munger, Bihar ====
- Bari Bazaar, Munger

==== Odisha ====
- Bhubaneswar Bazaar, Unit-1 BadaMarket, Bhubaneswar
- Gole Bazaar, Sambalpur
- Choudhury Bazaar, Cuttack
- Nua Bazaar, Cuttack

==== Punjab ====
- Chaura Bazaar Ludhiana, Punjab
- Chess Bazaar, Mohali, Punjab

==== Rajkot, Gujarat ====
- Sadar Bazaar, Rajkot

==== Uttar Pradesh ====
- Aminabad Bazaar Luknow, Uttar Pradesh
- Bada Bazaar, Jhansi, Uttar Pradesh
- Hooseinabad Bazaar, Lucknow, Uttar Pradesh
- Lalganja Bazaar, Uttar Pradesh
- Meena Bazaar Lucknow, Uttar Pradesh
- Purani Najhai, Jhansi, Uttar Pradesh
- Sabzi Bazaar, Shihura Khurd Kalan, Uttar Pradesh
- Sadar Bazaar, Agra, Uttar Pradesh
- Sarafa Bazaar, Jhansi, Uttar Pradesh
- Godowlia Market, Varanasi, Uttar Pradesh
- Vishvanath Gali Market, Varanasi, Uttar Pradesh

=== Indonesia ===
- Pasar Gambir, now Jakarta Fair, Jakarta
- id:Pasar Baru, Jakarta
- id:Pasar Turi, Surabaya
- Pasar Beringharjo, Yogyakarta
- id:Pasar Semawis, Semarang
- id:Pasar Gede Harjonagoro, Surakarta

=== Iran ===
- Ardabil Bazaar
- Bazaar of Borujerd
- Bazaar of Tabriz in Tabriz – a historic site that originally developed along the ancient silk routes; listed as a World Heritage Site
- Isfahan Bazaar in Isfahan – historic site which dates to Safavid era.
- Behjat Abad Market, Tehran
- Caravanserai of Sa'd al-Saltaneh Qazvin, Iran
- Ganjali Khan Complex, Kerman, Iran
- Bazaar of Jahrom, Jahrom, Fars
- Kashan Bazaar in Kashan
- Khan Bazaar, Yazd
- Kerman Bazaar, Kerman
- Kermanshah Bazaar, Kermanshah
- Kohneh Bazaar, Abadeh
- Qeysarie Bazaar Bazaar, Isfahan
- Tajrish, Shemiranat County, Tehran Province, Iran
- Tehran Bazaar, Tehran
- Sanandaj Bazaar, Sanandaj
- Saraye Moshir, Shiraz, Southern Iran
- Vakil Bazaar, Shiraz
- Amol Bazaar in Amol

=== Iraq ===
A Qaysari Bazaar is a type of covered bazaar typical of Iraq.

- Souk al-Bazzazeen, Baghdad
- Souk al-Safafeer, Baghdad
- Souk al-Sarai, Baghdad

=== Israel and Palestine ===
- Mahane Yehuda Market, Jerusalem
- Shuk HaCarmel, Tel Aviv

=== Jordan ===
- Souk Jara, Amman

=== Kazakhstan ===
- Kök Bazaar, Almaty
- Central Bazaar, Aktobe
- Baraholka, Almaty

=== Kuwait ===
- Souq Al-Mubarakiya
- Souq Avenues
- Souq Sharq (former)

=== Kyrgyzstan ===
- Dordoy Bazaar, Bishkek
- Osh Bazaar, Bishkek

=== Lebanon ===
- Beirut Souks
- Souk al-Tawileh, Beirut

=== Malaysia ===
- Bukit Beruang Bazaar, Malacca
- Bazar Bukakbonet Gelang Patah, Johor Bahru

=== Nepal ===
- Asan, Kathmandu ceremonial bazaar and square
- Bishal Bazaar, Pokhara
- Gaushala Bazar, Mahottari District
- Khaireni, Gulmi District
- Namche Bazaar, Namche
- Purano Bazaar, KTM
- Naya Bazaar, KTM
- Newari bazaar
- Shyauli Bazaar Gandaki, Nepal

=== North Macedonia ===
In the Balkans, the term, 'Bedesten' is used to describe a covered market or bazaar.

- Old Bazaar, Bitola
- Old Bazaar, Prilep
- Old Bazaar, Skopje
- Old Bazaar, Ohrid
- Old Bazaar, Kratovo
- Old Bazaar, Kruševo

=== Norway ===
- Oslo Bazaars – a protected site

=== Pakistan ===
==== Hyderabad, Pakistan ====
- Shahi Bazaar, Hyderabad
- Sarafa Bazaar, Hyderabad
- Saddar (Hyderabad) in Pakistan
- Resham Bazaar, Hyderabad
- Saddar (Hyderabad) in Pakistan

==== Karachi ====
- Bohri Bazaar, Karachi
- Jodia Bazaar, Karachi
- Saddar in Karachi
- Sarafa Bazaar, Karachi
- Meena Bazaar, Karachi
- Soldier Bazaar, Karachi
- Tariq Road Bazaar, Karachi
- Urdu Bazaar, Karachi
- Zainab Market, Karachi

==== Kashmir ====
- Boi Bazar

==== Lahore ====
- Anarkali Bazaar, Lahore
- Mochi Gate Bazaars, Walled City of Lahore
- Naulakha Bazaar, Lahore
- Naranki Bazaar
- Raja Bazaar
- Urdu Bazaar, Lahore

==== Peshawar ====
- Qissa Khawani Bazaar, Peshawar

==== Punjab, Pakistan ====
- Chakdina Bazaar, Kharian Tehsil of Gujrat District, Punjab, Pakistan
- Chotaka Bazaar, Multan District
- Chowk Bazaar, Multan
- Moti Bazaar, Rawalpindi, Punjab
- Multani Bazaar, Multan District
- Rail Bazaar, Multan District
- Raja Bazaar, Rawalpindi
- Rasheed Shah Bazaar, Multan District
- Saddar in Karachi (Saddar bazaar refers to a main or central bazaar)
- Saddar, Rawalpindi
- Sarafa Bazaar, Rawalpindi
- Rawalpindi bazaars
- Urdu Bazaar, Rawalpindi, Punjab
- Urdu Bazaar, Multan

==== Rajdhani ====
- Gala Bazaar, Rajdhani

==== Sargodha ====
- Urdu Bazaar, Sargodha
- Dhak Bazaar, Shikarpur

=== Qatar ===
- Souq Waqif

=== Saudi Arabia ===
- Souk Okaz

=== Serbia ===
- New Bazar, Novi Pazar

=== South Africa ===
- Marabastad, Pretoria also known as Asiatic Bazaar, Pretoria, South Africa

=== Sri Lanka ===
- Madawala Bazaar

=== Syria ===
- Al-Buzuriyah Souq in Damascus
- Al-Hamidiyah Souq in Damascus
- Souq Atwail in Damascus
- Souq Al Buzria in Damascus
- Mathaf Al Sulimani in Damascus
- Midhat Pasha Souq in Damascus
- Al-Madina Souq in Aleppo
- Souq Al-Attareen (Perfumers' Souq) in Aleppo]
- Souq Khan Al-Nahhaseen (Coopery Souq) in Aleppo
- Souq Al-Haddadeen (Blacksmiths' Souq) in Aleppo
- Suq Al-Saboun (Soap Souq) in Aleppo
- Suq Al-Atiq (the Old Souq) in Aleppo
- Al-Suweiqa (Suweiqa means "small souq" in Arabic) in Aleppo
- Suq Al-Hokedun (Hokedun means "spiritual house" in Armenian) in Aleppo

=== Tanzania ===
- Darajani Market also known as Darajani Bazaar

=== Tunisia ===
- Souks of Tunis
  - Souk Ech-Chaouachine, Tunis
  - Souk Es Sekajine, Tunis

=== Turkey ===
In Turkey, the term 'bazaars' is used in the English sense, to refer to a covered market place. In Turkish the term for bazaar is "çarşı."

- Arasta Bazaar, Istanbul
- Grand Bazaar, Istanbul
- Spice Bazaar, Istanbul
- Kemeraltı, İzmir
- Mahmutpaşa Bazaar, Istanbul
- Silk Bazaar, Bursa
- Uzun Carsi (The Long Bazaar), Bursa
- Acik Carsi (The Openair Bazaar), Bursa

=== Turkmenistan ===
- Gulistan Bazaar, (also known as the Russian Bazaar) Ashgabat
- Altyn Asyr Bazaar, Ashgabat (formerly Tolkuchka bazaar)

=== United Arab Emirates ===
- Abu Dhabi Vegetable Market
- Al Souk Al Kabir
- Dubai Gold Souk
- Dubai Spice Souk
- Dubai Textile Souk
- Sharjah Central Souq
- Souk Al Bahar

=== Uzbekistan ===
- Alay Bazaar, Tashkent
- Chorsu Bazaar, Tashkent
- Chorsu (Samarkand)
- Siyob Bazaar, Samarkand
- Mirobod Bazaar, Tashkent
- 9 Bazaar, Navoiy

=== Yearly ===
- Singapore
