= List of bazaars in India =

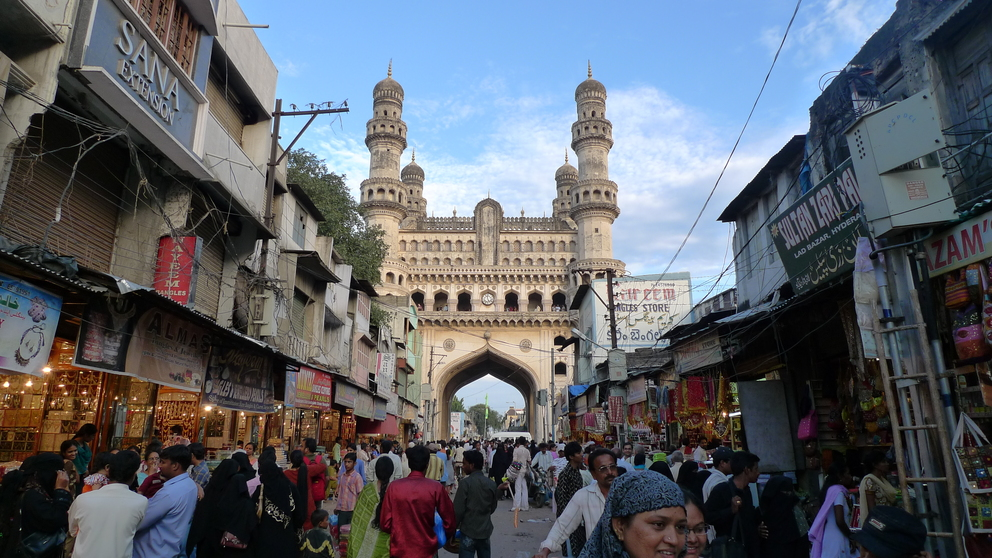
The Laad Bazaar, Hyderabad

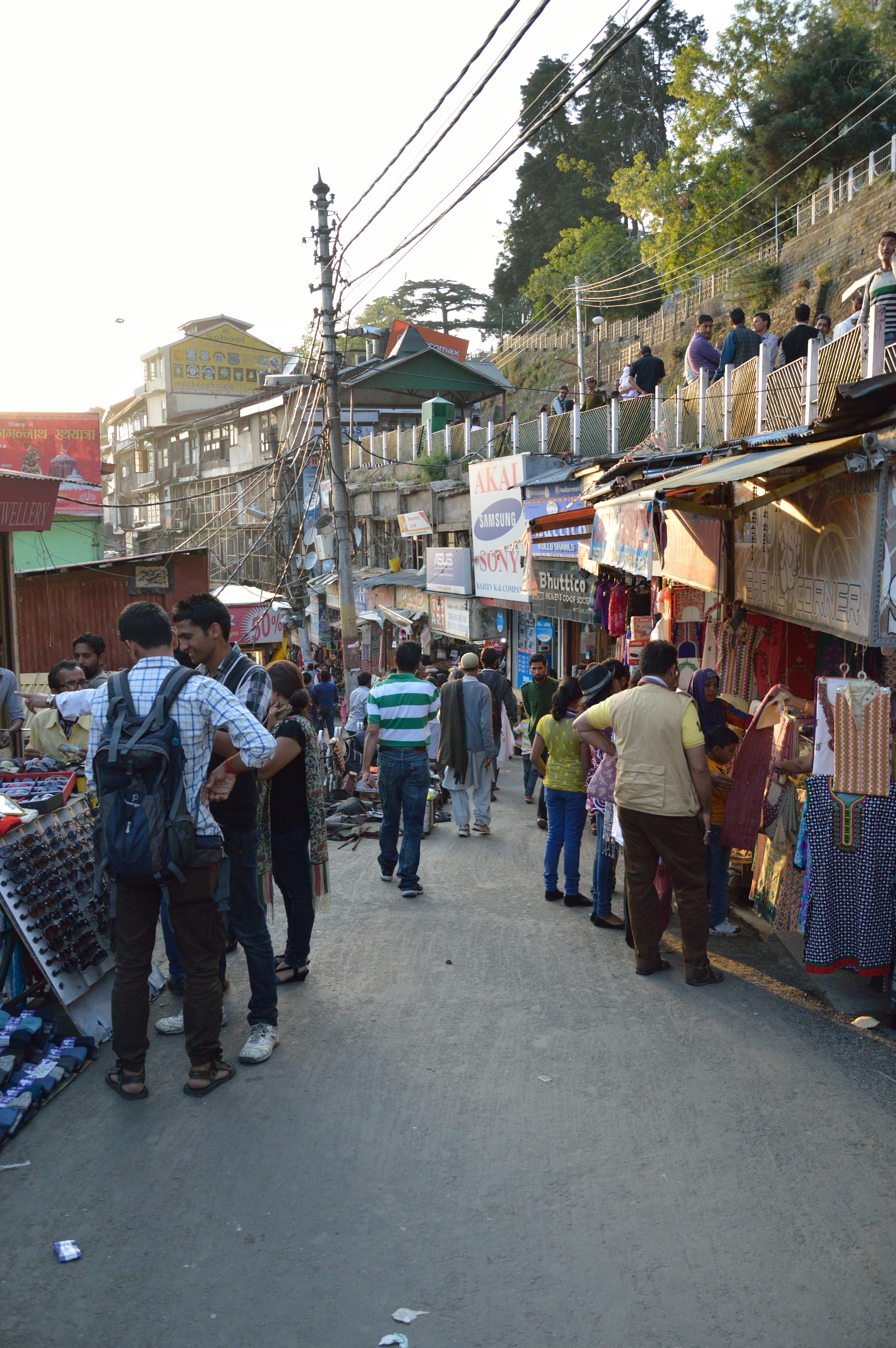
The Lower Bazaar, Shimla

A bazaar or souk, is a permanently enclosed marketplace or street where goods and services are exchanged or sold, serving as the city's main marketplace.

The term bazaar originates from the Persian word bāzār. The term bazaar is sometimes also used to refer to the "network of merchants, bankers and craftsmen" who work in that area. Although the word "bazaar" is of Persian origin, its use has spread and now has been accepted into the vernacular in countries around the world.

The term souk (Arabic: سوق suq, Hebrew: שוק shuq, Syriac: ܫܘܩܐ shuqa, Armenian: շուկա shuka, Spanish: zoco, also spelled souq, shuk, shooq, soq, esouk, succ, suk, sooq, suq, soek) is used in Western Asian, North African and some Horn African cities (Amharic: ሱቅ sooq).

== List of bazaars in India ==
| Name | Location | Notes |
|---|---|---|
| Burra Bazar | Kolkata, West Bengal | Burrabazar is considered the largest market in Kolkata, known as one of India's biggest wholesale markets and a major hub for textiles, electronics, and stationery.In between Sutanuti haat made way for Bazar Kolkata, some time in the 18th century. The market was spread over nearly 500 bighas and the residential area covered another 400 bighas. Apart from the Seths and Basaks, there were the gold merchants Mullicks and other men of their calibre. Their affluence and pomp are legends even in their days.[1] There also were merchants of comparatively lesser affluence. As for example, the area around what is now Kalakar Street was known as Dhakapattys, as it was home to the Sahas, cloth merchants from Dhaka. The Sheths and Basaks had close links with such cloth producing centres as Dhaka, Murshidabad and Cossimbazar. |
| Begum Bazaar | Hyderabad | Begum Bazar is the biggest commercial market in Hyderabad, India. It was established during the Qutb Shahi rule. Begum Bazar is located half a kilometer from the Naya Pul bridge in the Old City. It is an age old retail and wholesale market for household commodities.several brassware merchants and copper brassware traders are famous in Begum Bazar. The only hitch at the bazar is the congestion and lack of hygiene. |
| Bhendi Bazaar | Mumbai | Bhendi Bazaar is a market in South Mumbai. Bhendi Bazaar gets its name from the row of Hibiscus populnea, north of Pydhonie. According to Sir George Birdwood, "the Bhendy tree is Thespesia populnea, in Southern India, commonly called Portia, a favourite ornamental tree, thriving best near the sea. In Ceylon, it is called Saria gansuri and also the Tulip tree." |
| Burma Bazaar | Chennai | Burma Bazaar is a market run by Burmese refugees in Chennai, India. It is located at Parrys Corner and is one of the several unorganized or grey market shopping hubs of Chennai. The bazaar was set up in 1969 by the Government of Tamil Nadu. It is located just outside the Chennai Beach railway station, in the old financial district of the city at George Town. It is a row of about 200 shops that line either side of the road for about a kilometre. |
| Chandni Chowk | Old Delhi | The Chandni Chowk is one of the oldest and busiest markets in Old Delhi, India. It is located close to Old Delhi Railway Station. The Red Fort monument is located at the eastern end of Chandni Chowk. It was built in the 17th century by Mughal Emperor of India Shah Jahan and designed by his daughter Jahanara. The market was once divided by canals (now closed) to reflect moonlight and remains one of India's largest wholesale markets. |
| Khari Baoli | Old Delhi | The Khari Baoli market in Old Delhi is considered the largest spice market in Asia. The market has been operating since the 17th century the market is located near the Red Fort on the Khari Baoli road next to the Fatehpuri masjid in Chandni Chowk. |
| Chatta Bazaar | Hyderabad | Chatta Bazaar is located in Hyderabad, India. Chatta Bazar is one of the oldest bazaars in Hyderabad and was the first to organize shops under a roof for better storage of goods. Currently Chatta Bazar is known as one of the main markets for printing invitation cards, specifically calligraphed and decorated Urdu printing. There are about 250 printing presses in the market. |
| Chaura Bazaar | Ludhiana | Chaura Bazaar, Ludhiana is the main and old market of the city. It is like a commercial hub of the Ludhiana. Chaura Bazaar is an old market of 19th century. Some old building are still located in the streets of Chaura Bazaar. It was established on the bank of Sutlej River at Ludhiana. "Chaura Bazaar" literally means 'Wide Market'. Earlier days, market's streets were looking wide. So from this wide open streets its name become Chaura Bazaar. But according to in 21st century population streets are very narrow. It is difficult to take pass at daytime, and still people throng it. Every Sunday is a special and most busy day, just like Boxing Day. |
| Chawri Bazar | Old Delhi | Chawri Bazar is a specialized wholesale market of brass, copper and paper products. Established in 1840, with a hardware market, it was the first wholesale market of Old Delhi it lies to the west of Jama Masjid in Delhi. It can be reached by taking the street just near the middle projection of Jama Masjid's western (rear) wall. It was accessible via the Chawri Bazar underground station of the Delhi Metro. |
| Chira Bazaar | Mumbai | Chira Bazaar is a neighborhood in Mumbai. It is famous for its jewellery and Marathi community. There is also a famous fish market called Chirabazar. |
| Dava Bazaar | Mumbai | Dava Bazaar (also spelled Dawa Bazaar and Dava Bazar) is an area in South Mumbai famous for medical and scientific instruments, and lab chemicals. It is located near Lohar Chawl, Crawford Market and opens into Princess Street. Dava in Hindi means medicine. |
| Dilli Haat | Delhi | Dilli Haat is a paid-entrance open-air market, food plaza, and craft bazaar located in Delhi. The area is run by Delhi Tourism and Transportation Development Corporation (DTTDC), and unlike the traditional weekly market, the village Haat, Dilli Haat is permanent. It is located in the commercial centres of South Delhi, opposite INA market. |
| Gandhi Bazaar | Bangalore | Gandhi Bazaar is a busy market area in Basavanagudi, Bangalore, known mainly for its flower and condiment hawker shops. One of the oldest areas in the city, Gandhi Bazaar is said to be traditional and conservative. The area also houses many temples; fruit, vegetable and cloth stores; and restaurants, including the Vidyarthi Bhavan which was started in 1943. |
| Ima Market | Imphal | Ima Keithel (mother's market), also known as Ima Market or Nupi Keithel (women's market) is a market run exclusively by women in Imphal, India. It is a commercial center and a popular tourist attraction in the state of Manipur. It has shifted its location within the city of Imphal over the years and is currently located in Khawairaband Bazaar. |
| Khan Market | Delhi | Khan Market is a shopping district and retail market in Delhi, India. It was established in 1951, and named in honour of freedom fighter Khan Abdul Ghaffar Khan (popularly known as Frontier Gandhi or Badshah Khan). In 2019, it was rated as the world's 20th most expensive commercial street by Cushman & Wakefield. |
| Laad Bazaar | Hyderabad | Laad Bazaar or Choodi Bazaar is a very old market popular for bangles located in Hyderabad, India. It is located on one of the four main roads that branch out from the historic Charminar. Laad meaning lacquer is used to make bangles, on which artificial diamonds are studded. In this 1-kilometre (0.62 mi)-long shopping strip, most of the shops sell bangles, saris, wedding related items, and imitation jewelry. |
| Lakkar Bazaar | Shimla | Lakkar Bazaar is a marketplace adjoining the Ridge in Shimla, India. Shops offer wooden articles targeted mainly at tourists. There is also a roller skating rink in Lakkar Bazaar. The state hospital known as Indira Gandhi Medical College and hospital is also adjoining to Lakkar Bazaar. |
| Lower Bazaar | Shimla | Lower Bazaar is a major market with a lot of streets in Shimla, India. It is just below the Middle Bazaar and Mall Road. The market includes shops of every sphere such as household items, electronics, digital equipments, musical instruments, clothing of many brands, restaurants, dhabas, stationary, vegetables, shoes, etc. The market is quite popular among locals. |
| Mapusa Friday Market | Mapusa | Mapusa Friday Market is a traditional, regional weekly market in Mapusa, North Goa and a major tourist attraction. It is located within and around the Mapusa Municipal market area. |
| New Market | Kolkata | New Market, formally known as Sir Stuart Hogg Market,[2] is a market complex in Kolkata situated on Lindsay Street at Dharmatala. Although primarily "New Market" referred to the original enclosed market, but in local parlance, the entire shopping area along with the market complex is known as "New MarkeA popular and bustling market where you can find a variety of goods, from clothing and accessories to food items and spices. |
| Palika Bazaar | Delhi | Palika Bazaar is an underground market located between the inner and outer circle of Connaught Place, Delhi, India. It is named after Palika Bazaar of Mumbai. Palika Bazaar hosts 380 numbered shops selling a diverse range of items; however, the market is dominated by electronic items and clothing. |
| Paltan Bazaar | Guwahati | Paltan Bazaar is a locality of Guwahati, Assam. It is surrounded by the localities of Pan Bazaar, Uloobari, Rehabari, Fancy Bazaar. Its location in the central part of the city-centre is the hub for transportation and hotels in Guwahati, Assam. With Guwahati Railway Station, the ASTC bus stand, numerous hotels, restaurants, offices and stops of numerous private bus service (regional) providers, makes it one of the busiest and congested area of city. |
| Pan Bazaar | Guwahati | Pan Bazaar (also spelled as Panbazar) is a locality in Guwahati, India surrounded by localities of Paltan Bazaar, Ambari and Fancy Bazaar. Situated on the banks of the river Brahmaputra, it is part of the city centre. Pan Bazaar means "betel-leaf mart" in English. The locality is known for its various administrative, cultural and religious buildings. It is also known for being a shopping district. |
| Pinjore Gardens | Pinjore | Yadavindra Gardens, also known as Pinjore Gardens, is a historic 17th century garden located in Pinjore city of Panchkula district in the Indian state of Haryana. It is an example of the Mughal Gardens architectural style, which was renovated by the Patiala Dynasty Sikh Rulers. It was built by fadai khan. |
| Pondy Bazaar | Chennai | Pondy Bazaar, officially called Soundarapandianar Angadi, is a market and neighborhood located in T. Nagar, Chennai. It is one of the principal shopping districts of Chennai. |
| Rice Bazaar | Thrissur | Rice Bazaar is a wholesale market for different kinds of rice, located in the heart of City of Thrissur in Kerala state of India. The market traces its origin around 200 years ago. |
| Rythu bazaar | Telangana, Andhra Pradesh | Rythu bazaar, or raithu bazaar, or raitubazar, is a type of farmers' market in Indian states of Andhra Pradesh and Telangana. It is run by the Governments of Andhra Pradesh and Telangana for small scale farmers with small landholdings. The first market started in January 1999 by N. Chandrababu Naidu. |
| Chappan Dukan | Indore | Chappan Dukan, officially known as 56 Dukan, is a food and shopping street located in Indore, Madhya Pradesh, India. It is known for its active street food scene and variety of shops, establishing itself as a notable landmark for residents and visitors alike. |
| Sadar Bazaar | Agra | Sadar Bazaar is a popular shopping destination for tourists visiting Agra. It is located close to Agra Cantonment railway station and is in proximity to the Taj Mahal and Agra Fort. |
| Sadar Bazaar | Delhi | Sadar Bazaar is the largest wholesale cosmetics jewellery market of household items in Delhi, India. Like other major markets of Old Delhi, this market is very crowded and buzzes with activity. Although it is primarily a wholesale market, it also caters to occasional retail buyers. |
| Sarafa Bazaar | Indore | Sarafa Bazaar is a jewellery market and night street food court located in central Indore, India. Sarafa is one of the market in India which remains as a jewellery marketplace at daytime and converts itself into a street food court at night. The market consists of two sub-markets namely Bada Sarafa Bazaar and Chhota Sarafa Bazaar. Indore's Sarafa Bazaar is a popular tourist place because of its cuisine and night lifestyle. |
| Sultan Bazar | Hyderabad | Sultan Bazaar is an old commercial market in Hyderabad, Telangana, India. It lies between the commercial areas of Abids and Koti. It was earlier known as residency bazaar. Later it was named after the nawab of that Area Syed Sultanuddin which is known as sultan bazar now. |
| Urdu Bazaar | Old Delhi | The Urdu Bazaar, literally 'Urdu market,' was a major market in the walled city of Delhi, India. The open grounds between the Jama Masjid and Red Fort were used for camping by the Mughal soldiery as well as an ammunition market. The original market was destroyed in the aftermath of the Indian Rebellion of 1857. |
| Zaveri Bazaar | Mumbai | Zaveri Bazaar is a jewellery market and a major hub for B2B and B2C jewellery industry in Mumbai, India. Located at Bhuleshwar in South Mumbai, just north of Crawford Market, Zaveri Bazaar is a muddle of narrow lanes, dotted with hundreds of jewellery shops that sell gems and jewels, notably Tribhovandas Bhimji Zaveri (TBZ), Dwarkadas Chandumal, Dhirajlal Bhimji Zaveri & UTZ. 65% of all gold trading and dealing in India is estimated to originate from the market. |
