= Urdu Bazaar (disambiguation) =

The Urdu Bazaar is a major market in the walled city of Delhi, India.

Urdu Bazaar may also refer to:

- Urdu Bazaar (Karachi), Pakistan
- Urdu Bazaar (Sargodha), Pakistan
