= Gunasheela Surgical and Maternity Hospital =

Hospital in Bangalore, India

Coordinates: 12.94024°N 77.57651°E

Gunasheela Surgical and Maternity Hospital is a specialized women's healthcare facility in Basavanagudi, Bangalore, India. The hospital focuses on obstetrics, gynaecology, and reproductive medicine.

== Recognition ==
The facility won the India Healthcare Award for gynecology.
