= Polycab India =

Indian electrical equipment company

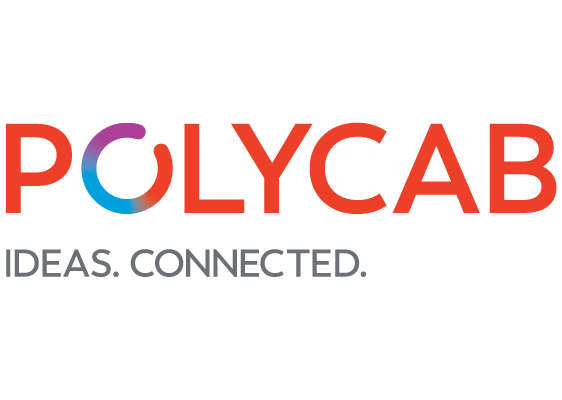
- Polycab India logo

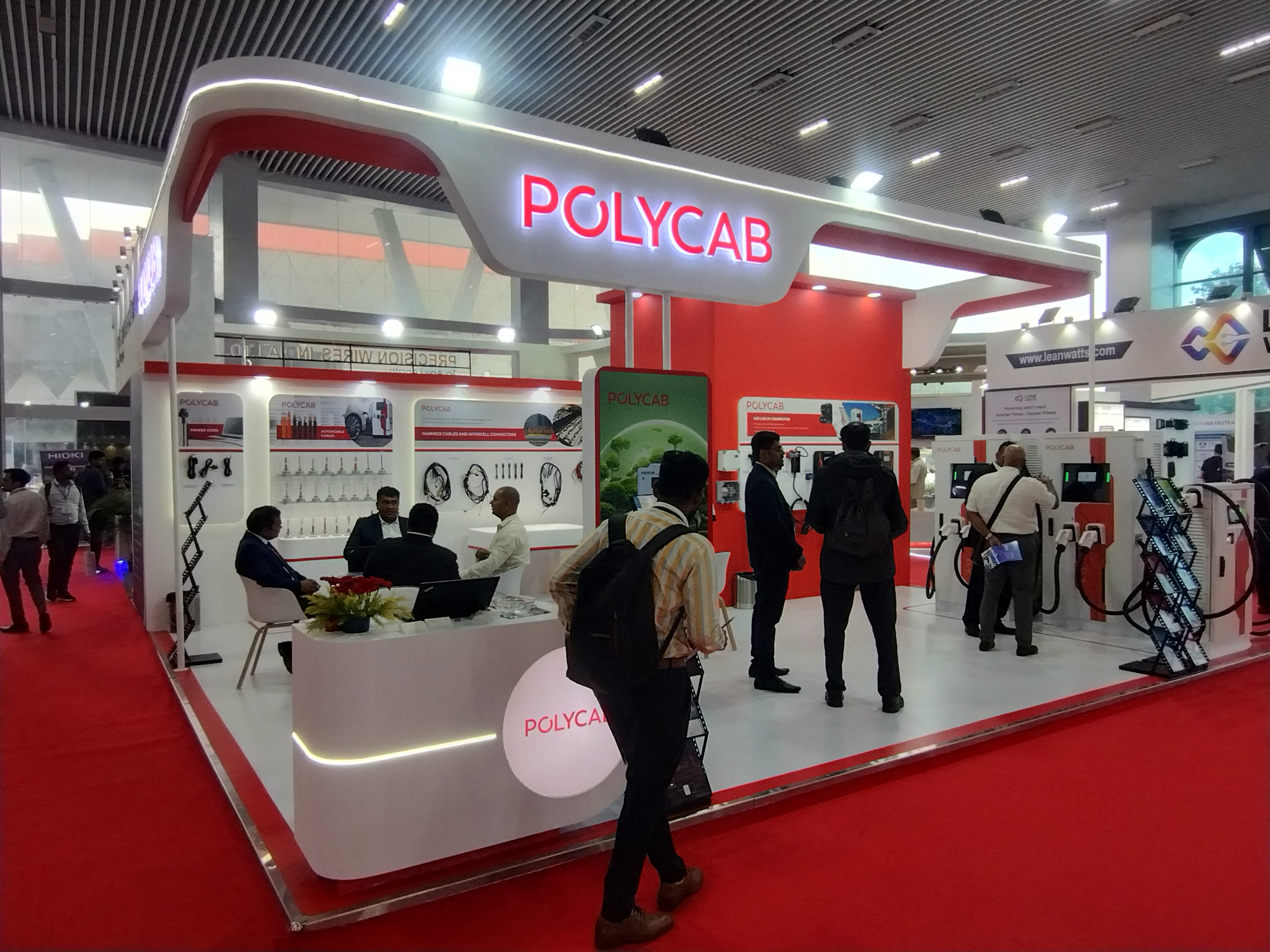
- Polycab India at Auto EV Bharat 4.0, KTPO Exhibition centre, Bangalore (2025)
- Company type: Public
- Traded as: BSE: 542652; NSE: POLYCAB
- Industry: Electrical equipment
- Founded: 1964
- Headquarters: Mumbai, India
- Area served: India
- Key people: Inder T. Jaisinghani (Chairman and Managing Director)
- Products: Wires and cables, electric fans, LED lighting and luminaires, switches and switchgear, solar products, conduits and accessories
- Revenue: ▲₹18,039 crore (US$1.9 billion) (2024)
- Net income: ▲₹1,802 crore (US$190 million) (2024)
- Website: polycab.com

Polycab India Limited is an Indian electrical equipment company based in Mumbai, India. The company manufactures and sells electrical products, including wires and cables, electric fans, LED lighting and luminaires, switches and switchgear, solar products, and conduits and accessories. It also operates in the engineering, procurement, and construction (EPC) sector.

In 2023, the company was ranked 161st on the Fortune India 500 list in 2023, with revenues of ₹14,206 crores. It is the largest wire and cable manufacturer in India and holds 25% to 26% of the market share in the wires and cables sector in India. As of March 2023, the company operates 28 manufacturing units in Gujarat, Maharashtra, Karnataka, Uttarakhand, Tamil Nadu, and the Union Territory of Daman, along with over 29 warehouses across India. The company is included in the MSCI Standard Index, and is a constituent of the Nifty Midcap 100 Index and the BSE 200 Index.

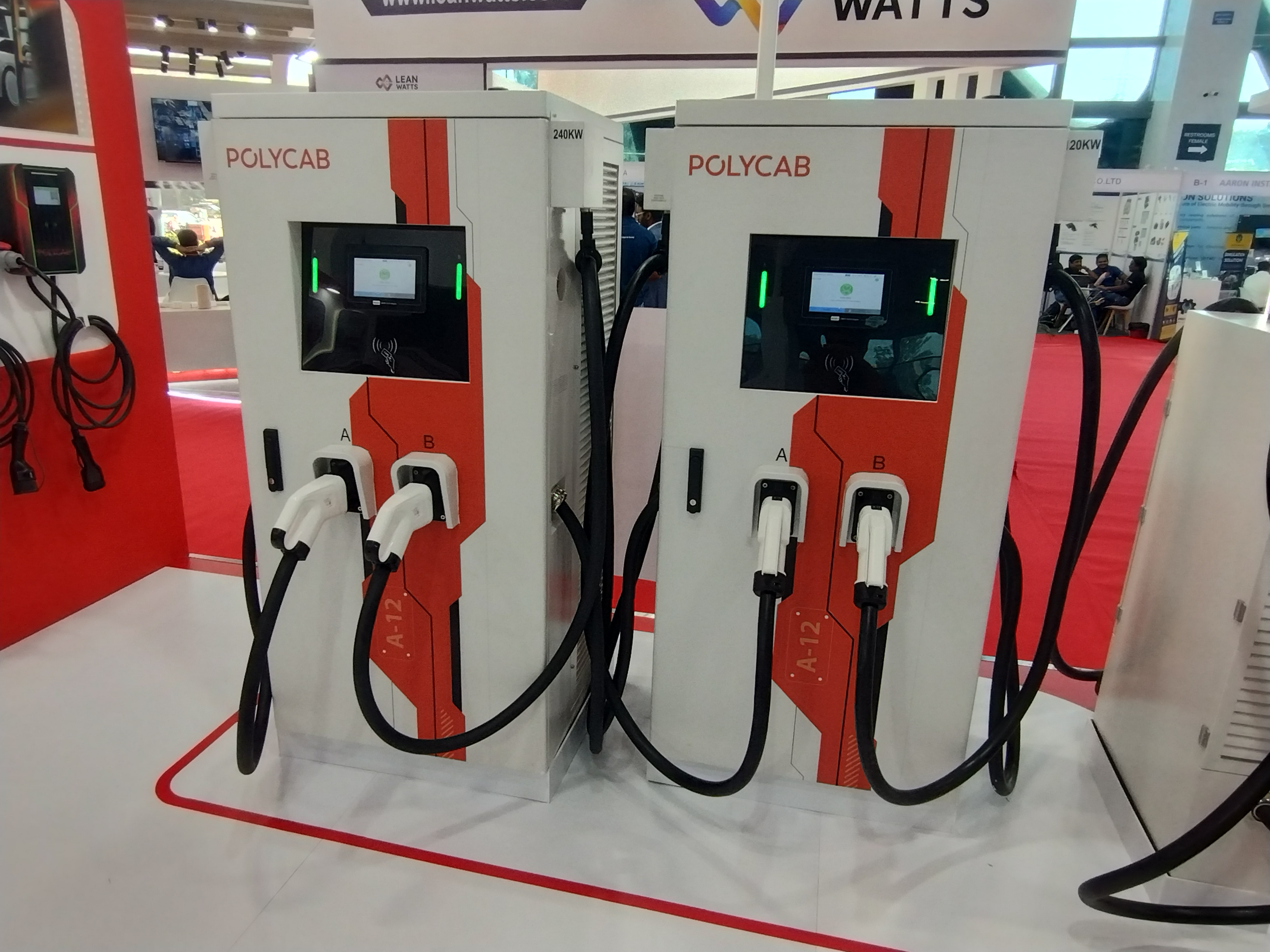
Polycab India's wires and cables at display in Auto EV Bharat 4.0

== History ==
The company's origins date back to 1964 with the establishment of Sind Electric Stores in Lohar Chawl by Thakurdas Jaisinghani, who had moved to Bombay from Pakistan after the Partition of India. This store dealt in various electrical products like fans, lighting fixtures, switches, and wires. By 1975, the company established Thakur Industries and a land was acquired from the Maharashtra Industrial Development Corporation in Andheri, Mumbai, for the construction of a cable and wire manufacturing facility.

In 1983, the company formally entered the electrical goods manufacturing sector with the founding of Polycab Industries by Inder T. Jaisinghani and his brothers. A factory was established in Halol, Gujarat, for the production of PVC insulated wires and cables, copper and aluminum, and bare copper wire.

In May 2008, the company entered into a joint venture with Nexans, a French cable manufacturer. The joint venture, with an initial investment of $37 million, focused on the production of rubber cables for the shipbuilding, railway, and wind power industries. In 2009, the company entered the engineering, procurement, and construction (EPC) sector, offering services covering the design, engineering, supply, execution, and commissioning of power distribution and rural electrification projects.

In September 2008, the International Finance Corporation, the private investment arm of the World Bank, acquired a 12% stake in Polycab Wires for ₹551.5 crore (US$120 million). This transaction valued the company's cable manufacturing business at ₹4,600 crore (US$1 billion). In 2014, Polycab India Limited expanded its product range to include electric fans, LED lighting and luminaires, switches and switchgear, solar products, and conduits and accessories.

In 2013, the company formed a joint venture with Nexans, holding a 49% stake, to establish production facilities in Gujarat. The investment for this venture amounted to $55 million (approximately ₹320 crore). In 2014, Polycab India Limited expanded its product range to include electric fans, LED lighting and luminaires, switches and switchgear, solar products, and conduits and accessories.

Polycab India Limited established a 50:50 joint venture named Ryker Base with Trafigura (Singapore) in 2016 to strengthen its backward integration for copper. The company acquired full ownership in May 2020 and subsequently, Ryker Base was acquired by Hindalco Industries, a subsidiary of the Aditya Birla Group in November 2021 for ₹323 crore.

== IPO ==
In October 2018, Polycab India filed its draft red herring prospectus (DRHP) with the Securities and Exchange Board of India for an initial public offering. The company went public in April 2019, listing on the National Stock Exchange of India and the Bombay Stock Exchange. The IPO was oversubscribed more than 52 times and raised ₹1,346 crore.

== Finance ==
The wires and cables segment accounted for 88% of the company's sales, the Fast-Moving Electrical Goods (FMEG) segment contributed 7%, and the remaining 5% came from other segments, primarily the EPC business. The company has received a long-term credit rating of AA+ (Positive) from both CRISIL and India Ratings and Research.

== Controversies ==
In December 2023, the Income Tax Department raided 50 offices of Polycab and discovered that the company had ₹1,000 crore unaccounted cash sales, ₹400 crore unaccounted cash payments made on its behalf by a distributor and ₹100 crore non-genuine expenses.

In March 2024, Polycab India's IT infrastructure was targeted by a ransomware attack attributed to the Lockbit group. The company subsequently reported that the incident did not have a significant impact on its core systems and operations.

== Awards and recognition ==
Polycab India has been listed in the Fortune India 500 list for five consecutive years, from 2019 to 2023. Inder Jaisinghani, the chairman and managing director of Polycab India, and his family were ranked at #32 in Forbes India's 2023 list of the 100 Richest Individuals, with a net worth of $6.4 billion (approximately ₹53,298 crores). Jaisinghani was also featured on the Forbes India Rich List in 2022, ranking #60 with a net worth of $3.4 billion, and in 2021, ranking #57 with a net worth of $3.6 billion.

The company has been awarded the title of "Superbrand" by Superbrands India. The company was awarded a silver medal in the Consumer Durable category at the ET Brand Equity's 2023 Trendies Awards by The Economic Times. In 2019, the Employer Branding Institute recognized Polycab India with a National Best Employer Brand Award.
