= Mysore Suryanarayana Bhatta Puttanna =

M S Puttanna
- Born: 21 November 1854; Mysore, Kingdom of Mysore, British India
- Died: Bangalore, Kingdom of Mysore, Karnataka, India
- Occupations: Teacher, Court translator, Advocate, District commissioner/revenue official, Novelist, editor, Author and translator of classical literature.

Mysore Suryanarayana Bhatta Puttanna was one of the authors of Kannada literature noted for introducing Kannada in prose form to a wider audience. Kannada had largely fallen out of use in classical form and usage as an official language, which was attributed to the reign of Haider Ali and Tipu Sultan when Urdu was used. Thus, in the late 19th century, Kannada was mainly used in matters of commerce and personal communication. He was involved in its cultural resurrection during the late 19th and early 20th century.

His literary works include the first translations of major works in English to Kannada such as The History of Sandford and Merton by Thomas Day, Hamlet and King Lear.

== Early life ==
M.S. Puttanna (Mysore Suryanarayana Bhatta Puttanna) was born on 21 November 1854 in Mysore, Kingdom of Mysore, as a member of the Hoysala Karnataka Brahmin caste to Suryanarayana and Lakshamma in the parental home of his mother. His given birth name was Lakshmi Narasimha Sastry, but he became known as Puttanna (translates to 'younger big brother') by those around him.

== Education ==
M.S. Puttanna was educated at home in Mysore by a private Panth teacher. Later he joined the Raja School, which was subsequently renamed Maharaja's College, Mysore after its chief patron, Krishnaraja Wadiyar III the Maharaja of Mysore. There he passed the F.A. (First Arts) examination, which is the equivalent of present-day pre-university.

After working as a teacher, he was admitted to Presidency College, Madras. He graduated from college in 1885 with a Bachelors in Arts degree, majoring in Ethics and Logic.

== Career ==
M.S. Puttanna began his career in Kolar High School in 1878 teaching literature. He was granted a transfer to his alma mater, Raja School Mysore, where he resumed teaching. While teaching at the Raja School he enrolled in classes towards his BA in Ethics and Logic.

After graduating from college in 1885, he left his teaching post and took a job as a court translator in the Chief Court of the Kingdom of Mysore, known today as the High Court of Mysore, translating legal documents from English to Kannada and vice versa. He held this job until 1897.

In 1897 he was appointed to be the Amildar(administrator of a group of villages) in the Taluk of Chitradurga, Kingdom of Mysore. He later served in the capacity of Amildar in the Mysore Taluks of Nelamangala, Chamrajnagar, Bagepalli, Mulabagal and Hosadurga.

While serving as Amildar and advocate, M.S. Puttanna began his literary career around the end of the 19th century. M.S. Puttanna authored 29 works of Kannada literature. His works are associated with the two prominent phases of Kannada literature. One was 'Arunodaya' (pre-renaissance) and the other, 'Navodaya' (renaissance) which overlapped in his lifetime. In addition to his commitment to full-time authorship, he served as editor and contributing author to a monthly literary journal called 'Hitha Bodhini' which loosely translates to 'Teaching the Good' or 'Wise Counsel’.

In Kannada literature he is known to be one of the pioneers of the use of colloquial or common language, effectively broadening the appeal of the language to a wider readership. He was the first Kannada author to record in a biography, the life of a local Kannadiga personage, Kunigal Rama Sastry. He was also the first to translate the works of Thomas Day and William Shakespeare from English to Kannada. He translated 'The Adventures of Hatim Tai' by Duncan Forbes (originally written in 1824). Together with his friend H.V. Nanjundaiah, M.S. Puttanna worked for the founding of the Kannada Sahitya Sammelana (Kannada Literary Institute) in Chamrajpet, Bangalore and served as its first secretary.

Based on his prior experience as Amildar, he worked as a secretary for the ‘Ratepayers Association’ (equivalent of today's Tax Revenue Board) preparing reports and chairing meetings held in Kannada. He also supported equal rights for all in the Kingdom of Mysore and demonstrated this by personally honoring a select group of soldiers from all castes at his home in Basavanagudi, Bangalore (where a street is named for him) on their return from action in Europe after the Great War.

== Death ==
M.S. Puttanna died at age 76 in Bangalore, Kingdom of Mysore in 1930.

== Bibliography ==
- 'Madiddunno Maharaya' (novel), published 1915 (translation: 'You Reap What You Sow').
- 'Musuga Tegiye Mayangane' (novel), published 1928 (translation: 'Remove Thy Veil, O Beauty!').
- 'Avarilla Duta' (novel), posthumously published 1959 (translation: 'Meals Without My Husband').
- 'Niti Chintamani' (collection of over 150 children's stories), published 1884, in collaboration with MB Srinivasa Iyengar.
- 'Kunigala Ramasastri Gala Charitre' (biography), published 1910 (translation: 'The Story of Kunigala Ramasastri')
- 'Hemachandra Rajavilasa' (English to Kannada translation), published 1899 (translation: 'King Lear' by William Shakespeare)
- 'Hemalatha Rajakumara Charitre' (English to Kannada translation), posthumously published 2009 (translation: 'Hamlet' by William Shakespeare).
- 'Sumathi Madana Kumara' (English to Kannada translation), published 1897 (translation: 'The History of Sandford And Merton' by Thomas Day)
- 'Paleyagararu' (research monograph), published 1923 (translation: 'Chieftain')
- 'Kannada Ondaneya Pustakavu' (textbook), published 1895 (translation: 'Elementary Kannada Texbook')
- 'M.S. Puttannanavara Kannada Mattu English Lekhanagalu' (articles and essays), posthumously published 2003 (translation: 'A collection of Kannada and English essays and articles by M.S. Puttanna')
