= Tapal Tea =

Pakistani tea company

- Type: Private
- Industry: Tea
- Founded: November 1947; 78 years ago in Karachi, Pakistan
- Founder: Adam Ali Tapal
- Headquarters: Karachi, Pakistan
- Area served: Pakistan; Saudi Arabia
- Key people: Aftab Tapal (chairman)
- Products: Danedar; Family Mixture; Tezdum; Mezban
- Revenue: ▲ Rs. 4482.23 crore (US$160 million) (2020)
- Website: tapaltea.com

Tapal Tea is a Pakistani family-owned tea business headquartered in Karachi. It is one of the largest tea brands in Pakistan.

== History ==
Tapal Tea was founded by Adam Ali Tapal in November 1947 as a retail outlet at Jodia Bazaar, originally importing tea from Ceylon.

In 1975, Aftab Tapal joined the family business. He introduced improvements in packaging to better compete with international companies. During his tenure, Tapal diversified its imports by introducing Kenyan tea and expanded its product range to include both granular tea aimed at the urban middle class and more affordable tea dust for the rural areas.

In 2004, Tapal expanded their operations in Saudi Arabia. Tapal exports tea to 20 countries.

== Products ==
- Chenak (1984)
- Mezban (1988)
- Danedar
- Family Mixture
- Tezdum

== Research Lab ==
The company carries out research and development activity involving different tea leaf grading at its Tapal Tea Lab.

== Tapal Energy ==
The Tapal family also have energy investments in the form of a 126-megawatt furnace oil powered diesel reciprocating generator in Karachi near Hub and wind and solar operations.
