= Vidyarthi Bhavan =

Vegetarian tiffin restaurant in Gandhi Bazaar, Basavanagudi, South Bangalore

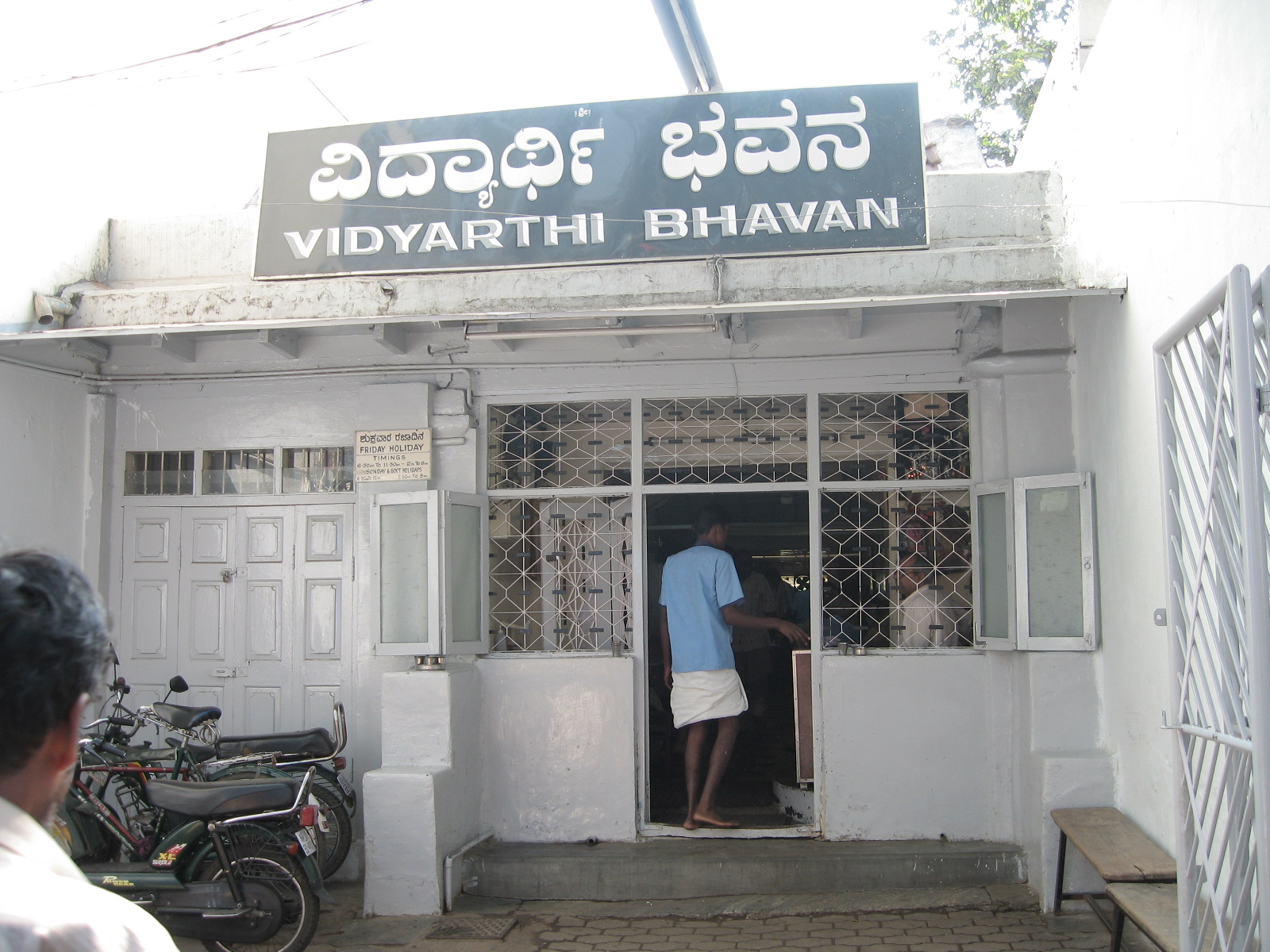
Vidyarthi Bhavan Entrance

Vidyarthi Bhavan (Kannada: Vidyārthi Bhavana; lit. 'Student House') is a vegetarian tiffin restaurant in Gandhi Bazaar, Basavanagudi, South Bangalore. It has been considered an iconic establishment of the area and Bangalore in general, with its masala dosa being particularly recognized.

== History ==
It was founded in 1943 by Venketarama Ural to serve students who originally hailed from outside the city who were attending the nearby Acharya Pathasala Public School and National College in addition to other schools in Gandhi Bazaar, an area known for having a high concentration of educational institutions. At that time, newly opened restaurants would be given names that featured the word "Bhavan" (Bhavana; lit. 'House') at the end, which led to the establishment gaining its name. Later, Parameshwara Udal took over before selling it to current owner Ramakrishna Adiga in 1970.

The Adigas trademarked the Vidyarthi Bhavan name in 2008, and ten years later sued two restaurants with similar names.

Vidhyarthi Bhavan celebrated its 75th anniversary in 2018 with a silver jubilee celebration and by releasing a coffee table book, and India Post released a special postal cover and stamp the same year.

== Food and reputation ==
The restaurant features a limited menu of South Indian breakfast items and is known for keeping its decor and food as close to its original state as possible. It is particularly noted for its crispy and buttery masala dosa, considered its signature dish. Arun Adiga, Ramakrishna's son, attributes its taste to using different proportions of red rice, methi and urad dal in the recipe compared to other places. The restaurant is also known for its clientele, with writers in particular patronizing the restaurant and using it as a "creative meeting space". At peak times, the restaurant is so popular that customers have to wait outside before their name is called to enter and often end up sharing tables.

== See also ==
- Bangalore
- Cuisine of Karnataka
