= Hanumanthana gudda =

Ramanjaneya gudda
- Neighbourhood temple
- Location within Bengaluru
- Country: India
- State: Karnataka
- Metro: Bangalore
- Time zone: UTC+5:30 (IST)
- PIN: 560019

Hanumanthana gudda or Ramanjaneya gudda means the "Hill of Lord Hanuman". It is located in Hanumanth nagar (next to Basavanagudi) near Bangalore, India. A major temple dedicated to Lord Hanuman is located here and was built in 1960s.

== Description ==
The slopes of the hill have numerous trees and bushy plants. Gardens are also present on the back side of the hill, where the slope is not too steep. Two walkways with stairs are available to reach the top of the hill. They are paved with granite slabs and well maintained. There is also a road to the summit.

Inside the temple there is an eight foot high Murthi of Hanuman in which the Lord is standing at ease with his weapon, the Gadhe(Gada (mace)). On the top of the temple, there are giant statues of Lord Hanuman and Lord Rama hugging each other, as it is related they did after the conquest of Lanka. This gigantic statue is a symbol of the dedication and loyalty Lord Hanuman showed towards Lord Rama.

== Residential area ==
The residential layout built adjoining the hill was named "Hanumantha nagara", after the late Shri. Kengal Hanumanthaiah, former Chief Minister of Karnataka, who was one of the patrons of this temple.
