= Dava Bazaar =

Dava Bazaar भायखळा
- Market
- Location within Mumbai
- Coordinates: 18.946882°N 72.831362°E
- Country: India
- State: Maharashtra
- Metro: Mumbai

Languages
  - Official: Marathi
- Time zone: UTC+5:30 (IST)
- PIN: 400002
- Area code: 022
- Vehicle registration: MH 01
- Civic agency: BMC

Dava Bazaar (also spelled Dawa Bazaar and Dava Bazar) is an area in South Mumbai famous for medical and scientific instruments, and lab chemicals. It is located near Lohar Chawl, Crawford Market and opens into Princess Street. Dava in Hindi means medicine.

The word Aushadhi Khana has generic usage as pharmaceutical trade markets in various parts of India.
