= Gandhi Bazaar =

Market area in Basavanagudi, Bangalore, India

Coordinates: 12°56′45″N 77°34′15″E

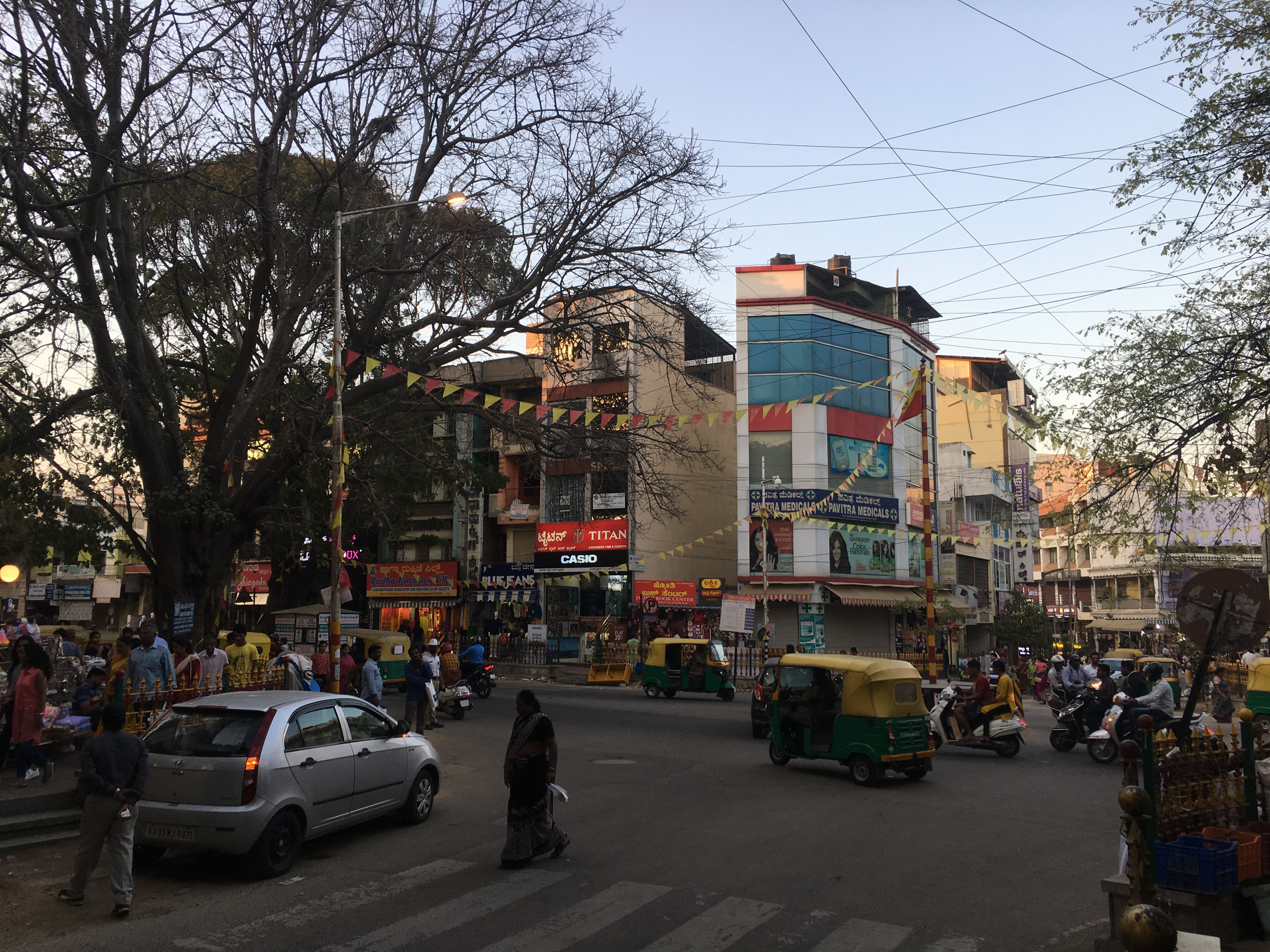
Gandhi Bazaar Circle

Gandhi Bazaar is a busy market area in Basavanagudi, Bangalore, known mainly for its flower and condiment hawker shops. One of the oldest areas in the city, Gandhi Bazaar is said to be traditional and conservative. The area also houses many temples; fruit, vegetable and cloth stores; and restaurants, including the Vidyarthi Bhavan which was started in 1943. The market typically functions from 6 a.m. to 9 p.m., with an increased crowd during festival periods for buying puja items. DVG Road, which has some of the oldest business outlets in the city, runs through the centre of Gandhi Bazaar and is the commercial centre of Basavanagudi.

Kannada writer Masti Venkatesha Iyengar was a resident of this locality.

== See also ==
- VV Puram Food Street
