= Zainab Market =

Market in Karachi, Pakistan

Zainab Market is a historic market in Karachi, Pakistan.

== Building ==
Zainab Market is a three-tiered commercial building known for its wide range of products. The ground floor is primarily for vendors, the basement houses specialty stores, and the first floor features leather goods and furs. The market provides an array of items such as ceremonial clothes, traditional jewelry, crafts, and home decor.

The building is characterized by its maze-like structure which was built during British India-era.
