= Rajdhani, Kotli =

Rajdhani
- Village and union council
- Location in Azad Kashmir
- Coordinates: 33°22′0″N 73°46′58″E
- Sovereign state: Pakistan
- Dependent territory: Azad Kashmir
- District: Kotli District

Government
  - Type: Union council
  - MNA: Raja Farooq Khan (PMLN AJK)
- Elevation: 2,030 ft (620 m)
- Time zone: UTC+5 (PST)
  - Summer (DST): +6

Rajdhani (Urdu: دمارہمغب) is a union council in the Kotli District, Azad Kashmir, 40 kilometres (25 mi) west of the city of Kotli, the capital of the Kotli District and 64 kilometres (40 mi) north of Azad Kashmir's rapidly expanding model city of Mirpur. The Kotli-Mirpur Main Road passes through the village.

A large portion of the residents of Rajdhani who have emigrated to Europe reside in Huddersfield, Rochdale, and Oldham and surrounding areas in the United Kingdom.

Rajdhani is located in the south of the Kotli District at an elevation of 620 metres (2,040ft). The village has a population of approximately 2500, and the dominant group in the village is Rajput. The ancestral founders of Rajdhani belong to the caste Rajput. Like most of the southern districts of Azad Kashmir, the majority of the population are ethnic Pothoharis.

The first man to travel from Rajdhani to the UK was Haji Farman Ali in the 1940s and was also a member of the British Army and UK Merchant Navy. Haji Farman Ali toured all over the world often bringing back souvenirs to share with friends and family. The first woman to emigrate from Rajdhani to the UK is Zubaida Begum who originally settled in Bradford with her late husband, Bagh Ali, in the early 1960s and currently resides in Huddersfield.

== Neighbourhoods and localities ==
- Kass
- Barootian
- Andral
- Khali Paeli
- Paryani
- Nala
- Thangri
- Tamote
- Mohala Mistrian
- Riapur
- Rakha
- Dutwala
- Ghoga
- Mochian
- Nayian
- Luman
- Nakka
- Muqadama / Mocha
- Ikri
- Kanjalan
- Banni Kalooni
- Parat Camp
- Banni Kalooni
- Choki
- Bindi
- Bhunna Mora
- Parat Choki
- Passar
- Mohala Piran
- Kassi
- Chanch
- Gala Bazaar
- Darzian
- Mehara
- Moori
- Bazi Gharan
- Shoounti Kalooni
- Gujran ni Paeli
- Dangrala
- Kanyat
- Siran ni Paeli
- Kalyian
- Satoie na Nakka
- Burgial
- Khara Dumb
- Ambali Pahara
- Palani
- Agla Bazaar
- Karmal
- Tomot
