= Khaireni =

Khaireni is a Bazar at Hasara in Gulmi district, Nepal. It has a government hospital. The nearest school is Shree Satyawati Higher Secondary School.
