= Jodia Bazaar =

Jodia Bazaar جوڑیا بازار
- Bazaar
- Country: Pakistan
- Province: Sindh
- City: Karachi

Jodia Bazaar (Urdu: جوڑیا بازار) is a bazaar located in Karachi, Pakistan. The bazaar comprises a wholesale market for commodities including flour, wheat, rice, sugar, and legumes.

Jodia Bazaar is also known as the main market of hand fans in Pakistan. In recent years, traders associated with Jodia Bazaar have adopted online platforms to coordinate wholesale trade.

== History ==
Jodia Bazaar was established in 1947 after independence.

In 2014, it was estimated that the market worth of daily trading is between Rs. 3 and Rs. 5 billion.

== Shops ==
Some of the largest sugar merchants of Pakistan are based in Jodia Bazaar. Some of the shops are owned by emigrants from India.

Tapal Tea, one of the largest Tea company in Pakistan, started its business with a small shop in Jodia Bazaar.
