= Shihura Khurd Kalan =

Shihura khud kalan Sihura khud kalan
- Village
- Nickname: Sihura
- Location in Uttar Pradesh, India
- Coordinates: 28.276883°N 80.250564°E
- Country: India
- State: Uttar Pradesh
- District: Shahjahanpur
- Established: 1790
- Founder: Mr. Girdhari Lal Dixit

Government
  - Type: Democracy
  - Body: Gram Panchayat
  - Pradhan: Prabhjeet Singh
  - Secretary: Anurag verma
  - Gram Rojgar Sevak: Jalaj Pandey

Area
  - Total: 0.106 km^{2} (0.041 sq mi)
- Elevation: 169 m (554 ft)

Population (2016)
  - Total: 1,183
  - Density: 11,200/km^{2} (28,900/sq mi)

Languages
  - Official: Hindi
- Time zone: UTC+5:30 (IST)
- Postal Pin: 242405
- Vehicle registration: UP 27
- Website: http://akonlineworks.tk/

Shihura Khurd Kalan is a village and a Panchayat in Block -Khutar, Shahjahanpur district in the Indian state of Uttar Pradesh. Lucknow is the state capital for Sihura Khurd Kalan village. It is located around 186.4 kilometer away from Sihura Khurd Kalan.. The other nearest state capital from Sihura Khurd Kalan is Delhi and its distance is 350.2 km. The other surrounding state capitals are Lucknow 175.0 km., Dehradun 307.8 km., Chandigarh 439.1 km. The surrounding nearby villages and its distance from sihura are mahua mania 1 km, Longapur 1 km, Mohanpur 2 km, Moradpur niviya kheda, bakundhapur 1 km, Punoutee 1.5 KMDhakna lahiya 5 km etc.

== Shihura Gram Punchayat Bhavan ==
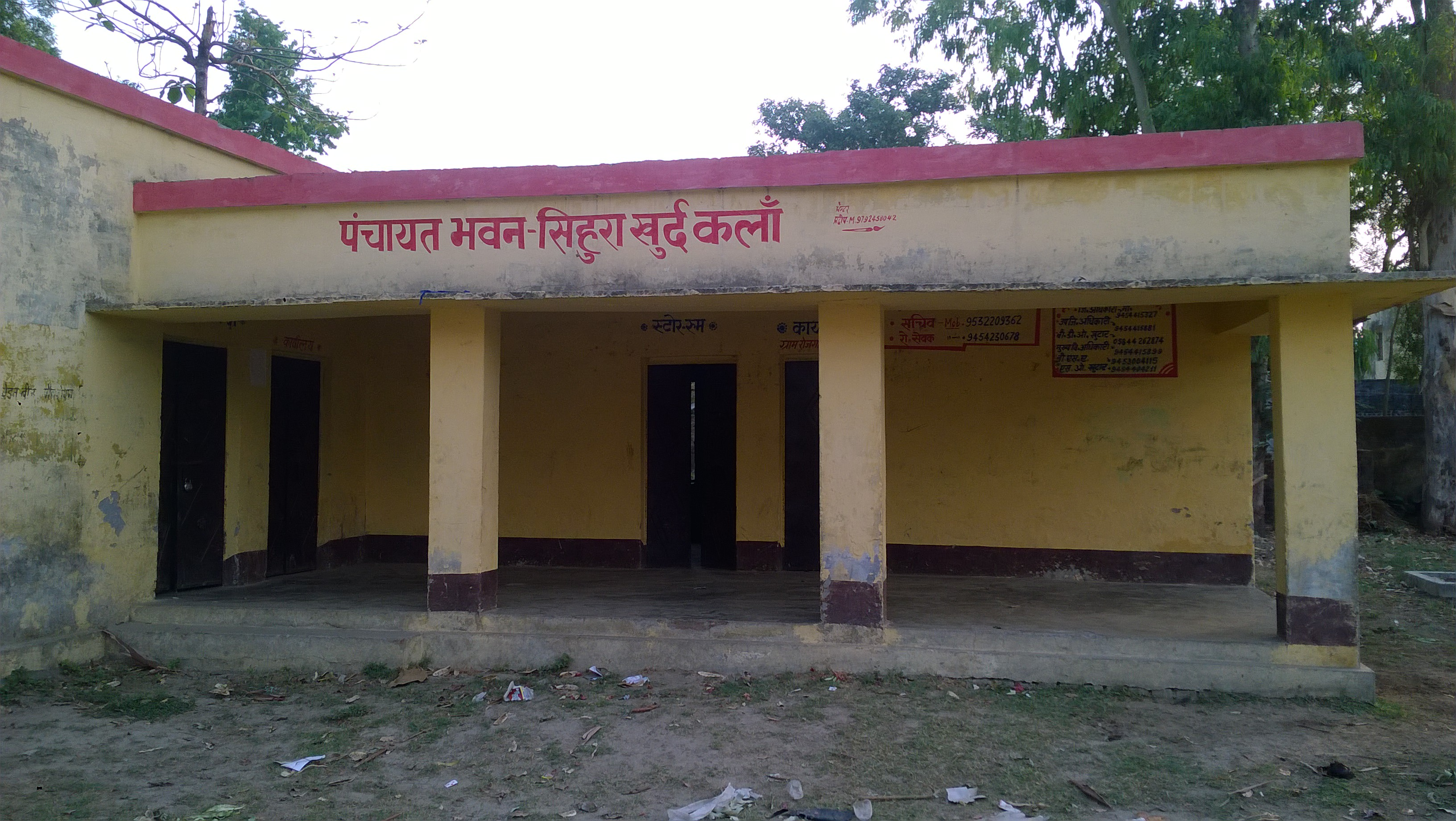
Shihura Gram Punchayat Bhavan

Shihura is a gram panchayat in which five villages are located. The names of the villages are Shihura Khurd Kalan, Mahua Mainiya, Baikundhapur, Dalippur and Lohangapur. The total population of Shihura Gram Punchayat is 1749. Gram puchayat bhavan is near to the sabzi bazaar and temple. Many problems and policies are discussed in gram panchayat bhavan.

=== Gram Pradhan list ===
- Mr. Ram Ratan Lal Dixit (1991 to 1996)
- Mr. Mohan LaL (ex. pradhan) (1996 to 2001)
- Mr. Ram Avatar Kushwaha (ex. pradhan) (2001 to 2006)
- Mr. Harbhajan Singh (ex. pradhan) (2006 to 2011)
- Mrs. Rekha Devi w/o Deepu Singh (ex. pradhan) (2011 to 2016)
- Mr. Shiri Pal (ex.pradhan)(2016 to 2021)
- Mr.Parvjeet singh (current Pradhan) (2021- till now)

== Geography ==
Shihura is located at 28.2°N 80.28°E. It has an average elevation of 169 metres (531 feet). Dudhwa National Park is 60 km away and Gola Gokhran Nath (Chota Kashi) is 32 km away.

The latitude 28.2761211028683 and longitude 80.25268292374676 are the geocoordinate of sihura.

== Demographics ==
As of 2001 India census, Shihura had a population of 1183 and category wise there are 340 in SC, 643 in OBC and remaining 200 in General category . Males constitute 56.49% of the population and females 43.51%. Shihura has an average literacy rate of 22%, lower than the national average of 59.5%: male literacy is 58%, and female literacy is 32%. In Shihura 18% of the population is under 6 years of age.

== School and educational institutes ==
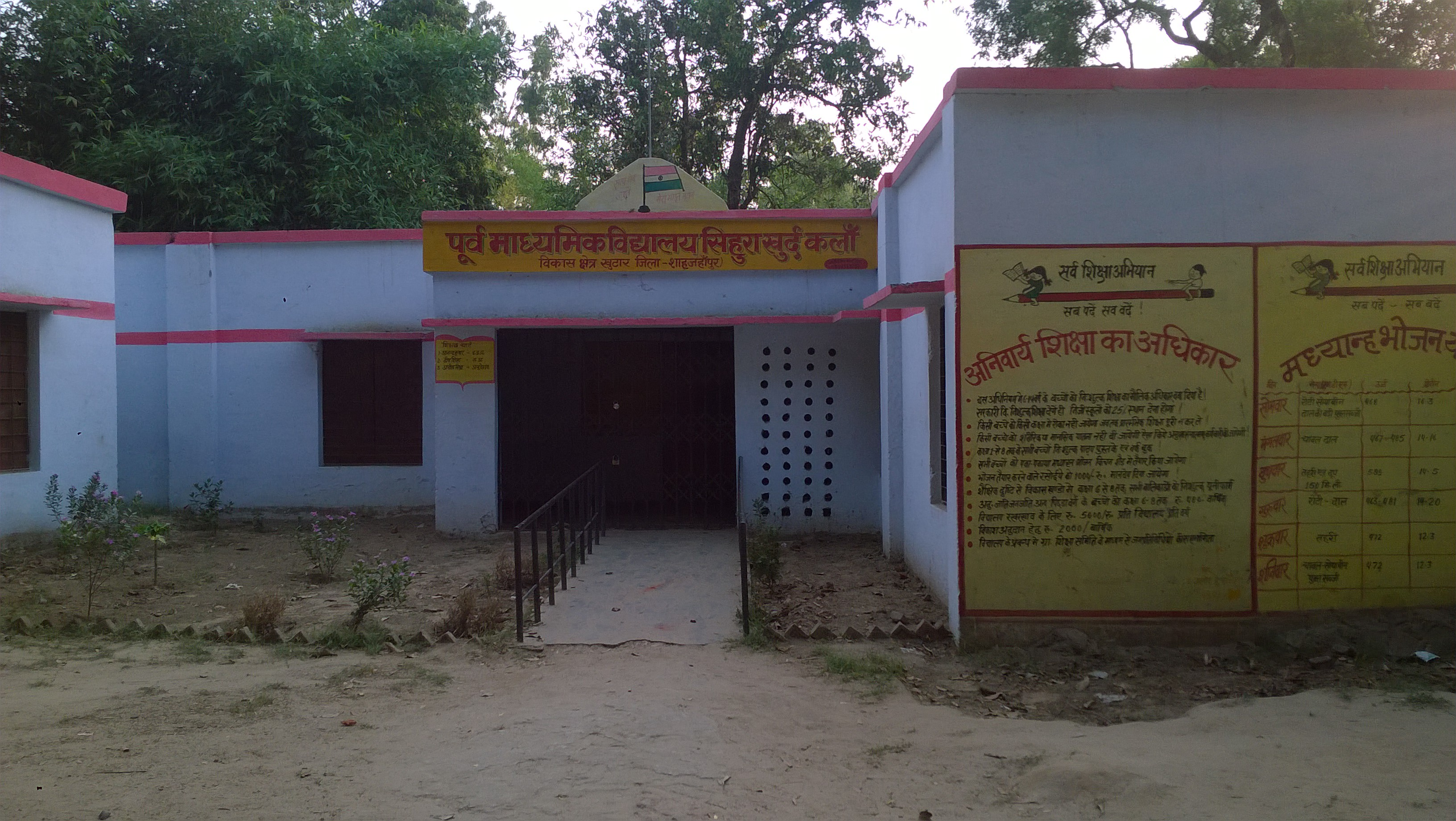
Junior High School Sihura Khurd Kalan

In this Village, there are only two schools: Primary School and Junior High School.

== Sabzi Bazaar and Temple ==
There is Sabzi Bazaar, arranged by Mr. Ramratan Lal Dixit (ex. pradhan). and a temple which is also built by Mr. Ramratan Lal Dixit (ex. pradhan)
