= Russian Bazaar, Ashgabat =

One of the largest and oldest covered markets in Turkmenistan

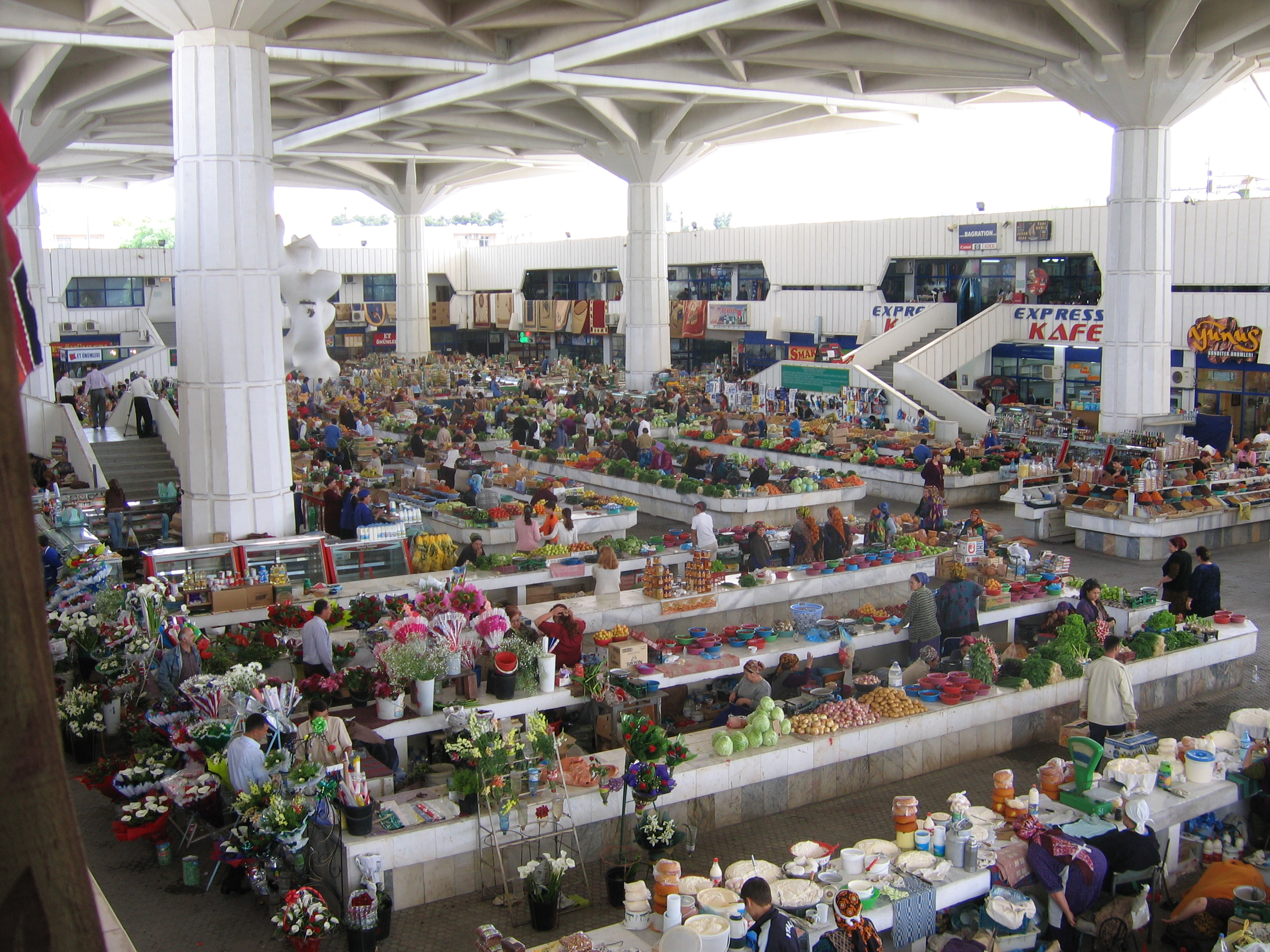

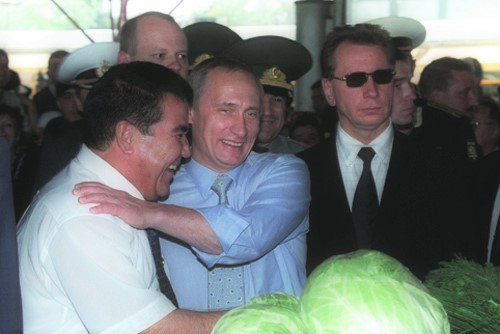
Vladimir Putin and Saparmurat Niyazov in Russian Bazaar

The Russian Bazaar or Gulistan (Turkmen: Gulistan söwda merkezi; Rus bazary, Гулистан сөвда меркези; Рус базары) in Ashgabat is one of the largest and oldest covered markets in the Turkmenistan. It is located in the centre of the city. The "Russian Bazaar" was built in the period of 1972—1982 by the design of the Russian architect Vladimir Visotin among other buildings that were included in the "Ashgabat Reconstruction Program of 1970-1980." The building was done in the Soviet Modernism style and decorated by the Turkmen sculptor Klych Yarmamedov who adored the building with a magnificent abstract sculpture placed in one of the building's corners. Despite the emergence of new stores and malls in Ashgabat, markets continue to be popular among locals and tourists and are regularly visited by foreign delegations. The range of goods is enormous, and the bazaar also houses shops and eateries. In 2001 it was reconstructed by the Turkish company Ekol, with updated outlets, shops and foodstalls. The complex was covered with white marble. In 2007, there was a fire in the clothing section of the market.

== See also ==
- Bazaar
- Bazaari
- Market (place)
- Retail
- Souq
