= Boi Bazar =

Bazaar on the border of Kashmir and Pakistan

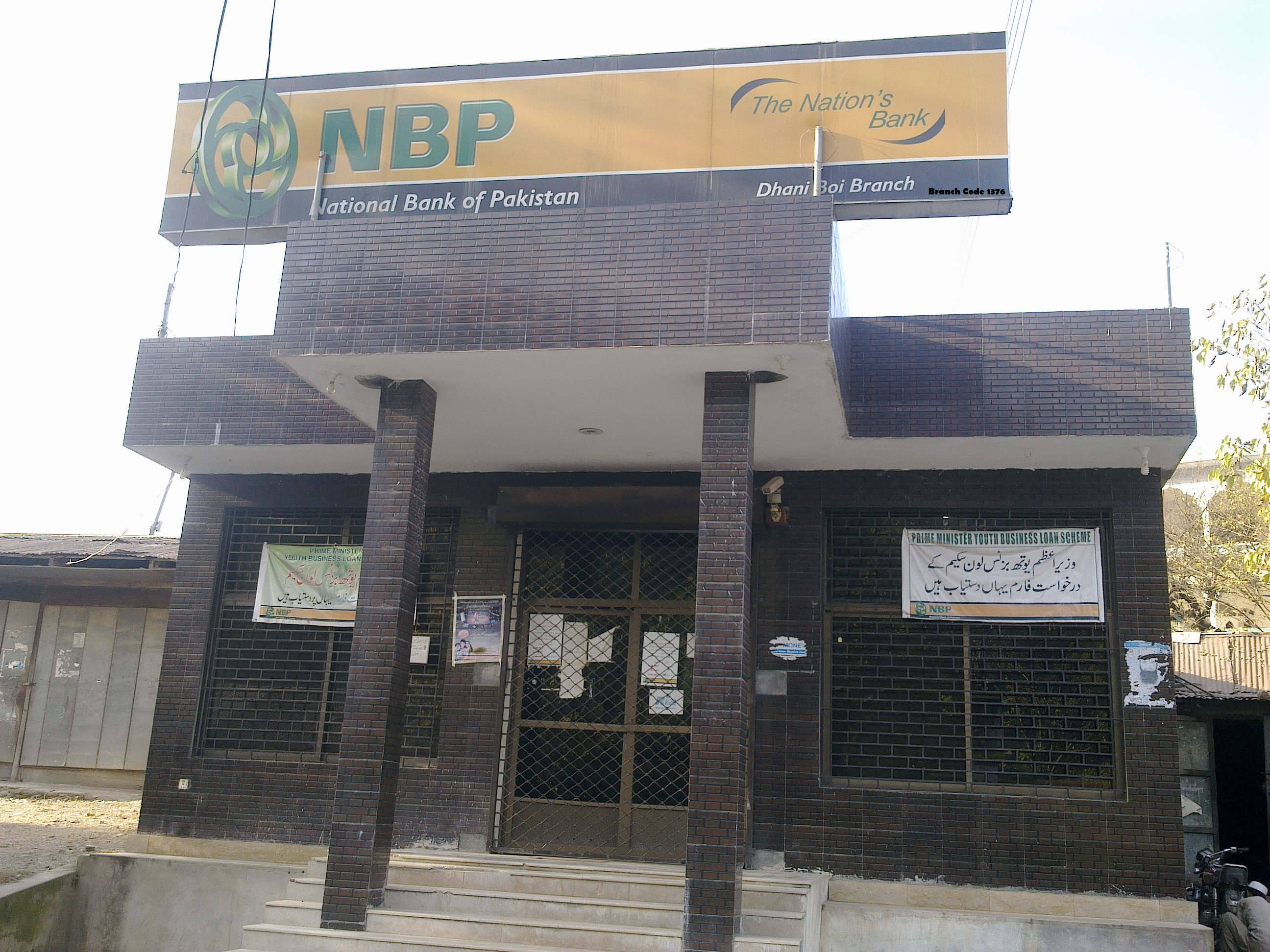
National Bank of Pakistan branch in Boi Bazar

Boi Bazaar, located at Kashmir Point, also called the Kashmiri Bazaar, is a popular bazaar at the border of Kashmir and Boi, Abbottabad District, Pakistan. In operation for almost 100 years, the bazaar is known for walnuts, expensive herbal plants and wood carvings. Thousands of traders arriving from Balakot have opened outlets in the bazaar.

The Sungi Development Foundation has a presence in the Bazar, as Boi Bazar is located next to a river and in an area at risk of flooding, a public address system was installed in the bazar.
