= Old Bazaar, Bitola =

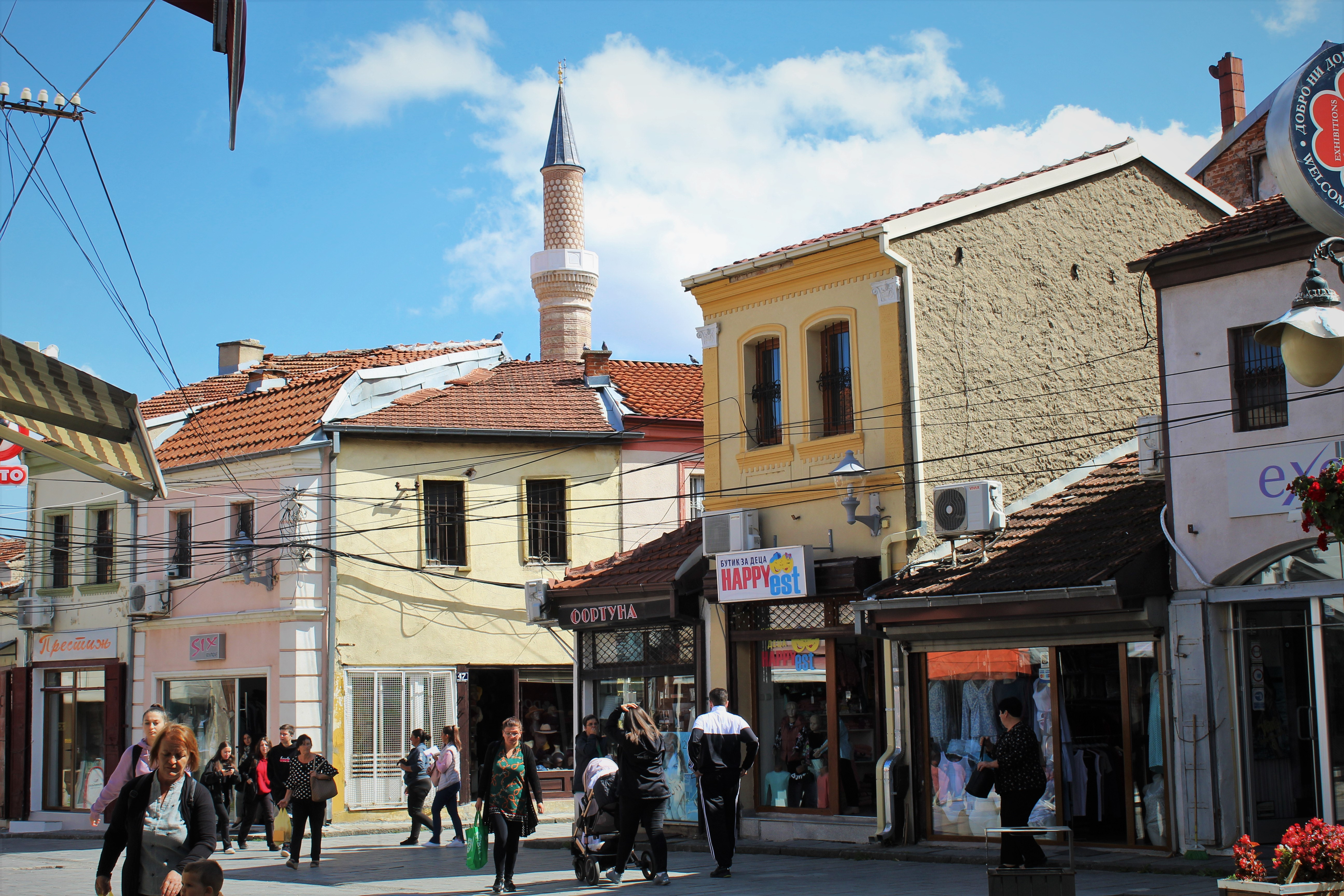
Streets and shops in the Old Bazaar

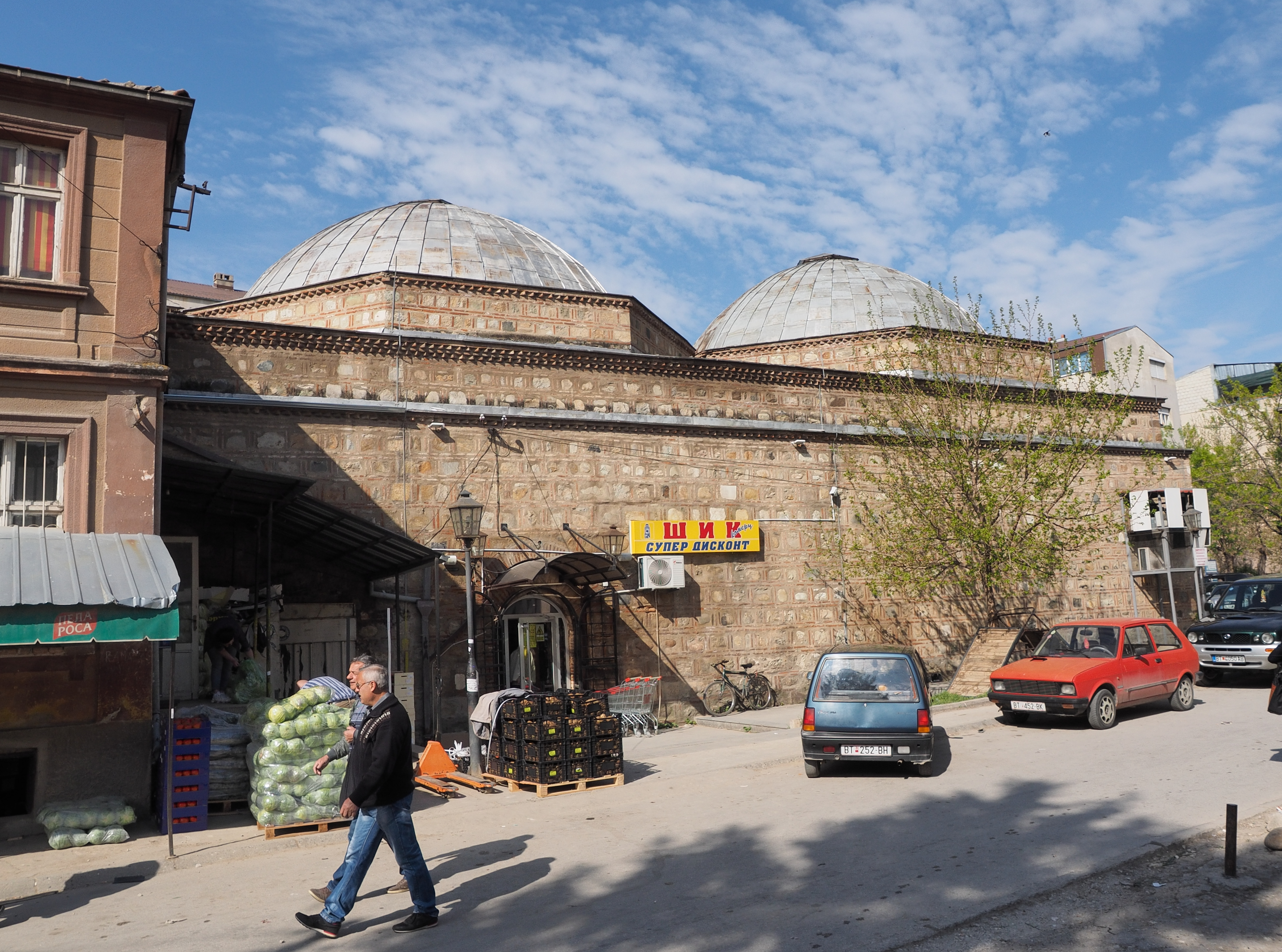
The Deboj Hamam

The Old Bazaar (Macedonian: Стара чаршија, romanized: Stara čaršija) is a bazaar located in Bitola, North Macedonia, situated on the northern bank of the Dragor River in the centre of the city. The bazaar has served as a centre of trade activity for Bitola since the 15th century. As the third-most important European city in the mid-19th century Ottoman Empire after Istanbul and Thessaloniki, Bitola had over 2,000 shops with roughly 140 different crafts and professions present.

The bazaar in its entirety is listed as an Object of Cultural Heritage by the Ministry of Culture, while several houses, commercial buildings, mosques, and hamams within it are also listed individually.

== Landmarks ==
=== Bezisten ===
Opposite the Clock Tower across the Dragor River, the bezisten is a covered market. Built with the appearance of a fortress, it housed a variety of shops and the studios of the prominent artists of the city.

=== Deboj Hamam ===
The Deboj Hamam was built in the 17th or early 18th century. It consists of two main rooms. The hamam was later used as a warehouse for various goods.

=== Gazi Hajdar Kadi Mosque ===
North of the present boundary of the Old Bazaar, the Gazi Hajdar Kadi Mosque was built in 1561. It features a main dome, a portico capped by three cupolas, and one minaret.

=== Ishak Çelebi Mosque ===
On the western end of the bazaar, the Ishak Çelebi Mosque is across the street from the bezisten. Built in 1506, it is the largest mosque in Bitola.

=== Kerim Bey Hamam ===
Also known simply as the Old Turkish Hamam, water was brought in from the Dragor with pipes and was heated with wood. Prior to World War II, it was primarily used by the Jews of Bitola.
