= Shyauli Bazaar =

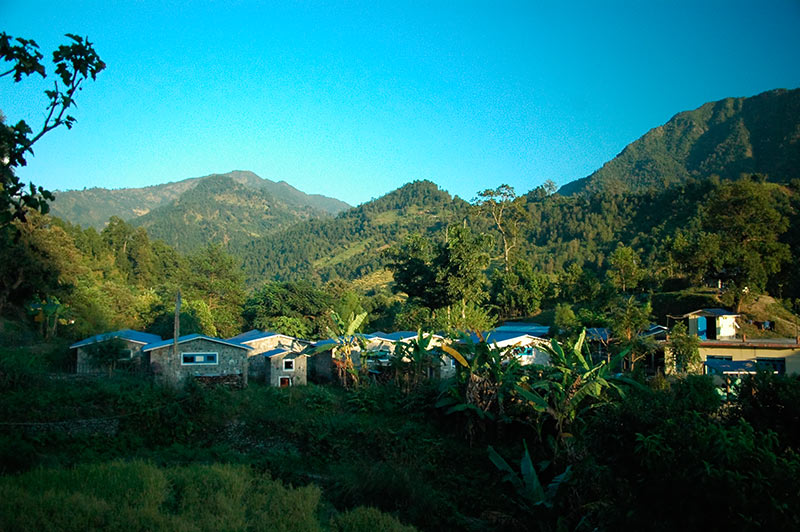
Shyauli Bazaar
Country:	Nepal
Province:	Gandaki
District:	Lamjung
Coordinates:	28°10′38″N 84°16′05″E
Time zone:	UTC+5:45
Elevation:	550m

Shyauli Bazaar in Karapu, Ward No.9 Lamjung District is located at the river Middim Khola, 30 km east of Pokhara in Nepal. The tiny village is inside the range of the geographic middle of Nepal. geo:lat=28.103935006866482 geo:lon=84.22874987125397

A trekking path that starts at the Begnas Lake east of Pokhara leads alongside the village and up to Nalma and Kudi at the Annapurna Round Trek. In Shyauli Bazaar is the only Search and Rescue Dog Handlers Academy in South East Asia.
