= Sarafa Bazaar =

Market in Indore, India

Sarafa Bazaar सर्राफा बाज़ार
- Location: Indore, Madhya Pradesh, India
- Goods sold: Food, Cuisine and Jewellery
- Number of tenants: 194
- Interactive map of Sarafa Bazaar

Sarafa Bazaar (English: Sarafa Market) is a jewellery market and night street food court located in central Indore, India. Sarafa is one of the market in India which remains as a jewellery marketplace at daytime and converts itself into a street food court at night. The market consists of two sub-markets namely Bada Sarafa Bazaar and Chhota Sarafa Bazaar. Indore's Sarafa Bazaar is a popular tourist place because of its diverse cuisine and night lifestyle.

== History ==
The market originated as the central jewellery market in the city of Indore. Located 2 Kilometres from Indore's central marketplace Rajwada, Sarafa was the central trading point for jewellery, artefacts and ornaments. Due to its location and a large number of commuters and tourists, street food vendors started putting stalls and selling fast-food, snacks and chaat. Eventually, street food vendors were allowed to put stalls after 8 PM (after jewellery market closes) until morning. Sarafa is also the place of origin of Bada Sarafa Cotton Association, Indore and Madhya Pradesh Sarafa Association.

== Cuisine ==
The following are the most popular recipes for with the court is famous for:

- Bhutte ka Kees
- Jalebi
- Ratalu
- Khopra Pattice
- Garadu
- Poha-Jalebi
- Malpua
- Rabri
- kachori vijay chat house
- Kulfi
- Mawa Baati
- Malai Rabdi
- Coconut Crush

Some popular vendors include Joshi Ke Dahi Bade (since 1977) (Joshi's Dahi Bade), Nagori Ki Shikanji (Nagori's Shikanjvi) and Rajhans ka Daal Bafla (Rajhans' Daal Baati).

== Sarafa in Smart City Project ==
Smart City Indore is an initiative launched by Indore Municipal Corporation, which includes the participation of residents to qualify Indore to the Smart City Mission launched by the Government of India in first round by taking suggestions and feedback from the residents. Indore is shortlisted by the Ministry of Urban Development as one of the 100 cities under Smart City Mission. The project aims to emphasize development in various sectors including Governance, Transportation, Energy & Waste Management, Water Management, Finance, Health & Education, Infrastructure, and Heritage.

Sarafa Bazaar and the Rajwada suburb are selected as the regions to be developed under the initiative. The Indore Municipal Corporation and Indore Development Authority have started working on underground ducts for the overhead cables in the region.
