= Urdu Bazaar, Karachi =

Retail market in Karachi, Pakistan

Urdu Bazaar, Karachi اردو بازار، کراچی
- Bazaar
- Country: Pakistan
- Province: Sindh
- City: Karachi (located in Saddar Town)
- Founded: 1950s

Urdu Bazaar, Karachi (Urdu: اردو بازار، کراچی) is a bazaar located in Saddar Town, Karachi, Pakistan.

It is considered as one of the oldest and most prestigious historical book markets in Pakistan.

A variety of books, both used and new books, are available in the market, including books on art, history, literature, philosophy, religion, and science.

Urdu Bazaar is also known for its book festival.

== History ==
Origins of the first Urdu bazaar dates back to the Mughal era at Red Fort, Delhi - this location in Karachi of Urdu Bazaar was founded in the 1950s. Initially, the marketplace was composed of just a few stalls operated by the immigrants, but it gradually grew and moved to M.A. Jinnah Road, Saddar, Karachi where it is still located.
