= Basavanagudi =

- Neighbourhood
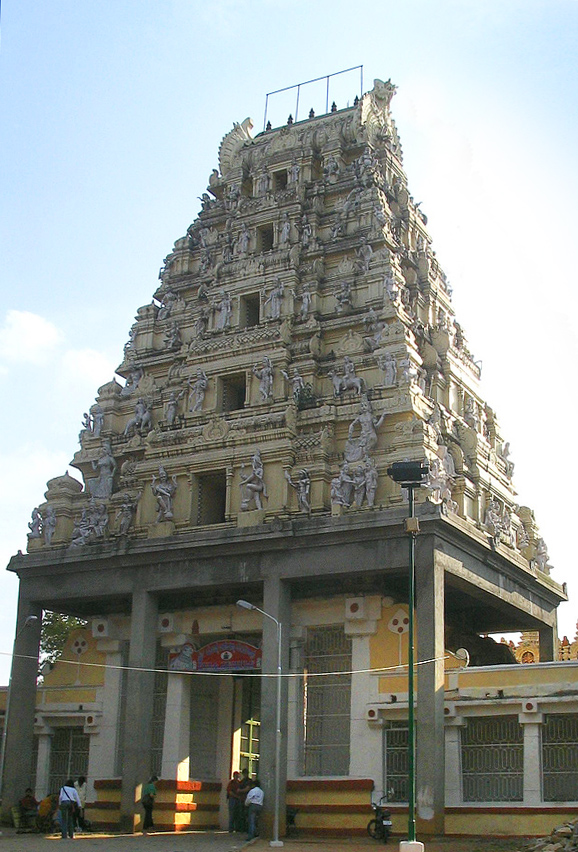
- Bull Temple, Basavanagudi

- Location within Bengaluru
- Coordinates: 12.94°N 77.57°E
- Country: India
- State: Karnataka
- Metro: Bengaluru

Population (Census 2011)
  - Total: 32,640
- Time zone: UTC+5:30 (IST)
- PIN: 560004,560019,560028,560050

Basavanagudi is a charming residential and commercial locality in the Indian city of Bengaluru. Basavanagudi is one of the oldest and poshest localities of Bangalore evidenced by the fact that it is home to four inscriptions, three Kannada and one Tamil. It is located in South Bangalore, along the borders of Jayanagar and Lalbagh Botanical Gardens. The name "Basavanagudi" refers to the Bull Temple, which contains a monolithic statue of the Nandi Bull. The word Basava in Kannada means bull, and gudi means temple. The main commercial street in Basavanagudi is DVG Road, which is home to numerous retail businesses - several of them dating back to the 1920s and 1930s. Towards the middle of DVG Road is Gandhi Bazaar, known for its market which sells fresh flowers, fruits, and vegetables. The neighbourhood includes several historic restaurants, notably Vidyarthi Bhavan, a vegetarian restaurant which opened in 1943. Basavanagudi is also home to B.M.S. College of Engineering, established in 1946, which holds the distinction of being the first private engineering college in India.

== Parks ==
- M. N. Krishna Rao Park
- Bugle Rock
- T. R. Shamanna Park
- Armugam Circle Park
- Dewan Madhav Rao Circle Park
- Ramakrishna Square
- Home School Circle
- Tagore Circle
- Nettakallappa Circle

== Events ==
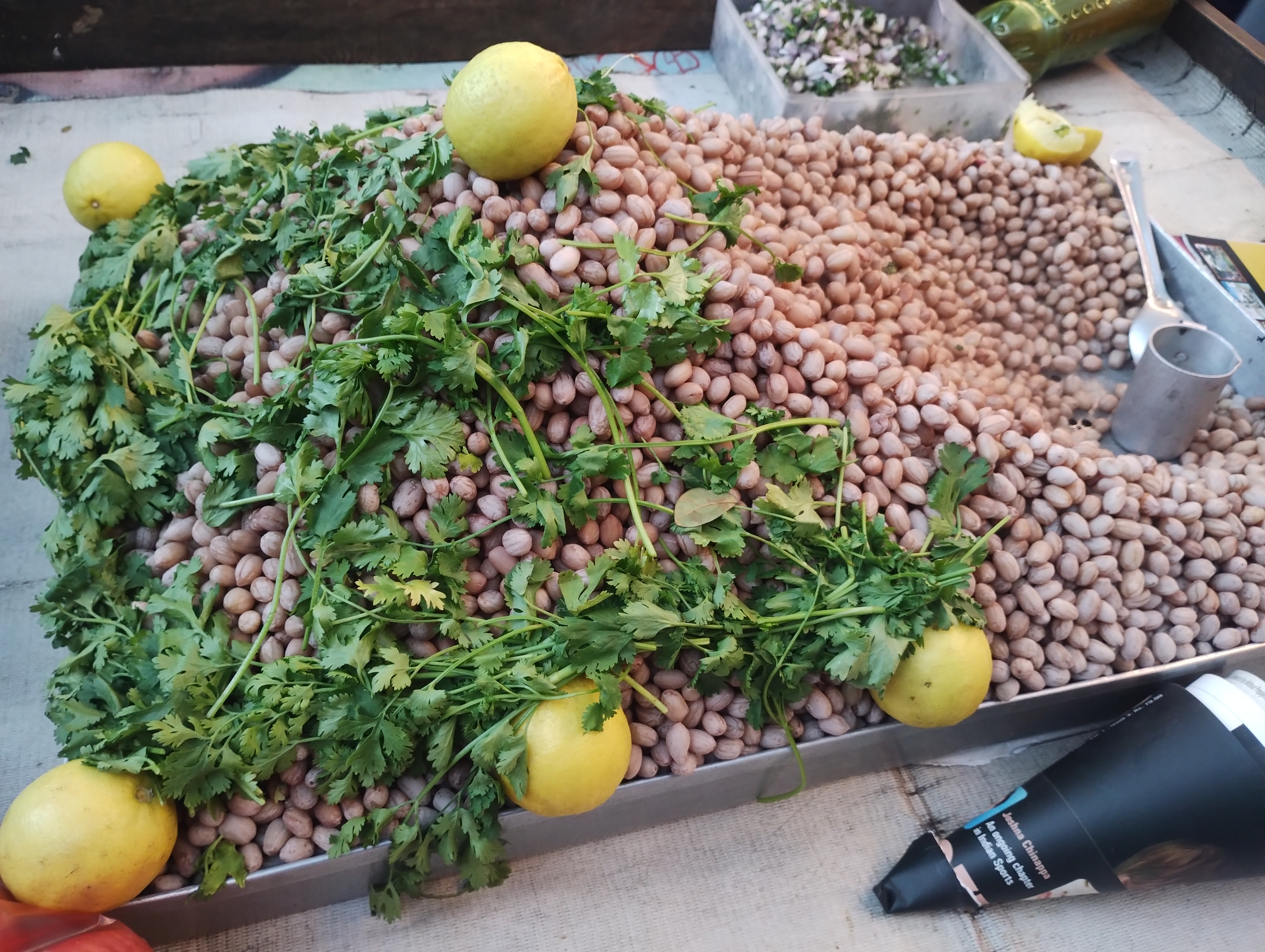
Basavanagudi Kadalekai Parishe, 2025

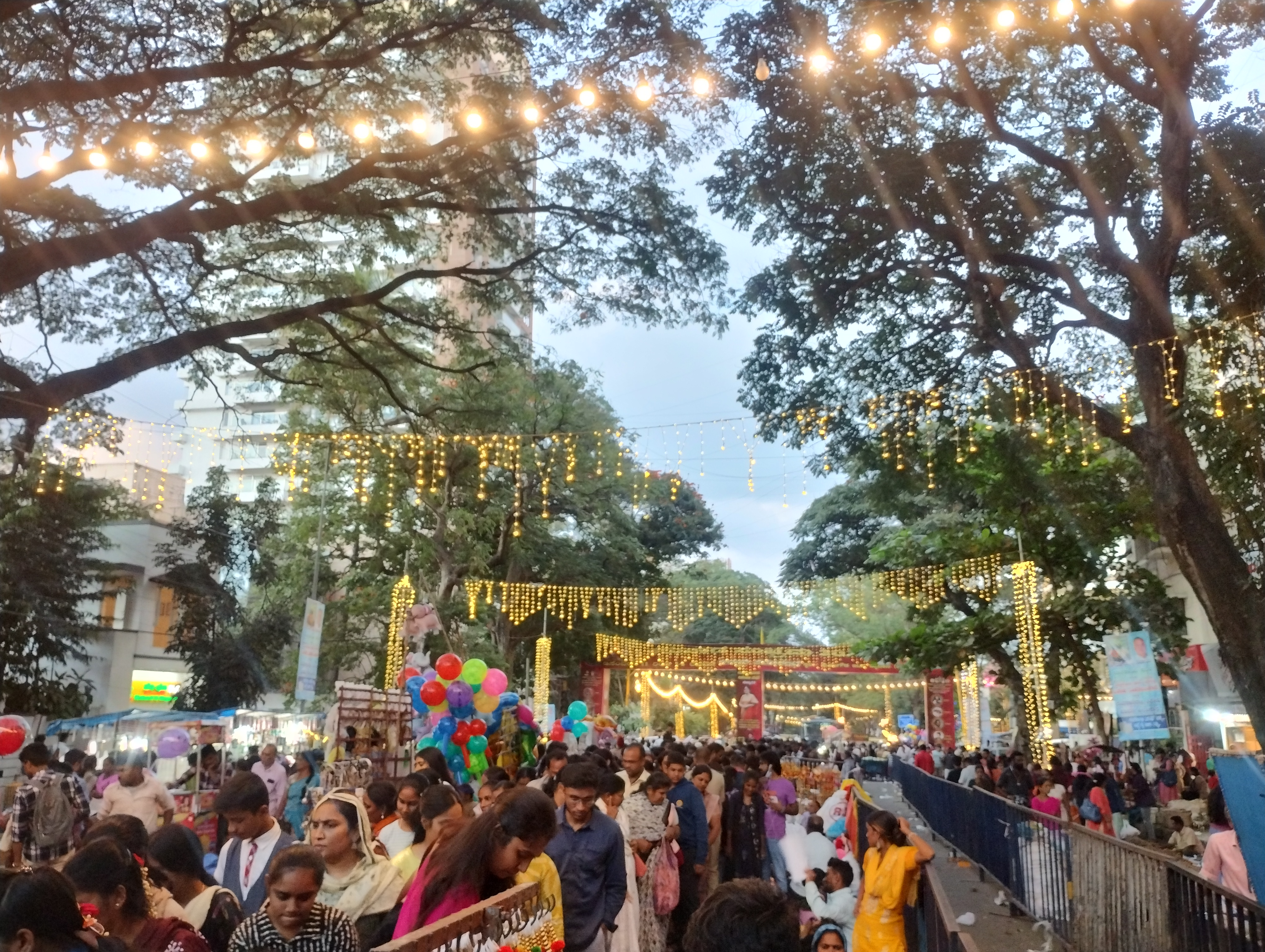
Basavanagudi Kadalekai Parishe, 2025

- Kadlekai Parishe: Every year a two-day fair of peanuts is held near Dodda Ganeshana Gudi of Basavanagudi called Kadlekai Parishe, which translates to Groundnut Fair. Groundnuts are exhibited and sold during this event.
- Bengaluru Ganesh Utsava: An annual event is held on the grounds of Acharya Pathasala Public School or National College, Bengaluru celebrating Ganesh Chaturthi festival for over 10 days. The evenings are studded with cultural programmes by artists from all over India.

== Education ==
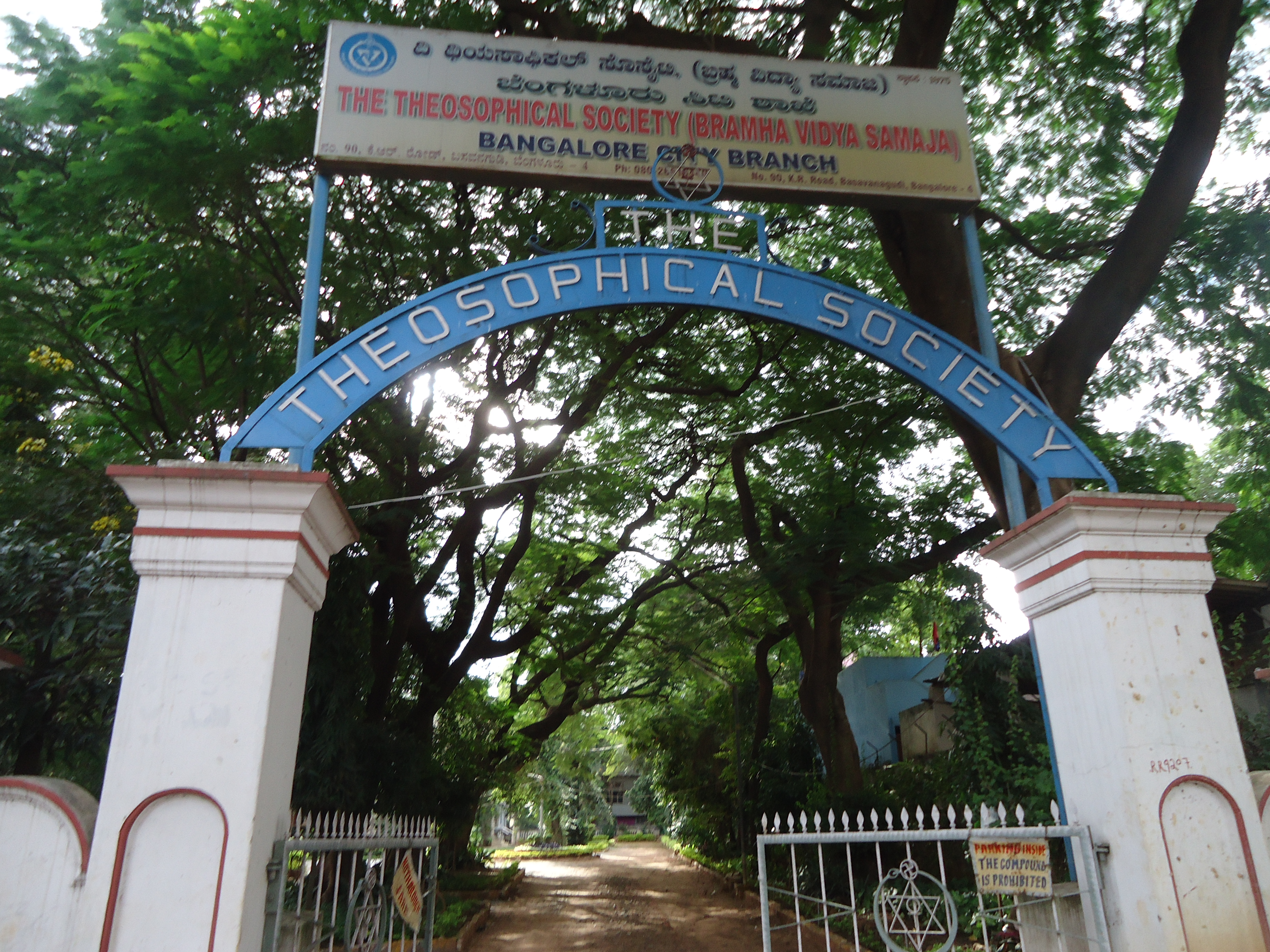
Theosophical Society, Basavanagudi

- The Indian Institute of World Culture, B P Wadia Road
- Gokhale Institute of Public Affairs
- B.M.S. College of Engineering
- National College, Basavanagudi
- Acharya Pathasala Public School
- National High School, KR Road, Basavanagudi
- Vijaya College, R.V. Road, Basavanagudi
- Mahila Seva Samaj, KR Road
- Sree Saraswathi Vidhya Mandir
- The Kenmore English School
- New Generation School
- Crescent School, Basavanagudi
- Bangalore High School
- Mahila Mandali Vidya Samsthe

== Temples and religious places ==
- Dodda Ganeshana Gudi
- Ramakrishna Ashram/Math
- Sri Mallikarjuna Swamy Temple
- Kaaranji Anjaneya Swamy Temple
- Uttaradhi Mutt
- Sringeri Shankarmutt
- Hanumanthana gudda (Ramanjaneya Gudda Temple)
- Poornapragna Vidyapeetha
- Magadi Karnikara Patha Shaale
- Sri Vyasaraja Mutt Sosale
- Raghavendra Swamy Brindavana
- Puthige Mutt
- Jamia Masjid Mohammedan Block
- Renukamba Temple, MN Krishna Rao Park
- Ayyappa Swamy Temple
- Jayatheertha Brindavana Sanidhana, PMK Road, Basavanagudi
- Christ Church, Church Road

== Notable residents ==
- D. V. Gundappa — Kannada poet and writer; after whom the DVG Road is named
- Mysore Suryanarayana Bhatta Puttanna — Author of Kannada literature
- Anil Kumble — Former Indian cricketer and cricket coach
- Hosur Narasimhaiah — Physicist, educator and activist
- K. S. Nissar Ahmed — Kannada poet and writer
- Masti Venkatesha Iyengar — Kannada poet and writer
- P. Lankesh — Kannada Journalist
- Ananth Kumar — Indian political leader
- Srinath — Kannada actor
- Navaratna Rama Rao - Political leader, writer and administrator
