= Rice Bazaar =

Wholesale market for rice in Kerala, India

Rice Bazaar is a wholesale market for different kinds of rice, located in the heart of City of Thrissur in Kerala state of India. The market traces its origins around 200 years ago.
