= Chaura Bazaar =

Market in Ludhiana, Punjab, India

Chaura Bazaar, Ludhiana is the main and old market of the city. It is like a commercial hub of the Ludhiana.

== History ==
Chaura Bazaar is an old market of 19th century. Some old building are still located in the streets of Chaura Bazaar. It was established on the bank of Sutlej River at Ludhiana. "Chaura Bazaar" literally means 'Wide Market'. Earlier days, market's streets were looking wide. So from this wide open streets its name become Chaura Bazaar. But according to in 21st century population streets are very narrow. It is difficult to take pass at daytime, and still people throng it. Every Sunday is a special and most busy day, just like Boxing Day. Monday mostly market go for off. There is a saying in Ludhiana that if a thing is not available anywhere it can be had from Chaura Bazaar only. The old Ludhiana city was confined to Chaura Bazaar, Daresi, Purana Bazaar and Ghas Mandi. Earlier people used to sell grass from Ghas Mandi. Today it may slightly look out of place, but the grass was an important commodity at that time since most of the transportation was done through horse driven carts and the horses were fed with grass only.

== See also ==
- Bazaar
- Beltola
- Hawker centre (Asia) a centre where street food is sold
- Haat bazaar
- Peddler
- Retail
- Street vendor
- Street food
