= Rythu bazaar =

Farmers' market initiative by the government of Andhra Pradesh, India

Rythu Bazaar
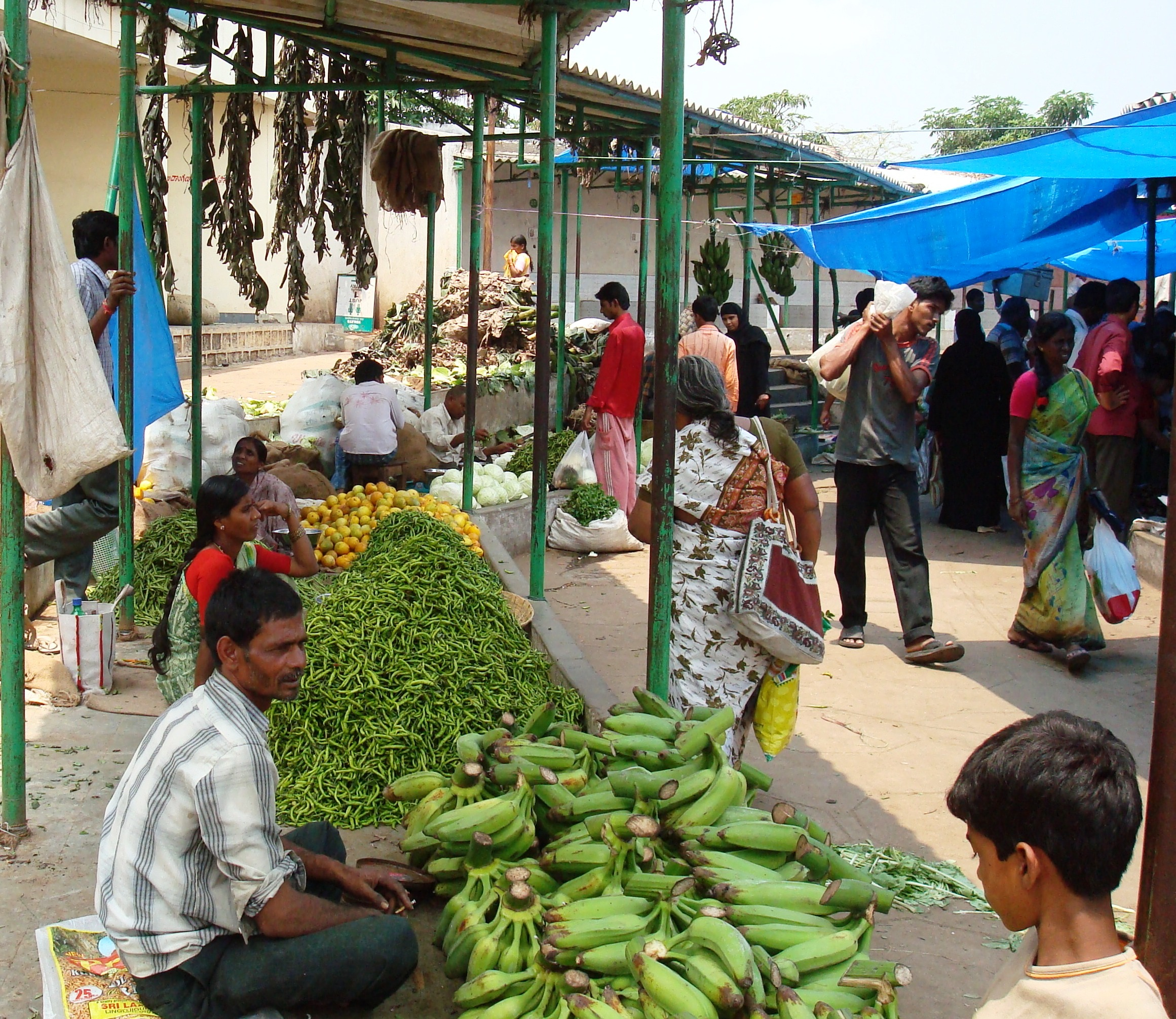
- Rythu Bazaar at Erragadda, Hyderabad
- Company type: Government-owned Market
- Founded: 26 January 1999 (27 years ago)
- Founder: N. Chandrababu Naidu
- Area served: Andhra Pradesh; Telangana
- Website: Official website

Rythu Bazaar is a government operated farmers' market in the Indian states of Andhra Pradesh and Telangana run by the Government of Andhra Pradesh and Government of Telangana respectively. It provides small and marginal farmers to sell their agricultural produce, primarily fresh vegetables, fruits, flowers and other perishables directly to consumers, eliminating traditional middlemen and intermediaries. This provides remunerative prices to farmers and offers fresh produce at reasonable rates to consumers. The initiative was launched by Chief Minister N. Chandrababu Naidu on 26 January 1999 in the undivided Andhra Pradesh.

== Operations ==
The markets ideally operate on a minimum one acre of vacant land with government provided infrastructure, including sheds, drinking water supply, toilet, sanitation facilities, vehicle parking, daily cleaning by local bodies and storage for unsold produce, weighing scales for all farmers funded by the National Bank for Agriculture and Rural Development, Rural Infrastructure Development Fund and National Cooperative Development Corporation. The government regulates the prices through daily fixation by committees, issuing identification cards to the farmers and horticulturists guiding on crop selection and quantities. In December 2025, the government of Andhra Pradesh launched the Digi Rythu Bazaar initiative to extend the services to the doorstep of the consumers directly from farmers through online ordering.

== See also ==
- Arabber
- Bazaar
- Bazaari
- Hawker centre (Asia), a centre where stree food is sold
- Haat bazaar
- Peddler
- Retail
- Street vendor
- Street food
