= Acharya Pathasala Public School =

School in India

- Motto in English: Awake Arise! Stop not till the goal is reached
- Type: Public School
- Established: 1989
- Affiliations: ICSE
- Academic staff: 100+
- Students: 1400+
- Location: Bangalore, Karnataka, India; 12.940110°N 77.567938°E
- Website: http://apspublic.com

Acharya Pathasala (transl. Teacher School) is an organization in southern Bangalore, Karnataka, India. It was founded in 1935 by Prof. N Ananthachar.

Acharya Pathasala Public School, started in 1989, is a co-educational English medium school, headed by Sri T. V. Maruthi, President of the Board of Management and Dr. A.S. Vishnu Bharath, Chartered Accountant as Chairman of Governing Council. The School is affiliated to the Council for the Indian School Certificate Examination (ICSE).

The school has had 100% results for X Standard in Board Exams over many years. It offers courses from upper kindergarten to X std.

The school has been placed as one of the top ICSE schools in bangalore

== Infrastructure ==
Facilities include labs and a library. A bus facility to and from school is available to children of all classes.

== Academics ==
Every batch that has graduated since 2000 has achieved cent percent result in the X std. examinations. Along with tests and examinations, the learning experience is based on projects, assignments, seminars and field trips. The pupil–teacher ratio of the school is 25:1.

== Activities ==
Children take part in activities like gardening, swimming, art, music, dance and theatre. Newspapers conduct their NIE programs aimed at developing the child's interest in newspapers and current affairs. A three-year program called "Theatre in Education" is conducted for the children to develop their skills in drama and theatre.

Events like exhibitions, inter high school Competitions (Blossoms, inter class competitions, Annual Day and Sports Day) are held to showcase the talents of the children. The Student Council takes a part in organizing events.

== Notable alumni ==
- Rajinikanth, actor
