= Urdu Bazaar =

- Urban open space
- Location in Delhi, India
- Coordinates: 28.649746°N 77.233472°E
- Country: India
- State: Delhi
- District: Central Delhi

Languages
  - Official: Hindi
- Time zone: UTC+5:30 (IST)

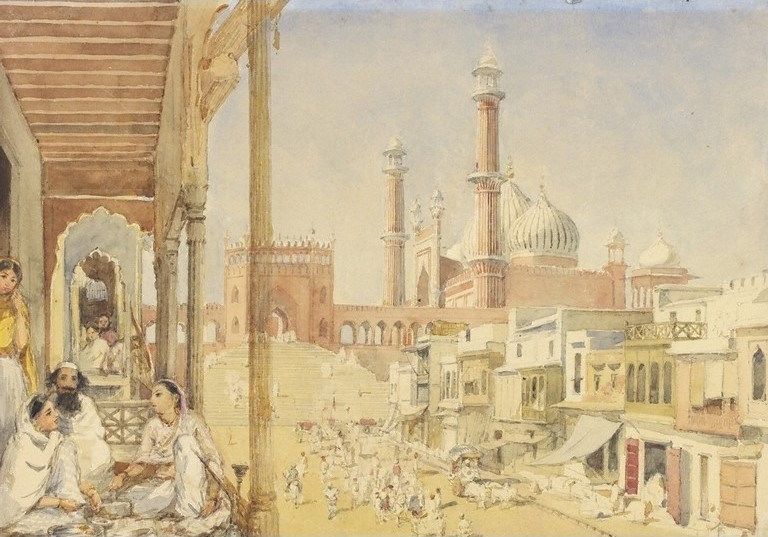
Jama Masjid, Delhi, 1852, seen from Urdu Bazaar.

The Urdu Bazaar (literally, 'camp market') was a major market in the walled city of Delhi, India, near the Chandni Chowk. The open grounds between the Jama Masjid and Red Fort were used for camping by the Mughal soldiery as well as an ammunition market. The original market was destroyed in the aftermath of the Indian Rebellion of 1857 along with the Mughal soldiery ceased to exist, but its name survives as a location near the Jama Masjid.

The Urdu language obtained its name from this market. Ghalib, who witnessed the Rebellion of 1857 lamented on the fall of Delhi in the aftermath of the failure of the 1857 rebellion: "My dear man, when Urdu Bazaar is no more, where is Urdu? By God, Delhi is no more a city, but a camp, a cantonment. No Fort, no city, no bazaars, ..."

Today, the main book publishing, printing and selling markets of the Pakistani cities such as Lahore, Karachi, Rawalpindi are also known as Urdu Bazaar.

== See also ==
- Arabber
- Bazaar
- Bazaari
- Haat bazaar
- Hawker centre (Asia) a centre where street food is sold
- Market (place)
- Peddler
- Retail
- Street vendor
- Street food
