= Lohar Chawl =

Lohar Chawl is a commercial locality of Mumbai, India. Lohar means iron smith in Marathi.

According to Fodor's Essential India, it is a popular market with a wide range of goods for sale. The locality is highly crowded with numerous wholesale outlets. It is also Mumbai's largest wholesale market for electrical goods.

== In popular culture ==
Miram Batliwala in her InSight — One Woman’s Incredible Journey from Darkness to Light reminisces about her numerous visits to Lohar Chawl's wholesale stores for "lighting fixtures, door handles and locks". One of Nalini Malini's work's is titled Alleyway, Lohar Chawl.
