= Jogulamba Barrage =

- Jogulamba Barrage at Veltoor Jogulamba Barrage (India)
- Official name: Jogulamba Barrage
- Country: India
- Location: Peddamandadi mandal of Wanaparthy district
- Coordinates: 15°57′49″N 78°8′47″E
- Purpose: Irrigation
- Status: Proposed
- Construction cost: Proposed
- Owner: Government of Telangana
- Operator: Government of Telangana

Dam and spillways
- Type of dam: Barrage
- Impounds: Krishna River
- Height: 274 meters
- Length: 3.82 kilometers
- Elevation at crest: 256 meters

Reservoir
- Creates: Jogulamba Reservoir
- Total capacity: 55.3 TMC
- Surface area: 161,766 Sq. Km

Jogulamba Barrage is a proposed barrage across Krishna River with full pond level (FPL) 274m. It would be located at Veltoor village, Peddamandadi mandal, Wanaparthy district, Telangana, India. This barrage is proposed to divert 3 TMC of water via lift to Yedula Reservoir being built as part of Palamuru-Rangareddy Lift Irrigation Scheme. This would also provide water for Dindi Lift Irrigation Project and Mahatma Gandhi Kalwakurthy Lift Irrigation Scheme.

== History ==
Pre-2014, the erstwhile state of Andhra Pradesh was the lower-most riparian state in Krishna basin and Krishna Water Disputes Tribunal had allocated the state, water to the tune of 800 TMC. The surplus/flood water allocation was expected to the tune of 80+ TMC.

On 2 June 2014, the erstwhile state of Andhra Pradesh, was bifurcated into the states of Telangana and Andhra Pradesh with Andhra Pradesh Reorganisation Act, 2014 coming into force. The Act also extended the term of existing tribunal (Krishna Water Disputes Tribunal - II) to distribute water between the two basin states. Given bifurcation, Krishna River basin between the states bifurcated too. Telangana became an upper riparian state and Andhra Pradesh a lower riparian state. A temporary arrangement of water between Andhra Pradesh and Telangana in Krishna basin was agreed to, until extended tribunal distributes water. The arrangement shared 811 TMC of water as - 298.96 TMC for Telangana and 512.04 TMC for Andhra Pradesh.

On completion of the Polavaram Project (Left Main Canal) and Pattiseema Lift Irrigation Project, the ayacut of Prakasam Barrage would receive Godavari water and would no longer be dependent on Nagarjuna Sagar Dam and Pulichinthala Project. As such 80 TMC of water for Prakasam Barrage needed would need to be redistributed between upper riparian states, as such share of Telangana would increase.

In 2020, the Government of Andhra Pradesh has under taken construction works for Rayalaseema Lift Irrigation Project, to divert 8 TMC of water per day from Srisailam Dam via lift by modernising existing canals of Telugu Ganga Project (inter-basin transfer to Penna basin i.e. Somasila Dam and Kandaleru Dam; there after to Poondi reservoir in Tamil Nadu provide 15 TMC of drinking water to the city of Chennai) and Srisailam Right Bank Canal (inter-basin transfer to Penna basin via Galeru Nagari Sujala Sravanthi Project). The existing canals already draw 4 TMC of water per day from Srisailam Dam. As of June 2021, this project has no approvals from all the concerned authorities including Central Water Commission, Ministry of Environment, Forest and Climate Change etc.

In 2021, the Government of Andhra Pradesh also started construction works for 160 km Right Canal of Rajolibanda Diversion Scheme to divert 5 TMC of water from Tungabhadra River, which is a tributary of Krishna river. This would impact water withdrawal via Left Canal, which flows in Karnataka and Telangana regions and has an assured water allocation of 15 TMC. As of June 2021, this project has no approvals from all the concerned authorities including Central Water Commission, Ministry of Environment, Forest and Climate Change etc.

Given these developments in Krishna Basin, on June 19, 2021, in a Cabinet Meeting of Government of Telangana, cabinet expressed that these two illegal projects would hamper interests of water projects in Telangana. As of 2021, Telangana has so far not utilized more than 150 TMC from its assured ~300 TMC of water.

As such, the same day, cabinet approved construction of Jogulamba Barrage with storage of 55.3 TMC in Wanaparthy district to divert water via lift to the tune of 3 TMC for the on-going Palamuru-Ranga Reddy Lift Irrigation Project, Dindi Lift Irrigation Project and Mahatma Gandhi Kalwakurthy Lift Irrigation Scheme. Srisailam backwaters would touch the foot of the proposed barrage and its backwaters would extend until near Lower Jurala Hydro Electric Project.

A Government Order was issued on June 24, 2021 by Government of Telangana, for survey of the proposed barrage to prepare detailed project report.
