= Kollapur Assembly constituency =

Constituency of the Telangana legislative assembly in India

Coordinates: 16.11°N 78.31°E

Kollapur
- Constituency No. 85 for the Telangana Legislative Assembly
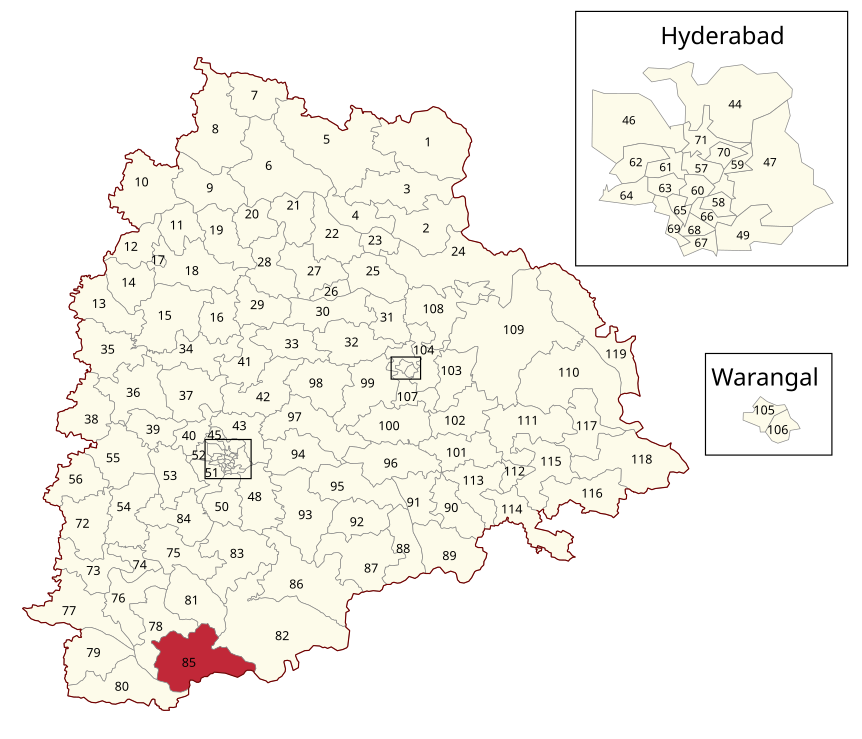
- Location of Kollapur Assembly constituency within Telangana

Constituency details
- Country: India
- Region: South India
- State: Telangana
- District: Nagarkurnool
- Lok Sabha constituency: Nagarkurnool
- Established: 1951
- Total electors: 205,019
- Reservation: None

Member of Legislative Assembly
- 3rd Telangana Legislative Assembly
- Incumbent Jupally Krishna Rao
- Party: Indian National Congress
- Elected year: 2023

Kollapur Assembly constituency is a constituency of the Telangana Legislative Assembly, India. It is one of the four constituencies in Nagarkurnool district. It is part of Nagarkurnool Lok Sabha constituency.

Jupally Krishna Rao, who won the assembly elections held in December 2023, is currently representing the constituency.

== Mandals ==
The assembly constituency presently comprises the following mandals:

Mandal	District
Kollapuram	Nagarkurnool
Veepangandla	Wanaparthy
Kodair	Nagarkurnool
Pangal	Wanaparthy
Peddakothapalle	Nagarkurnool
Chinnambavi	Wanaparthy
Pentlavelli	Nagarkurnool

== Members of the Legislative Assembly ==
Year	Member	Political party
Hyderabad
1952	Anantha Ramachandra Rao	People's Democratic Front
United Andhra Pradesh
1957	M. Narsing Rao	Indian National Congress
1962	K. Ranga rao	Indian National Congress
1967	B. Narasimha Rao	Independent
1972	K. Ranga rao	Independent
1978	Venkateshwar Rao Kotha	Indian National Congress
1983	Venkateshwar Rao Kotha	Indian National Congress
1985	Venkateshwar Rao Kotha	Indian National Congress
1989	Ramchandra Rao	Indian National Congress
1994	Katikeneni Madhusudhan Rao	Telugu Desam Party
1999	Jupally Krishna Rao	Indian National Congress
2004	Jupally Krishna Rao	Indian National Congress
2009	Jupally Krishna Rao	Indian National Congress
2012★	Jupally Krishna Rao	Telangana Rashtra Samithi
2014	Jupally Krishna Rao	Telangana Rashtra Samithi
2018	Beeram Harshavardhan Reddy	Indian National Congress
2023	Jupally Krishna Rao	Indian National Congress

★by-election

== Election results ==
=== Telangana Legislative Assembly election, 2023 ===
Telangana Assembly Elections, 2023: Kollapur (Assembly constituency)
Party	Candidate	Votes	%	±%
INC	Jupally Krishna Rao	93,609	48.70	
BRS	Beeram Harshavardhan Reddy	63,678	33.13	
BJP	Aelleni Sudhakar Rao	20,389	10.61	
Independent	Karne Shireesha (Barrelakka)	9,754	5.05	
BSP	Gaganam Shekaraiah	2,623	1.36	
Majority		29,931	15.57	
Turnout		1,92,228		
INC gain from BRS		Swing		

=== Telangana Legislative Assembly election, 2018 ===
Telangana Assembly Elections, 2018: Kolapur (Assembly constituency)
Party	Candidate	Votes	%	±%
INC	Beeram Harshavardhan Reddy	80,617	46.36	
TRS	Jupally Krishna Rao	68,071	39.15	
BJP	Aelleni Sudhakar Rao	13,156	7.57	
NOTA	None of the Above	1,182	0.68	
Majority		12,546	7.21	
Turnout		1,73,887	83.17	
INC gain from TRS		Swing		

=== Telangana Legislative Assembly election, 2014 ===
Telangana Assembly Elections, 2014: Kolapur (Assembly constituency)
Party	Candidate	Votes	%	±%
TRS	Jupally Krishna Rao	72,741	46.86	
INC	Beeram Harshavardhan Reddy	62,243	40.10	
BJP	Katikaneni Madhusudan Rao	5,358	3.45	
NOTA	None of the Above	767	0.49	
Majority		10,498	6.76	
Turnout		1,55,224	74.52	
TRS hold		Swing		

== See also ==
- List of constituencies of Telangana Legislative Assembly
