= Palamuru-Rangareddy Lift Irrigation Scheme =

Palamuru-Rangareddy Lift Irrigation Project
- Location within India Location within Telangana
- Location: Telangana, India
- Coordinates: 15°57′49″N 78°8′47″E
- Purpose: Irrigation, power, and transport
- Status: Completed/Inaugurated
- Construction began: 2015
- Opening date: 16 September 2023; 3 years ago
- Construction cost: ₹ 35,000 crores
- Owner: Telangana Irrigation Department
- Operator: Telangana Irrigation Department

Dam and spillways
- Impounds: Krishna River
- Height: up to top of earth dam above the lowest river bed.
- Spillway type: Chute spillway

Reservoir
- Total capacity: 67.52 TMCFT

The Palamuru-Rangareddy Lift Irrigation Project (PRLIP) is an irrigation project in the state of Telangana, India. The project aims to make 12.3 lakh acres of parched lands in erstwhile combined Mahabubnagar district into fertile lands. The project is to be built on the Krishna river at a cost of ₹ 35,000 crore in Nagarkurnool district. On 16 September 2023, Telangana Chief Minister K. Chandrashekar Rao operationalised the first phase of Palamuru-Rangareddy Lift Irrigation Scheme at Yellur-Narlapur pump house in Nagarkurnool district. The project will change the future of six districts viz, Nagarkurnool, Mahabubnagar, Nalgonda, Wanaparthy, Rangareddy, Vikarabad in South Telangana.

== History ==
Chief Minister Kalvakuntla Chandrashekhar Rao laid the foundation stone of irrigation project on 11 June 2015. The project aims to divert 70 TMC of flood water from Krishna River at Jurala project.

== See also ==
- Kaleshwaram Lift Irrigation Project
- R. Vidyasagar Rao Dindi Lift Irrigation Scheme
- Mahatma Gandhi Kalwakurthy lift irrigation scheme
