= Beeram Harshavardhan Reddy =

Indian politician (born 1978)

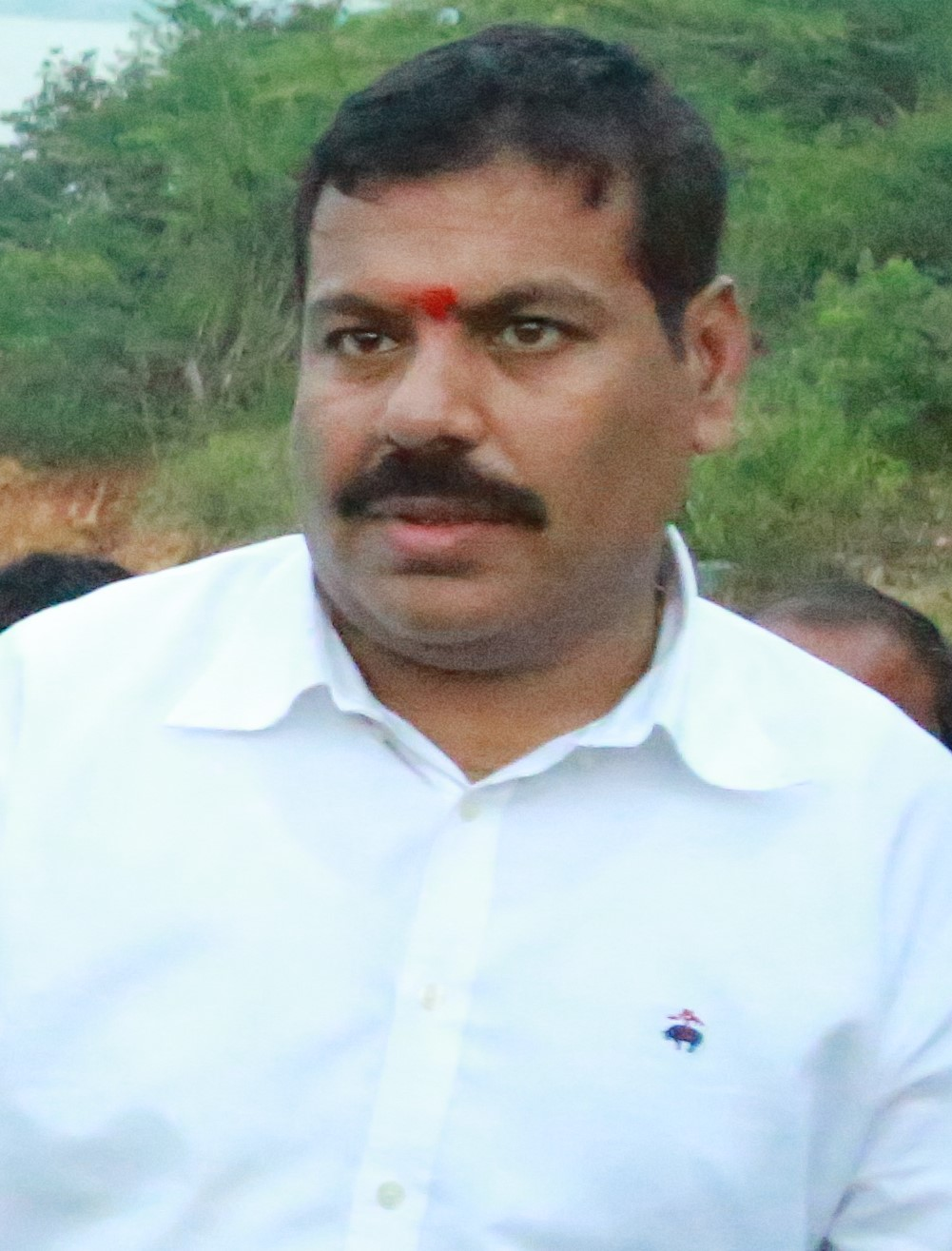

Member of the Telangana Legislative Assembly
- In office 2018 - 2023
- Preceded by: Jupally Krishna Rao
- Succeeded by: Jupally Krishna Rao
- Constituency: Kollapur

Personal details
- Born: 31 August 1978 (age 48) Singotam, Kollapur, Nagarkurnool district, Telangana
- Party: Bharat Rashtra Samithi
- Other political affiliations: TDP; YSRCP; INC
- Spouse: Vijaya
- Parent(s): Beeram Lakshma Reddy, Buchamma

Beeram Harshavardhan Reddy (born 31 August 1978) is an Indian politician and Ex legislator of Telangana Legislative Assembly. He won as MLA from Kollapur in 2018 Telangana Elections

== Early life ==
Harshavardhan Reddy was born on 31 August 1978 to Lakshma Reddy, Buchamma. He has completed his LLB from PRR Law College, Osmania University in 2001 and worked as an Advocate for 10 years.

== Political career ==
Harshavardhan Reddy started his political journey with Telugu Desam Party(TDP) and later in YSRCP party for some days. He joined the Congress party in 2014. He contested 2014 Telangana Assembly elections from Congress and lost to TRS Candidate Jupally Krishna Rao. Beeram Harshavardhan Reddy won 2018 Elections from Kollapur Assembly seat on Congress ticket later joined Telangana Rashtra Samithi in 2020.

== Electoral history ==
Election Year	Office for	Constituency	Party Affiliation	Result	Nearest Rival & Party	
2014	MLA	Kollapur	Indian National Congress	Lost	Jupally Krishna Rao	Telangana Rashtra Samithi
2018	MLA	Kollapur	Indian National Congress	Won	Jupally Krishna Rao	Telangana Rashtra Samithi
2023	MLA	Kollapur	Bharat Rashtra Samithi	Lost	Jupally Krishna Rao	Indian National Congress
