= Jupally Krishna Rao =

Indian politician

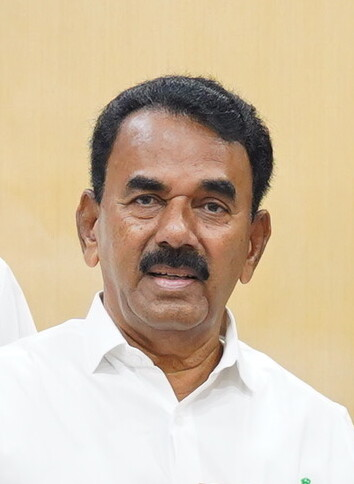

Minister of Prohibition & Excise, Tourism & Culture and Archaeology Government of Telangana
- Incumbent
- Assumed office 07 December 2023
- Governor: Tamilisai Soundararajan (2023-2024); C.P. Radhakrishnan (Additional charge) (2024); Jishnu Dev Varma (2024-2026); Shiv Pratap Shukla ( 2026–present)
- Chief Minister: Revanth Reddy
- Preceded by: V. Srinivas Goud

Minister of Industries, Handlooms & Textiles, Sugar Government of Telangana
- In office 2 June 2014–12 December 2018
- Governor: E. S. L. Narasimhan
- Chief Minister: K. Chandrashekar Rao
- Preceded by: Office Established
- Succeeded by: K. T. Rama Rao

Member of Telangana Legislative Assembly
- Incumbent
- Assumed office 11 December 2023
- Preceded by: Bhiram Harshvardhan Reddy
- Constituency: Kollapur
- In office 2 June 2014 – 11 December 2018
- Preceded by: Telangana Assembly Created
- Succeeded by: Bhiram Harshvardhan Reddy
- Constituency: Kollapur

Minister of Endowments Government of Andhra Pradesh
- In office 25 May 2009 - 1 June 2011
- Governor: N. D. Tiwari; E. S. L. Narasimhan
- Chief Minister: Y. S. Rajasekhara Reddy; Konijeti Rosaiah
- Preceded by: J. Ratnakar Rao
- Succeeded by: C. Ramachandraiah

Member of Legislative Assembly Andhra Pradesh
- In office 15 June 2012 – 21 February 2014
- Preceded by: Himself (Resigned for Telangana Statehood)
- Succeeded by: Telangana Assembly Created
- Constituency: Kollapur
- In office 11 October 1999 – 15 May 2012
- Preceded by: Katikeneni Madhusudhan Rao
- Succeeded by: Himself (Resigned for Telangana Statehood)
- Constituency: Kollapur

Personal details
- Born: 10 August 1955 (age 71) Kollapur, Telangana, India
- Party: Indian National Congress (1999-2011) (2023-present)
- Other political affiliations: Bharat Rashtra Samithi (2011-2023)
- Spouse: Sujana
- Children: Varun, Arun

Jupally Krishna Rao (born 10 August 1955) is an Indian politician and was Minister of Telangana. He was elected as MLA in the Telangana Legislative Assembly from Kollapur and won elections 5 times. He lost in 2018 assembly elections.

== Career ==
He quit Congress Party and joined Telangana Rashtra Samithi on 30 October 2011.

He lost in 2018 Assembly Elections. He took oath as minister at L B Stadium in Hyderabad on 7 December 2023 and later he was assigned as Minister for Prohibition and Excise, Tourism and Culture portfolios on 9 December 2023 in Revanth Reddy Ministry.

== Electoral History ==
=== Legislative Assembly Elections ===
Year	Constituency	Party	Votes	%	Opponent	Party	Votes	%	Result	Margin	%
2023	Kollapur	INC	93,609	48.70	B. Harshavardhan Reddy	BRS	63,678	33.13	Won	+29,931	+15.57
2018	Kollapur	TRS	68,071	39.15	B. Harshavardhan Reddy	INC	80,617	46.36	Lost	-12,546	-7.21
2014	Kollapur	TRS	72,741	46.86	B. Harshavardhan Reddy	INC	62,243	40.10	Won	+10,498	+6.76
2012	Kollapur	TRS	58,107	38.47	M. Vishnuvardhan Reddy	INC	43,083	28.53	Won	+15,024	+9.94
2009	Kollapur	INC	58,046	38.44	C. Jagadeeswar Rao	TDP	56,538	37.44	Won	+1,508	+1.00
2004	Kollapur	IND	49,369	43.50	K. Madhusudan Rao	TDP	46,329	40.83	Won	+3,040	+2.67
1999	Kollapur	INC	54,677	49.32	K. Madhusudan Rao	TDP	49,372	44.54	Won	+5,305	+4.78
