= April 29 =

April 29 this year in various calendars
- Wednesday, 29 April 2026
Akan	Fowukuo
Armenian	13 Mareri 1475
Aztec	Xocotlhuetzi 9, 6 Ōlīn
Babylonian	11 Nisanu, 2337 SE
Balinese pawukon	Menga, Pasah, Sri, Umanis, Tungleh, Buda of Kulantir, Sri, Nohan, Suka
Bengali	16 Boisakh, BS 1433
Chinese	Yin Water Rooster・Chariot Mansion; Fire Horse Year, Month 3, Day 13 (Guyu, 6 days until Lixia)
Common Era	29 April 2026 CE
Coptic	21 Parmouti, AM 1742
Egyptian	13 Thoth, 2775 NE
Ethiopian	21 Miyāzyā, 2018 Amätä Məhrät
French Republican	Décade I, Décadi de Floréal de l'Année 234 de la République
Gregorian	29 April, AD 2026
Hebrew	12 Iyar, AM 5786; Omer 27
Hindu	Hasta・Harṣaṇa; Solar: 16 Vaiśākha, 1948 SE; Lunisolar: Trayodaśī, Śukla pakṣa of Vaiśākha, 2083 VE; Rāudra・5127 KY・1,872,694
Icelandic	Miðvikudagur, 7 Harpa 2026
Islamic	12 Dhu al-Qi'dah, AH 1447 (using tabular method)
ISO week date	2026-W18-3
Japanese	13 Yayoi, Reiwa 8 (Kokuu, 6 days until Rikka)
Julian	16 April, AD 2026 (AM 7534)
Julian day	2461160
Korean	13 Yongdal, 4359 DE
Maya	13.0.13.9.17; 10 Uo, 6 Caban
Roman	ante diem XVI Kalendas Maias, MMDCCLXXIX AUC
Solar Hijri	9 Ordibehesht, SH 1405
Tibetan	13 nag pa, me pho rta 2153 or 1772 or 1000

<<	April					>>
Su	Mo	Tu	We	Th	Fr	Sa
			1	2	3	4
5	6	7	8	9	10	11
12	13	14	15	16	17	18
19	20	21	22	23	24	25
26	27	28	29	30
2026

April 29 in recent years
2026 (Wednesday)
2025 (Tuesday)
2024 (Monday)
2023 (Saturday)
2022 (Friday)
2021 (Thursday)
2020 (Wednesday)
2019 (Monday)
2018 (Sunday)
2017 (Saturday)

April 29 is the 119th day of the year (120th in leap years) in the Gregorian calendar; 246 days remain until the end of the year.

== Events ==
=== Pre-1600 ===
- 801 – An earthquake in the Central Apennines hits Rome and Spoleto, damaging the basilica of San Paolo Fuori le Mura.
- 1091 – Battle of Levounion: The Pechenegs are defeated by Byzantine Emperor Alexios I Komnenos.
- 1429 – Joan of Arc arrives to relieve the Siege of Orléans.
- 1483 – Gran Canaria, the main island of the Canary Islands, is conquered by the Kingdom of Castile.
- 1492 – The Crown's decision to expel the Jews is announced in Zaragoza, Aragon, to the kingdom's procurators.
- 1521 – Swedish War of Liberation: Swedish troops defeat a Danish force in the Battle of Västerås.

=== 1601–1900 ===
- 1670 – Emilio Altieri is elected pope after a four-month conclave and takes the name Clement X.
- 1760 – French forces commence the siege of Quebec which is held by the British.
- 1770 – James Cook arrives in Australia at Botany Bay, which he names.
- 1781 – American Revolutionary War: British and French ships clash in the Battle of Fort Royal off the coast of Martinique.
- 1826 – The galaxy Centaurus A or NGC 5128 is discovered by James Dunlop.
- 1861 – Maryland in the American Civil War: Maryland's House of Delegates votes not to secede from the Union.
- 1862 – American Civil War: The Capture of New Orleans by Union forces under David Farragut.
- 1862 – American Civil War: The Siege of Corinth begins as Union forces under General Henry Halleck move to engage Confederate forces led by General P. G. T. Beauregard.
- 1864 – Theta Xi fraternity is founded at Rensselaer Polytechnic Institute, the only fraternity to be founded during the American Civil War.

=== 1901–present ===
- 1903 – A landslide kills 70 people in Frank, in the District of Alberta, Canada.
- 1910 – The Parliament of the United Kingdom passes the People's Budget, the first budget in British history with the expressed intent of redistributing wealth among the British public.
- 1911 – Tsinghua University, one of mainland China's leading universities, is founded.
- 1916 – World War I: The UK's 6th Indian Division surrenders to Ottoman Forces at the Siege of Kut in one of the largest surrenders of British forces up to that point.
- 1916 – Easter Rising: After six days of fighting, Irish rebel leaders surrender to British forces in Dublin, bringing the Easter Rising to an end.
- 1945 – World War II: The Surrender of Caserta is signed by the commander of German forces in Italy.
- 1945 – World War II: Allied airdrops of food begin over German-occupied regions of the Netherlands.
- 1945 – World War II: Adolf Hitler marries his longtime partner Eva Braun in a Berlin bunker and designates Admiral Karl Dönitz as his successor.
- 1945 – Dachau concentration camp is liberated by United States troops.
- 1946 – The International Military Tribunal for the Far East convenes and indicts former Prime Minister of Japan Hideki Tojo and 28 former Japanese leaders for war crimes.
- 1952 – Pan Am Flight 202 crashes into the Amazon basin near Carolina, Maranhão, Brazil, killing 50 people.
- 1953 – The first U.S. experimental 3D television broadcast shows an episode of Space Patrol on Los Angeles ABC affiliate KECA-TV.
- 1967 – After refusing induction into the United States Army the previous day, Muhammad Ali is stripped of his boxing title.
- 1970 – Vietnam War: United States and South Vietnamese forces invade Cambodia to interdict the Ho Chi Minh Trail in an attempt to cut off supplies to the Viet Cong and the North Vietnamese Army.
- 1974 – Watergate scandal: United States President Richard Nixon announces the release of edited transcripts of White House tape recordings relating to the scandal.
- 1975 – Vietnam War: Operation Frequent Wind: The U.S. begins to evacuate U.S. citizens from Saigon before an expected North Vietnamese takeover. U.S. involvement in the war comes to an end. This happens after the Bombing of Tan Son Nhut Air Base.
- 1975 – Vietnam War: The North Vietnamese Army completes its capture of all parts of South Vietnam-held Trường Sa Islands.
- 1985 – Space Shuttle Challenger is launched on STS-51-B.
- 1986 – A fire at the Central library of the Los Angeles Public Library damages or destroys 400,000 books and other items.
- 1986 – The United States Navy aircraft carrier USS Enterprise becomes the first nuclear-powered aircraft carrier to transit the Suez Canal, navigating from the Red Sea to the Mediterranean Sea to relieve the USS Coral Sea.
- 1986 – An assembly of Sikhs, known as a Sarbat Khalsa, officially declare independence for a state of Khalistan.
- 1991 – A cyclone strikes the Chittagong district of southeastern Bangladesh with winds of around 155 miles per hour (249 km/h), killing at least 138,000 people and leaving as many as ten million homeless.
- 1991 – The 7.0 M_{w} Racha earthquake affects Georgia with a maximum MSK intensity of IX (Destructive), killing 270 people.
- 1992 – Riots in Los Angeles begin, following the acquittal of police officers charged with excessive force in the beating of Rodney King. Over the next three days 63 people are killed and hundreds of buildings are destroyed.
- 1997 – The Chemical Weapons Convention of 1993 enters into force, outlawing the production, stockpiling and use of chemical weapons by its signatories.
- 2004 – The final Oldsmobile is built in Lansing, Michigan, ending 107 years of vehicle production.
- 2011 – The wedding of Prince William and Catherine Middleton takes place at Westminster Abbey in London.
- 2013 – A powerful explosion occurs in an office building in Prague, believed to have been caused by natural gas, and injures 43 people.
- 2013 – National Airlines Flight 102, a Boeing 747-400 freighter aircraft, crashes during takeoff from Bagram Airfield in Parwan Province, Afghanistan, killing all seven people on board.
- 2015 – A baseball game between the Baltimore Orioles and the Chicago White Sox sets the all-time low attendance mark for Major League Baseball. Zero fans were in attendance for the game, as the stadium was officially closed to the public due to the 2015 Baltimore protests.

== Births ==
=== Pre-1600 ===
- 1469 – William II, Landgrave of Hesse (died 1509)
- 1587 – Sophie of Saxony, Duchess of Pomerania (died 1635)

=== 1601–1900 ===
- 1636 – Esaias Reusner, German lute player and composer (died 1679)
- 1665 – James Butler, 2nd Duke of Ormonde, Irish general and politician, Lord Lieutenant of Ireland (died 1745)
- 1667 – John Arbuthnot, Scottish-English physician and polymath (died 1735)
- 1727 – Jean-Georges Noverre, French actor and dancer (died 1810)
- 1745 – Oliver Ellsworth, American lawyer and politician, 3rd Chief Justice of the United States (died 1807)
- 1758 – Georg Carl von Döbeln, Swedish general (died 1820)
- 1762 – Jean-Baptiste Jourdan, French general and politician, French Minister of Foreign Affairs (died 1833)
- 1780 – Charles Nodier, French librarian and author (died 1844)
- 1783 – David Cox, English landscape painter (died 1859)
- 1784 – Samuel Turell Armstrong, American publisher and politician, 14th Lieutenant Governor of Massachusetts (died 1850)
- 1810 – Thomas Adolphus Trollope, English journalist and author (died 1892)
- 1818 – Alexander II of Russia (died 1881)
- 1837 – Georges Ernest Boulanger, French general and politician, French Minister of War (died 1891)
- 1842 – Carl Millöcker, Austrian composer and conductor (died 1899)
- 1847 – Joachim Andersen, Danish flautist, composer and conductor (died 1907)
- 1848 – Raja Ravi Varma, Indian painter and academic (died 1906)
- 1854 – Henri Poincaré, French mathematician, physicist and engineer (died 1912)
- 1863 – Constantine P. Cavafy, Egyptian-Greek journalist and poet (died 1933)
- 1863 – William Randolph Hearst, American publisher and politician, founded the Hearst Corporation (died 1951)
- 1863 – Maria Teresia Ledóchowska, Austrian nun and missionary (died 1922)
- 1872 – Harry Payne Whitney, American businessman and lawyer (died 1930)
- 1872 – Forest Ray Moulton, American astronomer and academic (died 1952)
- 1875 – Rafael Sabatini, Italian-English novelist and short story writer (died 1950)
- 1879 – Thomas Beecham, English conductor (died 1961)
- 1880 – Adolf Chybiński, Polish historian, musicologist and academic (died 1952)
- 1882 – Auguste Herbin, French painter (died 1960)
- 1882 – Hendrik Nicolaas Werkman, Dutch printer, typographer, and Nazi resister (died 1945)
- 1885 – Egon Erwin Kisch, Czech journalist and author (died 1948)
- 1887 – Robert Cushman Murphy, American ornithologist (died 1973)
- 1888 – Michael Heidelberger, American immunologist (died 1991)
- 1891 – Edward Wilfred Taylor, British businessman (died 1980)
- 1893 – Harold Urey, American chemist and astronomer, Nobel Prize laureate (died 1981)
- 1894 – Marietta Blau, Austrian physicist and academic (died 1970)
- 1895 – Vladimir Propp, Russian scholar and critic (died 1970)
- 1895 – Malcolm Sargent, English organist, composer and conductor (died 1967)
- 1898 – E. J. Bowen, British physical chemist (died 1980)
- 1899 – Duke Ellington, American pianist, composer and bandleader (died 1974)
- 1899 – Mary Petty, American illustrator (died 1976)
- 1900 – Amelia Best, Australian politician (died 1979)

=== 1901–present ===
- 1901 – Hirohito, Japanese emperor (died 1989)
- 1907 – Fred Zinnemann, Austrian-American director and producer (died 1997)
- 1908 – Jack Williamson, American author and academic (died 2006)
- 1909 – Tom Ewell, American actor (died 1994)
- 1912 – Richard Carlson, American actor, director, and screenwriter (died 1977)
- 1915 – Henry H. Barschall, German-American physicist and academic (died 1997)
- 1917 – Maya Deren, Ukrainian-American director, poet, and photographer (died 1961)
- 1917 – Celeste Holm, American actress and singer (died 2012)
- 1918 – George Allen, American football player and coach (died 1990)
- 1919 – Gérard Oury, French actor, director and screenwriter (died 2006)
- 1920 – Edward Blishen, English author and radio host (died 1996)
- 1920 – Harold Shapero, American composer (died 2013)
- 1922 – Parren Mitchell, American politician (died 2007)
- 1922 – Toots Thielemans, Belgian guitarist and harmonica player (died 2016)
- 1923 – Irvin Kershner, American actor, director and producer (died 2010)
- 1924 – Zizi Jeanmaire, French ballerina and actress (died 2020)
- 1925 – John Compton, Saint Lucian lawyer and politician, 1st Prime Minister of Saint Lucia (died 2007)
- 1925 – Iwao Takamoto, American animator, director, and producer (died 2007)
- 1926 – Elmer Kelton, American journalist and author (died 2009)
- 1927 – Dorothy Manley, English sprinter (died 2021)
- 1927 – Bill Slater, English footballer (died 2018)
- 1928 – Carl Gardner, American singer (died 2011)
- 1928 – Heinz Wolff, German-English physiologist, engineer, and academic (died 2017)
- 1929 – Walter Kempowski, German author and academic (died 2007)
- 1929 – Peter Sculthorpe, Australian composer and conductor (died 2014)
- 1929 – April Stevens, American singer (died 2023)
- 1929 – Maurice Strong, Canadian businessman and diplomat (died 2015)
- 1929 – Jeremy Thorpe, English lawyer and politician (died 2014)
- 1930 – Jean Rochefort, French actor and director (died 2017)
- 1931 – Frank Auerbach, German-British painter (died 2024)
- 1931 – Lonnie Donegan, Scottish-English singer-songwriter and guitarist (died 2002)
- 1931 – Chris Pearson, Canadian politician, 1st Premier of Yukon (died 2014)
- 1932 – David Tindle, English painter and educator
- 1932 – Dmitry Zaikin, Soviet pilot and cosmonaut instructor (died 2013)
- 1933 – Ed Charles, American baseball player and coach (died 2018)
- 1933 – Rod McKuen, American singer-songwriter and poet (died 2015)
- 1933 – Willie Nelson, American singer-songwriter, guitarist, producer and actor
- 1934 – Luis Aparicio, Venezuelan-American baseball player
- 1934 – Pedro Pires, Cape Verdean politician, 3rd President of Cape Verde
- 1935 – Otis Rush, American blues singer-songwriter and guitarist (died 2018)
- 1936 – Zubin Mehta, Indian conductor
- 1936 – Adolfo Nicolás, Spanish priest, 13th Superior General of the Society of Jesus (died 2020)
- 1936 – Alejandra Pizarnik, Argentine poet (died 1972)
- 1936 – Jacob Rothschild, 4th Baron Rothschild, English banker and philanthropist (died 2024)
- 1937 – Jill Paton Walsh, English author (died 2020)
- 1938 – Steven Bach, American writer, businessman and educator (died 2009)
- 1938 – Bernie Madoff, American businessman, financier and convicted felon (died 2021)
- 1939 – Klaus Rinke, German artist (died 2026)
- 1940 – George Adams, American musician (died 1992)
- 1940 – Peter Diamond, American economist
- 1941 – Hanne Darboven, German painter (died 2009)
- 1942 – Dick Chrysler, American politician
- 1942 – Rennie Fritchie, Baroness Fritchie, English civil servant and academic
- 1943 – Duane Allen, American country singer
- 1943 – Brenda Dean, Baroness Dean of Thornton-le-Fylde, English union leader and politician (died 2018)
- 1943 – Ruth Deech, Baroness Deech, English lawyer and academic
- 1944 – Francis Lee, English footballer and businessman (died 2023)
- 1945 – Hugh Hopper, English bass guitarist (died 2009)
- 1945 – Catherine Lara, French singer-songwriter and violinist
- 1945 – Tammi Terrell, American soul singer-songwriter (died 1970)
- 1946 – Rodney Frelinghuysen, American politician and lobbyist
- 1947 – Tommy James, American singer-songwriter, guitarist and producer
- 1947 – Johnny Miller, American golfer and sportscaster
- 1947 – Jim Ryun, American runner and politician
- 1948 – Edith Brown Clement, American judge
- 1950 – Paul Holmes, New Zealand journalist (died 2013)
- 1950 – Phillip Noyce, Australian director and producer
- 1950 – Debbie Stabenow, American social worker and politician
- 1951 – Dale Earnhardt, American race car driver (died 2001)
- 1951 – Jon Stanhope, Australian politician
- 1952 – Geraldine Doogue, Australian journalist and television host
- 1952 – Nora Dunn, American actress and comedian
- 1952 – Bob McClure, American baseball player and coach
- 1952 – Dave Valentin, American flautist (died 2017)
- 1953 – Bill Drummond, British musician
- 1954 – Mo Brooks, American attorney and politician
- 1954 – Jerry Seinfeld, American comedian, actor and producer
- 1955 – Leslie Jordan, American actor, comedian, writer and singer (died 2022)
- 1955 – Kate Mulgrew, American actress
- 1957 – Daniel Day-Lewis, British actor
- 1957 – Fiamē Naomi Mataʻafa, Samoan politician, 7th Prime Minister of Samoa
- 1957 – Joseph Morelle, American politician
- 1958 – Kevin Moore, English footballer (died 2013)
- 1958 – Michelle Pfeiffer, American actress
- 1958 – Eve Plumb, American actress
- 1960 – Robert J. Sawyer, Canadian author and academic
- 1962 – Polly Samson, English novelist, lyricist and journalist
- 1963 – Mike Babcock, Canadian ice hockey player and coach
- 1964 – Federico Castelluccio, Italian-American actor, director, producer and screenwriter
- 1964 – Lúðvík Bergvinsson, Icelandic politician
- 1965 – Michel Bussi, French geographer, author, and academic
- 1965 – Amy Krouse Rosenthal, American author (died 2017)
- 1966 – Christian Tetzlaff, German violinist
- 1968 – Kolinda Grabar-Kitarović, Croatian politician and diplomat, 4th President of Croatia
- 1969 – Paul Adelstein, American actor and writer
- 1970 – Andre Agassi, American tennis player
- 1970 – Uma Thurman, American actress
- 1975 – Garrison Starr, American singer-songwriter and producer
- 1975 – April Telek, Canadian actress
- 1976 – Micol Ostow, American author, editor and educator
- 1976 – God Shammgod, American basketball player and coach
- 1977 – Zuzana Hejdová, Czech tennis player
- 1977 – Claus Jensen, Danish international footballer and manager
- 1977 – David Sullivan, American film and television actor
- 1978 – Bob Bryan, American tennis player
- 1978 – Mike Bryan, American tennis player
- 1978 – Javier Colon, American singer-songwriter and musician
- 1978 – Tyler Labine, Canadian actor and comedian
- 1979 – Lee Dong-gook, South Korean footballer
- 1979 – Jo O'Meara, English pop singer
- 1980 – Mathieu Biron, Canadian ice hockey player
- 1980 – Bre Blair, Canadian actress
- 1981 – George McCartney, Northern Irish footballer
- 1983 – Megan Boone, American actress
- 1983 – Jay Cutler, American football player
- 1983 – Sam Jones III, American actor
- 1984 – Kirby Cote, Canadian swimmer
- 1984 – Lina Krasnoroutskaya, Russian tennis player
- 1986 – Byun Yo-han, South Korean actor
- 1986 – Lee Chae-young, South Korean actress
- 1987 – Rob Atkinson, English footballer
- 1987 – Sara Errani, Italian tennis player
- 1987 – Andre Russell, Jamaican cricketer
- 1988 – Alfred Hui, Hong Kong singer
- 1988 – Taoufik Makhloufi, Algerian athlete
- 1988 – Jonathan Toews, Canadian ice hockey player
- 1988 – Younha, South Korean singer-songwriter and record producer
- 1989 – Candace Owens, American political commentator and activist
- 1989 – Domagoj Vida, Croatian footballer
- 1990 – James Faulkner, Australian cricketer
- 1990 – Chris Johnson, American basketball player
- 1991 – Adam Smith, English footballer
- 1991 – Jung Hye-sung, South Korean actress
- 1991 – Misaki Doi, Japanese tennis player
- 1992 – Alina Rosenberg, German paralympic equestrian
- 1994 – Christina Shakovets, German tennis player
- 1996 – Katherine Langford, Australian actress
- 1997 – Lucas Tousart, French footballer
- 1998 – Kimberly Birrell, Australian tennis player
- 1998 – Mallory Pugh, American soccer player
- 1999 – Mateo Retegui, Argentine-Italian footballer
- 2001 – Danilo, Brazilian footballer
- 2006 – Xochitl Gomez, American actress
- 2007 – Mirra Andreeva, Russian tennis player
- 2007 – Infanta Sofía of Spain, Spanish princess

== Deaths ==
=== Pre-1600 ===
- 1109 – Hugh of Cluny, French abbot (born 1024)
- 1380 – Catherine of Siena, Italian mystic, philosopher and saint (born 1347)
- 1594 – Thomas Cooper, English bishop, lexicographer, and theologian (born 1517)

=== 1601–1900 ===
- 1630 – Agrippa d'Aubigné, French soldier and poet (born 1552)
- 1658 – John Cleveland, English poet and author (born 1613)
- 1676 – Michiel de Ruyter, Dutch admiral (born 1607)
- 1707 – George Farquhar, Irish-English actor and playwright (born 1678)
- 1768 – Georg Brandt, Swedish chemist and mineralogist (born 1694)
- 1776 – Edward Wortley Montagu, English explorer and author (born 1713)
- 1833 – William Babington, Anglo-Irish physician and mineralogist (born 1756)
- 1848 – Chester Ashley, American politician (born 1790)
- 1854 – Henry Paget, 1st Marquess of Anglesey, English field marshal and politician, Lord Lieutenant of Ireland (born 1768)

=== 1901–present ===
- 1903 – Godfrey Carter, Australian businessman and politician, 39th Mayor of Melbourne (born 1830)
- 1903 – Paul Du Chaillu, French-American anthropologist and zoologist (born 1835)
- 1905 – Ignacio Cervantes, Cuban pianist and composer (born 1847)
- 1916 – Jørgen Pedersen Gram, Danish mathematician and academic (born 1850)
- 1917 – Florence Farr, British actress, composer and director (born 1860)
- 1922 – Richard Croker, Irish American political boss (born 1843)
- 1924 – Ernest Fox Nichols, American educator and physicist (born 1869)
- 1925 – Ralph Delahaye Paine, American journalist and author (born 1871)
- 1933 – Clay Stone Briggs, American politician (born 1876)
- 1933 – Constantine P. Cavafy, Greek poet and journalist (born 1863)
- 1935 – Leroy Carr, American singer, songwriter and pianist (born 1905)
- 1937 – William Gillette, American actor and playwright (born 1853)
- 1943 – Joseph Achron, Russian composer and violinist (born 1886)
- 1943 – Ricardo Viñes, Spanish pianist (born 1875)
- 1944 – Billy Bitzer, American cinematographer (born 1872)
- 1944 – Pyotr Stolyarsky, Soviet violinist (born 1871)
- 1947 – Irving Fisher, American economist and statistician (born 1867)
- 1951 – Ludwig Wittgenstein, Austrian-English philosopher and academic (born 1889)
- 1956 – Wilhelm Ritter von Leeb, German field marshal and convicted war criminal (born 1876)
- 1959 – Kenneth Anderson, English soldier and Governor of Gibraltar (born 1891)
- 1966 – William Eccles, English physicist and engineer (born 1875)
- 1966 – Paula Strasberg, American actress and acting coach (born 1909)
- 1967 – J. B. Lenoir, American singer-songwriter and guitarist (born 1929)
- 1968 – Aasa Helgesen, Norwegian midwife (born 1877)
- 1968 – Lin Zhao, Chinese dissident (born 1932)
- 1978 – Theo Helfrich, German race car driver (born 1913)
- 1979 – Muhsin Ertuğrul, Turkish actor and director (born 1892)
- 1979 – Hardie Gramatky, American author and illustrator (born 1907)
- 1980 – Alfred Hitchcock, English-American director and producer (born 1899)
- 1982 – Raymond Bussières, French actor, producer and screenwriter (born 1907)
- 1992 – Mae Clarke, American actress (born 1910)
- 1993 – Michael Gordon, American actor and director (born 1909)
- 1993 – Mick Ronson, English guitarist, songwriter and producer (born 1946)
- 1997 – Mike Royko, American journalist and author (born 1932)
- 2000 – Phạm Văn Đồng, Vietnamese lieutenant and politician, 2nd Prime Minister of Vietnam (born 1906)
- 2001 – Arthur B. C. Walker Jr., American physicist and academic (born 1936)
- 2002 – Bob Akin, American race car driver and journalist (born 1936)
- 2003 – Janko Bobetko, Croatian Army general and Chief of the General Staff (born 1919)
- 2004 – John Henniker-Major, British diplomat and civil servant (born 1916)
- 2005 – William J. Bell, American screenwriter and producer (born 1927)
- 2005 – Louis Leithold, American mathematician and academic (born 1924)
- 2006 – John Kenneth Galbraith, Canadian-American economist and diplomat, United States Ambassador to India (born 1908)
- 2007 – Josh Hancock, American baseball player (born 1978)
- 2007 – Dick Motz, New Zealand cricketer and rugby player (born 1940)
- 2007 – Ivica Račan, Croatian politician, 7th Prime Minister of Croatia (born 1944)
- 2008 – Gordon Bradley, English-American footballer (born 1933)
- 2008 – Albert Hofmann, Swiss chemist and academic (born 1906)
- 2010 – Avigdor Arikha, French-Israeli artist, printmaker and art historian (born 1929)
- 2011 – Siamak Pourzand, Iranian journalist and critic (born 1931)
- 2011 – Joanna Russ, American writer, academic and radical feminist (born 1937)
- 2012 – Shukri Ghanem, Libyan politician, 22nd Prime Minister of Libya (born 1942)
- 2012 – Joel Goldsmith, American composer and conductor (born 1957)
- 2012 – Roland Moreno. French engineer, invented the smart card (born 1945)
- 2012 – Kenny Roberts, American singer-songwriter (born 1926)
- 2013 – Alex Elisala, New Zealand-Australian rugby player (born 1992)
- 2013 – Pesah Grupper, Israeli politician, 13th Israel Minister of Agriculture (born 1924)
- 2013 – John La Montaine, American pianist and composer (born 1920)
- 2013 – Kevin Moore, English footballer (born 1958)
- 2013 – Marianna Zachariadi, Greek pole vaulter (born 1990)
- 2014 – Iveta Bartošová, Czech singer and actress (born 1966)
- 2014 – Al Feldstein, American author and illustrator (born 1925)
- 2014 – Bob Hoskins, English actor (born 1942)
- 2015 – François Michelin, French businessman (born 1926)
- 2015 – Jean Nidetch, American businesswoman, co-founded Weight Watchers (born 1923)
- 2015 – Calvin Peete, American golfer (born 1943)
- 2015 – Dan Walker, American lawyer and politician, 36th Governor of Illinois (born 1922)
- 2016 – Dmytro Hnatyuk, Ukrainian singer (born 1925)
- 2016 – Renato Corona, Filipino lawyer and jurist, 23rd Chief Justice of the Supreme Court of the Philippines (born 1948)
- 2017 – R. Vidyasagar Rao, Indian bureaucrat and activist (born 1939)
- 2018 – Luis García Meza, Bolivian general, 57th President of Bolivia (born 1929)
- 2018 – Michael Martin, British politician (born 1945)
- 2019 – Josef Šural, Czech footballer (born 1990)
- 2020 – Irrfan Khan, Indian actor (born 1967)
- 2020 – Guido Münch, Mexican astronomer and astrophysicist (born 1921)
- 2021 – Cate Haste, English author (born 1945)
- 2022 – Joanna Barnes, American actress and writer (born 1934)
- 2023 – Padma Desai, Indian-American development economist (born 1931)

== Holidays and observances ==
- Christian feast day:
  - Catherine of Siena (Catholic, Lutheran and Anglican Church)
  - Hugh of Cluny
  - Robert of Molesme
  - Wilfrid II
  - April 29 (Eastern Orthodox liturgics)
- International Dance Day (UNESCO)
- Shōwa Day, traditionally the start of the Golden Week holiday period, which is April 29 and May 3–5. (Japan)
