= R. Vidyasagar Rao Dindi Lift Irrigation Scheme =

Coordinates: 16°32′10″N 78°39′40″E

Dindi Lift Irrigation Scheme
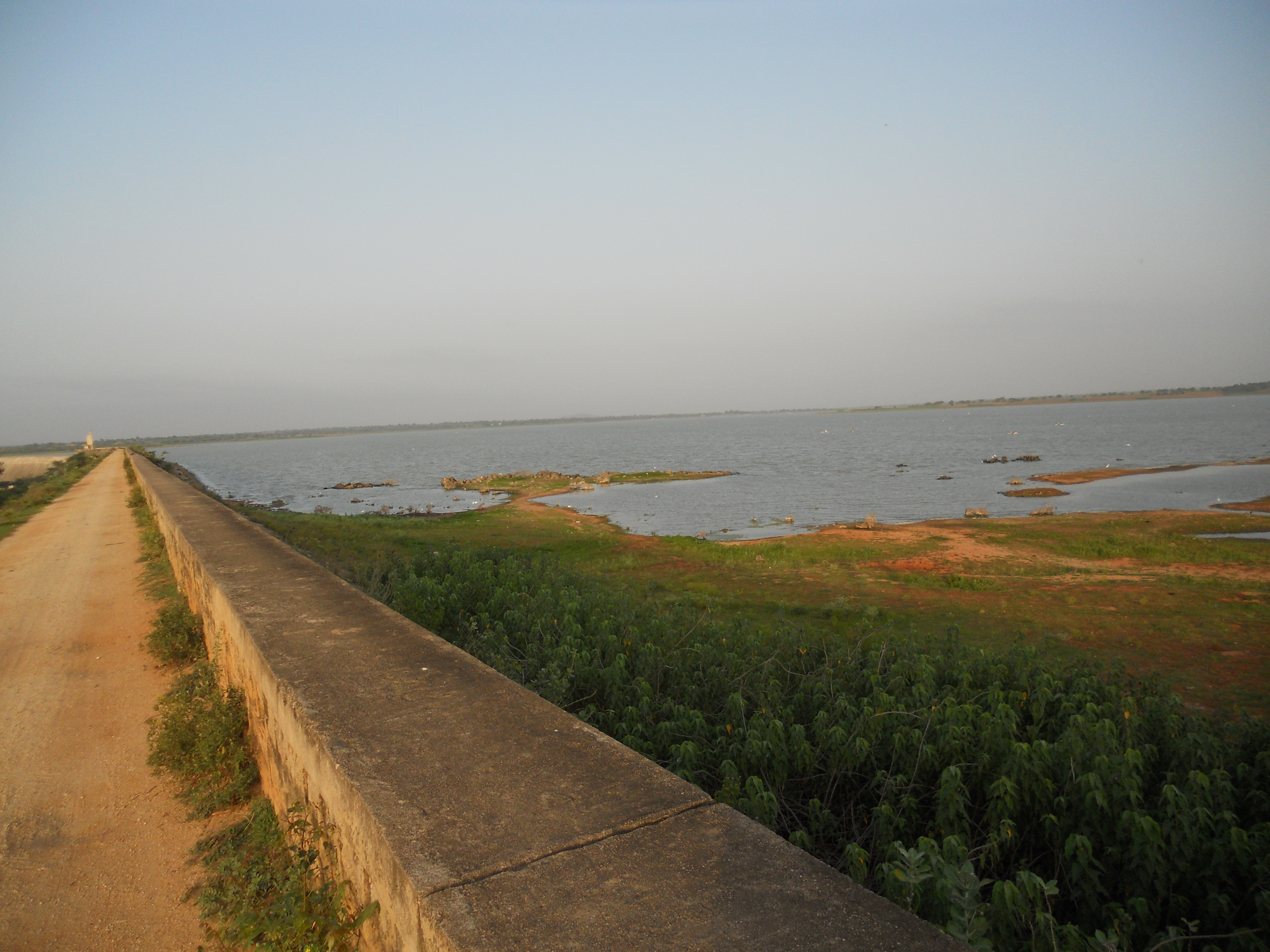
- Dindi Reservoir

- Location within India Location within Telangana
- Location: Telangana, India
- Purpose: Irrigation, power, and transport
- Status: Completed/Inaugurated
- Owner: Telangana Irrigation Department
- Operator: Telangana Irrigation Department

Dam and spillways
- Height: up to top of earth dam above the lowest river bed.
- Spillway type: Chute spillway

R. Vidyasagar Rao Dindi Lift Irrigation Scheme is a lift irrigation project in Nalgonda, Telangana, India. It serves Nalgonda, Mahbubnagar and Khammam areas. It was named after R. Vidyasagar Rao, an irrigation expert in Telangana.

== Dindi reservoir ==
Dindi Reservoir is a medium water reservoir across Dindi tributary of River Krishna located near Dindi, Mahabubnagar town in Telangana. It is part of Srisailam Left Bank Canal.

This medium reservoir has 59 million cubic meters gross storage capacity. It is close to Amrabad Tiger Reserve, around 95 kilometers from Hyderabad.

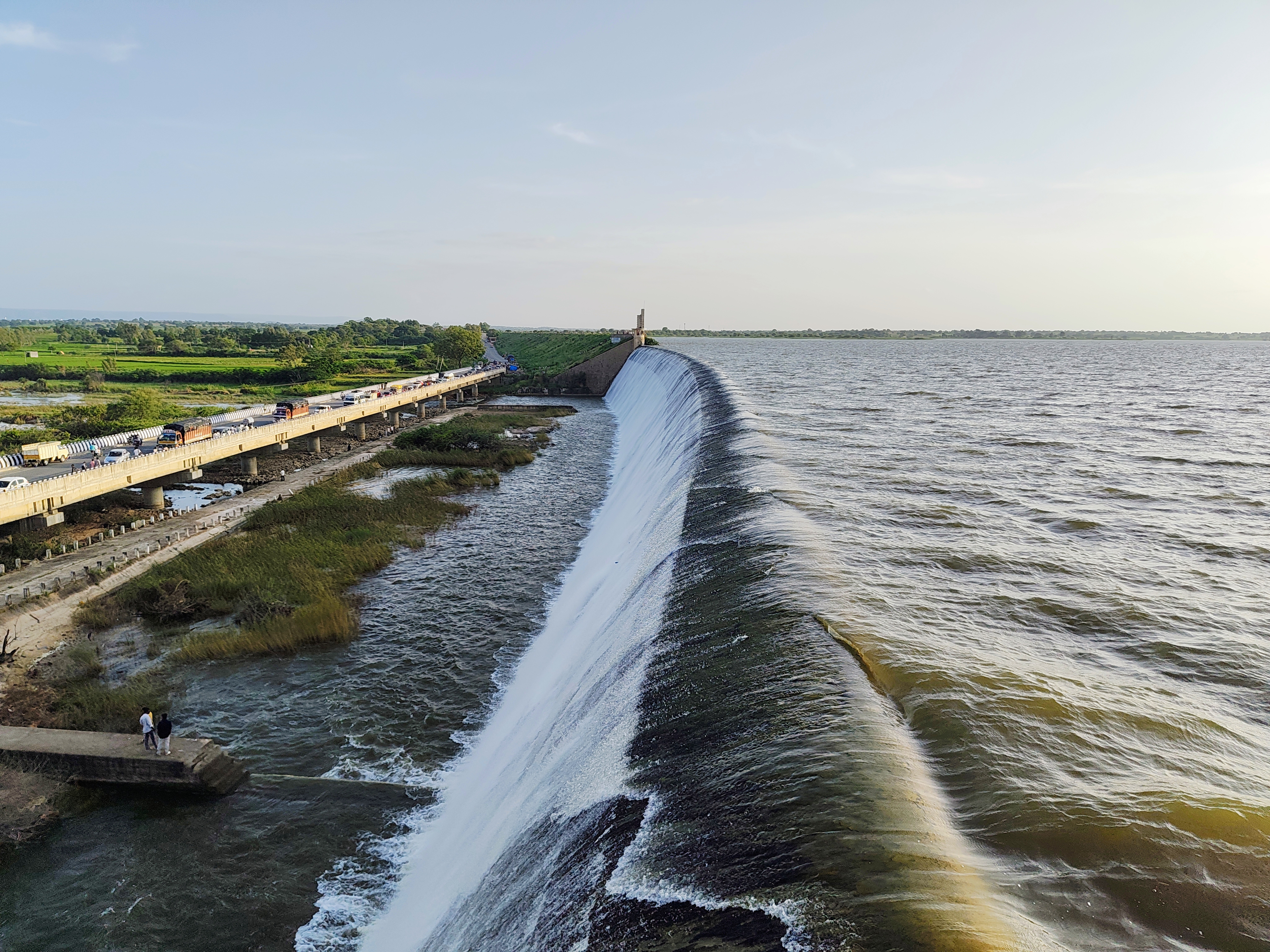
Dindi Reservoir Srisailam Highway Telangana India

== See also ==
- Mahatma Gandhi Kalwakurthy lift irrigation scheme
- Srisailam Dam
