= Peddakarpamula =

- Village
- Nickname: Karpamula
- Location in Telangana, India Peddakarpamula (India)
- Coordinates: 16.2920842°N 78.3636253°E
- Country: India
- State: Telangana
- District: NagarKurnool

Population (2011)
  - Total: 4,257

Languages
  - Official: Telugu
- Time zone: UTC+5:30 (IST)
- PIN: 509412
- Vehicle registration: TS

Peddakarpamula is a village in Nagarkurnool district, Telangana, India, 24 km from Nagar Kurnool. It is the major gram panchayat in Kollapur constituency. As of 2025, the MLA is Mr. Jupally Krishna Rao.

== Demography ==
The village is administrated by a Sarpanch who is an elected representative of village as per constitution of India and Panchayati raj (India).

Particulars	Total	Male	Female
Total No. of Houses	917		
Population	4,257	2,175	2,082
Child (0-6)	557	298	259
Schedule Caste	879	443	436
Schedule Tribe	35	19	16
Literacy	45.95 %	54.98 %	36.64 %
Total Workers	2,238	1,210	1,028
Main Worker	2,074	1,173	901
Marginal Worker	164	37	127
NRI	Ram Mohan Sonte		
