= Pedda Kothapalle =

Pedda Kotha Pally
- Mondal
- Nickname: PKP
- Interactive map of Pedda Kotha Pally
- Coordinates: 16.297806°N 78.360070°E
- Country: India
- State: Telangana
- District: Nagarkurnool

Languages
  - Official: Telugu
- Time zone: UTC+5:30 (IST)
- Postal code: 509412
- Vehicle registration: TS 06
- Climate: hot (Köppen)

Pedda Kotha Pally is a Mandal in Nagarkurnool district, Telangana.

== Villages ==
The villages in Peddakothapally mandal include:

- Permandlapally
- Mustipally
- Marikal
- Chandrakal
- Sanjeevapoor
- Chennapuraopally
- Chinna karupamula
- Chinna kothapally
- Devalthirumalapur
- Gantraopally
- Jonnalaboguda
- Kalwakole
- Maredudinne
- Narayanapally
- Peddakarpamula
- Pedda kotha pally
- Sathapur
- Vennacharla
- Yapatla
