= R. Vidyasagar Rao =

Indian politician

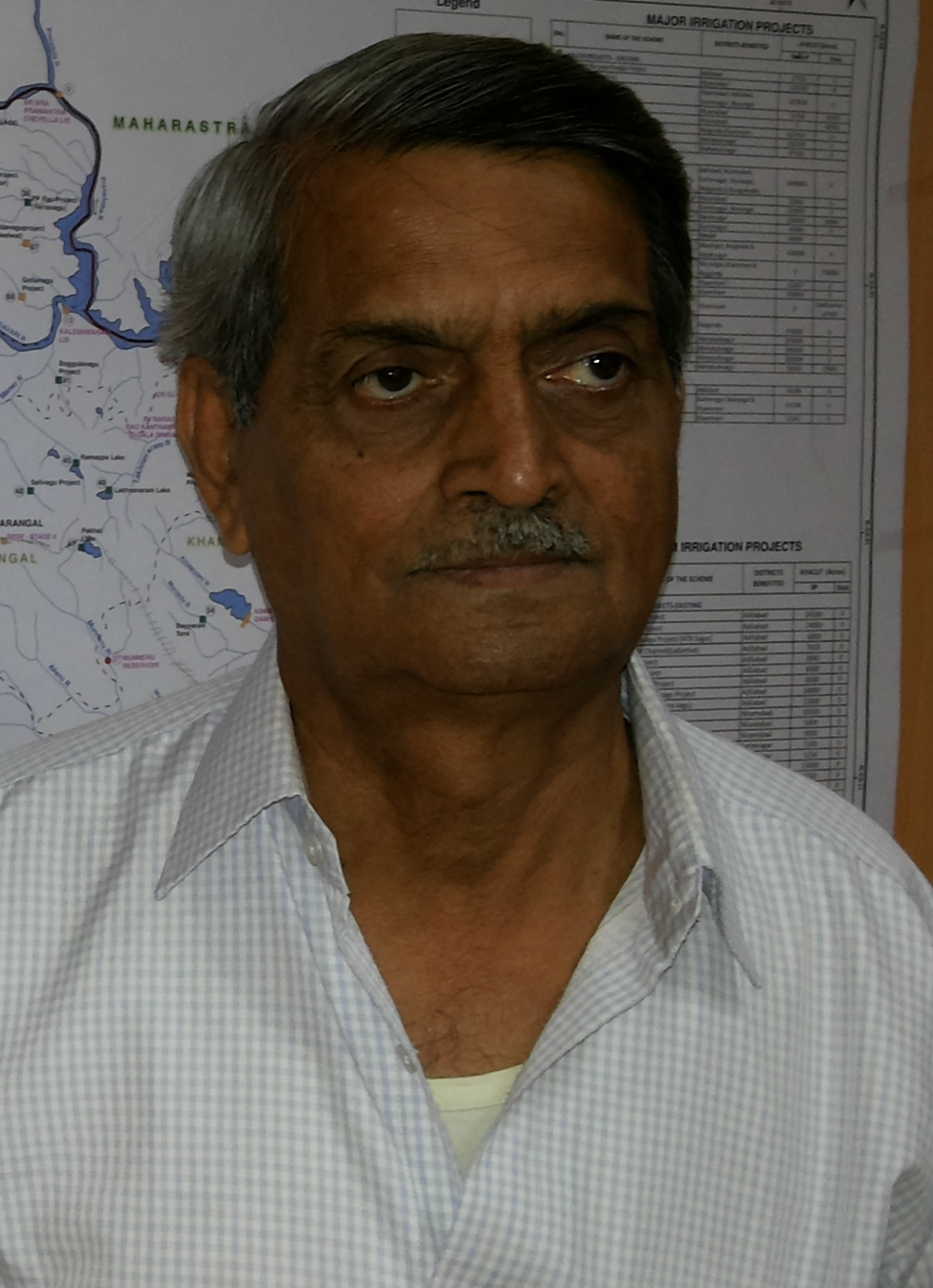
- Vidyasagar Rao in 2015
- Born: 14 November 1939; Suryapet, Hyderabad State (now in Telangana State), India
- Died: 29 April 2017 (aged 77); Hyderabad, Telangana, India
- Education: Osmania University Hyderabad
- Occupations: Educator; Social Activist; Telangana Ideologue

Ramaraju Vidyasagar Rao (14 November 1939 – 29 April 2017) was an Indian government administrator and a Telangana activist. He was the Chief Engineer of the Ministry of Water Resources, Central Water Commission. After the formation of Telangana State, he was appointed as the Advisor on Irrigation to the Government of Telangana. He was the foremost expert on irrigation projects in Telangana, and was instrumental in highlighting injustices in water allocation for Telangana Region in United Andhra Pradesh.

The Dindi Lift Irrigation Scheme was named after him as R. Vidyasagar Rao Dindi Lift Irrigation Scheme for his enormous contribution to irrigation in Telangana. He fought for safe drinking water to the fluoride-affected Nalgonda district and provide water to the arid lands in the Telangana region.

== Early years ==
Rao was a native of Jajireddygudem village, Suryapet, Nalgonda District. He was born to R Raghava Rao, a government school teacher and R. Lakshmamma, a housewife. Because of his father's frequent transfers, Vidyasagar Rao completed his primary and upper primary schooling in Huzurnagar and Miryalaguda, Higher Secondary School in Suryapet, and PUC in Nizam College, Hyderabad. He received his Bachelor of Engineering from Osmania University, Hyderabad, India in 1960 and his Master of Engineering in Water Resources Development University of Roorkee (Now IIT Roorkee) in 1979. He also earned his diploma in Water Resources Systems Engineering at Colorado State University (USA) in 1983. He also earned a Bachelor of Law at Delhi University in 1990.

== Career ==
He started his career with Irrigation Department as Junior Engineer, Government of Andhra Pradesh, in 1960. After three years, he left the State Government and joined Central Water Commission.

=== Central Water Commission ===
He worked in the Central Water Commission, Ministry of Water Resources, government of India in various capacities and retired as chief engineer in 1997.

=== United Nations ===
He also worked as a consultant to the United Nations Environmental Programme (UNEP) at Nairobi (Kenya) and Addis Ababa (Ethiopia) during November–December, 1991.

=== Government of India ===
He served as member of Working Group of Major, Medium Irrigation & Command Area Development Project for XII Five Year Plan of Planning Commission, government of India. Rao also served as Resources Person, National Commission for integrated Water Resources Development Plan, Government of India, responsible for preparation of working group report on legal, institutional and financial aspects. He also worked as a consultant to NABARD responsible for appraisal and monitoring of Irrigation schemes of Government of AP posed for financial assistance to NABARD.

As arbitrator for settling disputes arising out of World Bank assisted Canal Project, Government of U.P.

He visited several countries all over the globe under UN related organisations' programmes. He was Life Member of Indian Water Resources, Life Member of Indian Network on Participatory Irrigation Management and Individual Member of Indian Council of Arbitration.

== Telangana activist ==
Rao helped people understand complex water issues by speaking to them in simple Telugu. He contributed more than 100 articles to several Indian news publications, Vaartha, Andhra Jyothi, Eenadu and Namaste Telangana on water-related issues and put out two volumes of Neellu-Nijalu, an anthology of published essays.

As a water resources expert, he spread awareness on water issues among students, intellectuals and the general public through seminars and media, Rao addresses media on deliberations and the Telangana government's views regarding water issues. He has written about technical and environmental issues, e.g. on the Polavaram project.

He worked in the agitation for Separate Telangana State along with Prof. Jayashankar, ideologue of Telangana Movement and K. Chandrasekhar Rao, Head of Telangana Rashtra Samiti and Chief Minister of Telangana State. He has laid strong basis for the movement by disseminating injustices meted out to Telangana Region in united Andhra Pradesh in irrigation. He delivered lectures and wrote essays in a simple language, along with the statistics from original and authentic sources and documents, so that common man can also understand. His writings on water issues and sufferings of Telangana are published in various newspapers in English and Telugu dailies.

== Advisor to Telangana government ==
Rao has been the main irrigation thinktank for Telangana State. In the planning and redesigning of Kaleshwaram Project, Palamuru-Rangareddy Lift Irrigation Scheme, Dindi Lift Irrigation Project, Devadula Project, Kanthanapalli project, Sitarama Project etc., in coordinating interstate agreements with Maharashtra, in formulation of rejuvenation and renovation of tanks, Mission Kakatiya, O&M guidelines for Lift Irrigation schemes etc. his contribution is enormous.

His initiation in abandoning Dummugudem- Nagarjunasagar Tail Pond project and leaving Ichamapalli project for long term perspective etc. had given right direction to the progress of irrigation in Telangana. He defended big lift irrigation schemes, namely Kaleshwaram and Palamuru-Rangareddy Lift Irrigation Scheme projects, for Telangana State as they are inevitable due to geographical and climatic conditions of the state. Advisor's contributions in establishing a firm base for interstate aspects on water front for Telangana will remain remembered forever. In Krishna Water Disputes Tribunal issues or Supreme Court issues he was always the guiding force. He always worked with accommodation and audacity. Without antagonising the Central Government's view of interlinking of rivers, while representing Telangana State at meetings of National Water Development Agency, he advocated for revision of surplus waters available at Ichampalli, keeping the Tribunal Awards and changed technological advancements also in view. He presented that the surplus waters above 50% dependability can be diverted. In response, Ministry of Water Resources has constituted a committee to revise the guidelines to calculate the surplus river waters in the country. Getting the nod from Chief Minister KCR, Advisor Vidyasagar Rao attended the KRMB Meeting in October,2014. It was turning point in the functioning of KRMB. Explaining the relevant Clauses of the AP Reorganisation Act, 2014 and supremacy of the Tribunal Award, Vidyasagar Rao could establish that KRMB did not have the powers to allocate the waters on its own. The then Chairman of KRMB accepted the substance of the arguments. Either Bachawat Tribunal Award or agreed quantities by both the States shall only be the basis for distribution of available waters by the Board, whether it is for Krishna Delta, or from NSP and Srisailam Reservoirs.

In June, 2015 to avoid any troubles in the coming year 2015-16, Mr Rao played a major role in arriving at an adhoc arrangement, for sharing of Krishna waters, in a temporary ratio of 299 : 512, Telangana and Andhra Pradesh respectively. He was also able to clarify the concept of ‘enbloc’ allocations of the Tribunal which paved way for utilisation of Krishna river waters anywhere in the basin as per requirement. Because of these arrangements, the water sharing for that year happened without any problems. And, in June, 2016, the same arrangement had been extended for this water year 2016-17 also. On the basis of Tribunal Awards, Vidyasagar Rao strongly advocated for rightful share to Telangana State in the waters diverted from Godavari to Krishna River. At Godavari River Management Board meetings also, acumen of Advisor Vidyasagar Rao could stall the Andhra Pradesh intentions of putting control of Major Projects on Godavari River within Telangana State, into the hands of Godavari River Management Board (GRMB). At National Seminar on Minor Irrigation Projects 'Mission Kakatiya' organised by Kakatiya University, Telangana State, in November,2016, Rao was chief guest and addressed the participants and expalained about Government policies on Irrigation Projects.

== Awards, recognitions, charities ==
- In 2014, Institute of Engineers (India) has awarded Leading Engineering Personalities of India for their contributions to the Engineering field.
- The Sub- Market Yard at Jajireddygudem established in January, 2018 is named as "Late Sri Rama Raju Vidyasagar Rao Sub-Market Yard, Jajireddygudem".
- The prestigious Dindi Lift Irrigation Scheme taken up by the State Government to provide safe drinking water and irrigation facilities to fluoride-affected and drought-prone areas is named after him as R. Vidyasagar Rao Dindi Lift Irrigation Scheme.
- His Birth Day is being celebrated every year by the people of the State as 'Telangana Irrigation Day'. On his 81st Birth Anniversary and 4th Telangana Irrigation Day, 14-11-2020, two statues of Mr Rao are unveiled, one at Telangana Engineers Association Building, Errummanzil and another at Irrigation Department Head Office 'Jala Soudha', Errummanzil, Hyderabad by Minister Sri Jagadishwar Reddy. A meeting celebrating the Irrigation Day is conducted at Institute of Engineers India, Khairatabad.

== Philanthropy ==
Along with his brothers he donated his land, where his old house existed, to the villagers to take up a Community Hall. The construction work of community hall was taken up by the State Government and expected to be completed by April, 2018.

On his request, age old 'Sri Yogananda Laxmi Narsimha Swamy Temple' Aravapalli (V), Jajireddygudem (M) of Suryapet District is being renovated by the Telangana State Govt.

== Acting and writing career ==
Vidyasagar Rao was also a well known theatre personality. From 1960 to 1985, as a theatre actor he performed many plays throughout India. Rao wrote 12 Telugu plays that were staged at different places as well as wrote a script for Television Serials.

His selected plays were performed in the Ravindra Bharathi Hyderabad on 18 to 20 May 2017 by Telangana Bhasha Sanskritika Shaakha and Telangana Theatre research centre with the cooperation of Minister for Irrigation, Harish Rao. 'R Vidyasagar Rao- Naatakaalu Naatikalu' was also released.

Mr Rao had been advocating for execution of Kaleshwaram Project and its early completion. He actively participated in the re-engineering of the project so as to make it more viable and helpful for the people of Telangana. A book on Kaleshwaram Project titled "Telangana Jeevadhaara - Kaleshwaram Project" which also included two important articles written by Mr Rao in 2016, was released by Telangana Retired Engineers Association in October, 2018.

=== Movies ===
He acted in N. Shankar's Jai bolo Telangana, a Telugu movie. He also acted in many films such as Dhammu, Banduku and others.

== Death ==
Rao died on 29 April 2017 from bladder-related cancer at a private hospital in Hyderabad. His funeral was carried out the following day.

On Rao's first death anniversary Telangana State Chief Minister KCR paid homage to the great soul and made visitation to Mr Rao's family members. Engineers and people of Telangana have also conducted several meetings across the State and remembered Mr Rao. On 29 April 2018 a commemorative meeting was held by Telangana Engineers at Institute of Engineers, Khairatabad. On his birthday on 14 Nov 2018 a book titled 'Jala Vignana Nidhi' containing articles written by eminent personalities from different fields commemorating Mr Rao, and another book containing his unpublished essays on irrigation with a title 'Neellu Nijalu - III' were released at Institute of Engineers.

== Bibliography ==
- Neellu - Nijaalu - An anthology of published essays (2 volumes)
