= Mahatma Gandhi Kalwakurthy lift irrigation scheme =

Irrigation project in Indian State of Telangana

- Location within India Location within Telangana
- Location: Mahabubnagar district, Telangana, India
- Coordinates: 16°06′05″N 78°23′59″E
- Purpose: Irrigation, Power, and Transport
- Status: Completed/Inaugurated
- Construction began: 1984
- Opening date: 16 October 2017
- Construction cost: ₹ 2,100 crores
- Owner: Telangana Irrigation Department
- Operator: Telangana Irrigation Department

Dam and spillways
- Impounds: Krishna River
- Height: up to top of earth dam above the lowest river bed.
- Spillway type: Chute spillway

Reservoir
- Total capacity: 67.52 TMCFT

Mahatma Gandhi Kalwakurthy Lift Irrigation Scheme (MGKLIS) is a lift irrigation project on River Krishna located in Mahbubnagar district in the Indian state of Telangana. The lift canal starts from the backwaters of Srisailam Dam near Kollapur. The gravity driven, 100 kilometer-long canal provides cultivation for nearly 137,000 hectares (340,000 acres)in 300 villages located in constituencies of Kollapur, Wanaparthy, Nagarkurnool, Kalwakurthy, Jadcherla, and Achampet.

== History ==
The foundation stone was laid in 1984. In 2014 the work started with a budget of ₹2100 crores. It was completed in October 2017, three decades later.

== Ayacut ==
The original design for the project was 20 TMC water capacity, later increased to 40 TMC. This project provides water to the most drought-prone areas in Mahbubnagar. The water is sourced from Krishna river, by lifting water 300 meters above river level and channeling it into the reservoir.

Achampet Branch Canal will be lengthened by 14 km, creating an additional ayacut of 15,000 acres (10,000 acres in Uppunuthala mandal and 5,000 acre) in Achampet mandal.

== Reservoirs ==
Around 51 balancing reservoirs with 20 TMC water capacity are proposed under MGKLIS, scheduled to be completed by June 2019.

The Buddaram Peddavagu Lake was proposed to be converted into a reservoir, and was completed in June 2019. With this reservoir, the lands under Wanaparthy district will get water for irrigation, ensuring continuous water flow.

== Water lifting ==
This project has three lifts, in Yellur (Kollapur mandal), in Jonnalaboguda village, and in Gudipally village. Reservoirs were to be constructed to store the water lifted from the river. This project serves water through canals which fill the lakes in five constituencies of erstwhile Mahabubnagar district.

=== Pumps ===
ABB partnered for industrial-strength water pumping technology with Andritz AG, to deploy five of its high-capacity 30-megawatt (MW), 11-kilovolt (kV) motors, each capable of pumping 23,000 litres per second. ABB also supplied substation equipment, transformers, and a digitally-enabled supervisory control and data acquisition (SCADA) monitoring system.
