= Kodair =

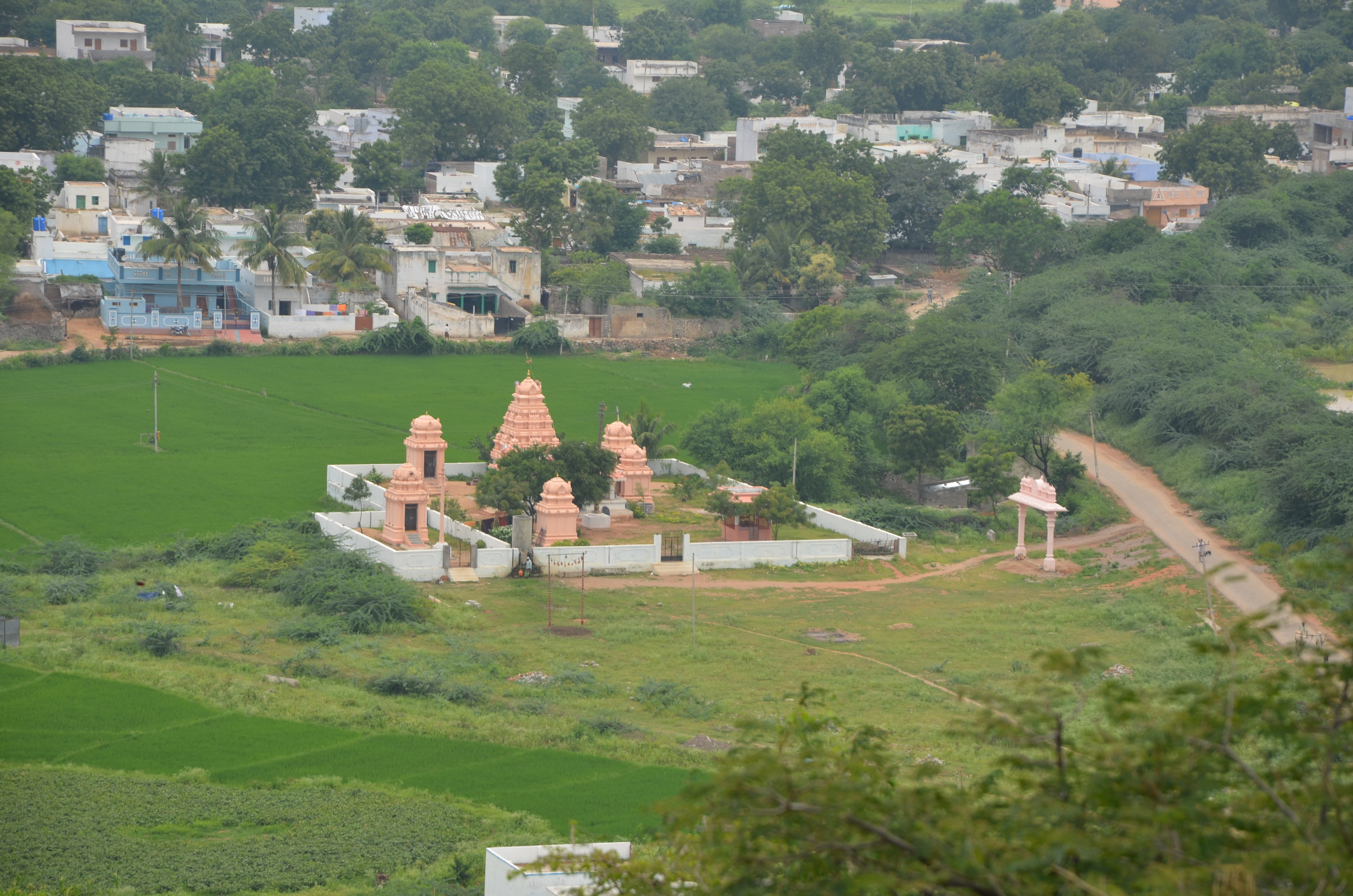
- View of the Kodair village from the near by hilltop (Balapala Gutta)

- Location in Telangana, India Kodair (India)
- Coordinates: 16.2667°N 78.3000°E
- Country: India
- State: Telangana
- District: Mahaboob Nagar

Government
  - Body: Gram Panchayat
- Elevation: 371 m (1,217 ft)

Population
  - Total: no

Languages
  - Official: Telugu
- Time zone: UTC+5:30 (IST)
- PIN: 509102
- Vehicle registration: TG 06
- Nearest city: Kollapur
- Lok Sabha constituency: Nagar Kurnool
- Vidhan Sabha constituency: Kollapur
- Civic agency: Gram Panchayat
- Climate: hot (Köppen)
- Website: telangana.gov.in

Koderu or Kodair is a village and mandal headquarters in Nagar Kurnool district, Telangana, India.

== Geography ==
Kodair is at coordinates 16.2667°N 78.3000°E on world map. It has an average elevation of 371 metres (1220 ft) from sea level.

Kodair is a village and mandal head quarter in Nagar Kurnoor district (it was Mahbub Nagar, before district reorganization) of Telangana state, previously united Andhra Pradesh State, India. It is km south of district headquarters Mahabubnagar, and 147 km south of the state capital, Hyderabad.

Kodair Mandal is bounded by Peddakothapally Mandal to the east, Pangal Mandal to the west, Kollapur Mandal to the south, Gopalpet Mandal to the west. Nagarkurnool City, Wanaparthy City, Gadwal City, Badepalle City are the nearby cities to Kodair.

Kodair consist of 35 villages and 15 Panchayats Khanapur is the smallest village, and Kodair is the largest village of all.

Srisailam, Mantralayam, Nagarjunasagar, Hyderabad, Kurnool are the nearby important tourist destinations to see.

Demographics of Kodair Mandal

Telugu is the local language here. Also people speak Hindi, Urdu. Total population of Kodair Mandal is 32,540, living in 6,942 houses, spread across total 35 villages and 15 panchayats. Males are 16,381 and females are 16,159.

Weather and climate of Kodair Mandal

It is too hot in summer. Kodair summer highest day temperature is in between 32 °C to 43 °C. Average temperatures of January is 27 °C, February is 27 °C, March is 31 °C, April is 34 °C, May is 35 °C.

== Institutions ==
- Zilla Parishad High School
- Boys Primary School
- Girls Primary School
- Kasturba Gandhi Balika Gurukula Vidyalayam
- Model High School (under construction, expected to open 2013)
- Kodair Gram Panchayat
- Mandal Revenue Office
- Mandal Development Office
- Primary Health Center
- Police Station
- Kodair Mandal Praja Parishad Karyalayam
- Sangameshwara Grameena Bank
- Veterinary dispensary (VD)

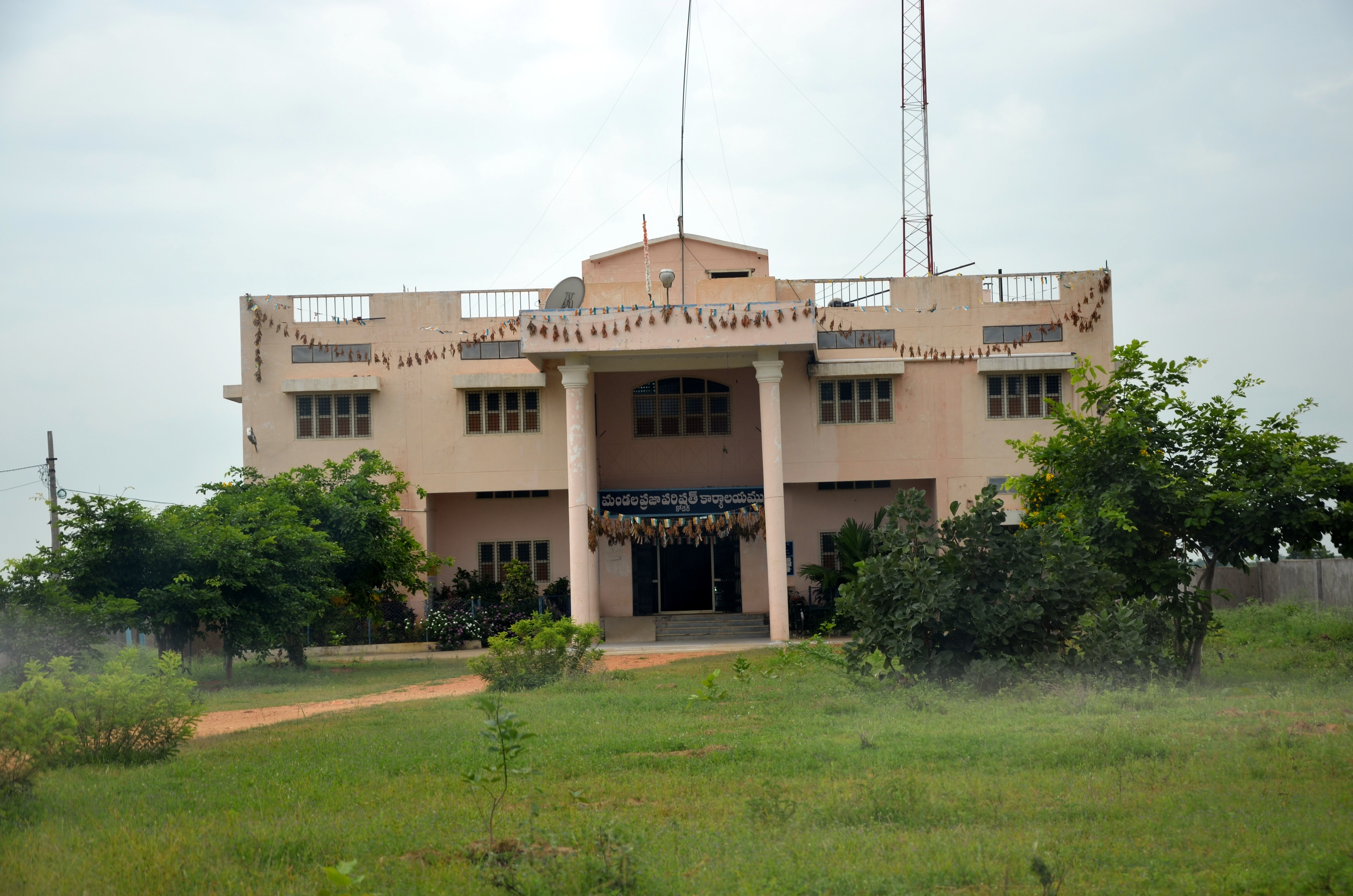
Kodair Mandal Praja Parishad office

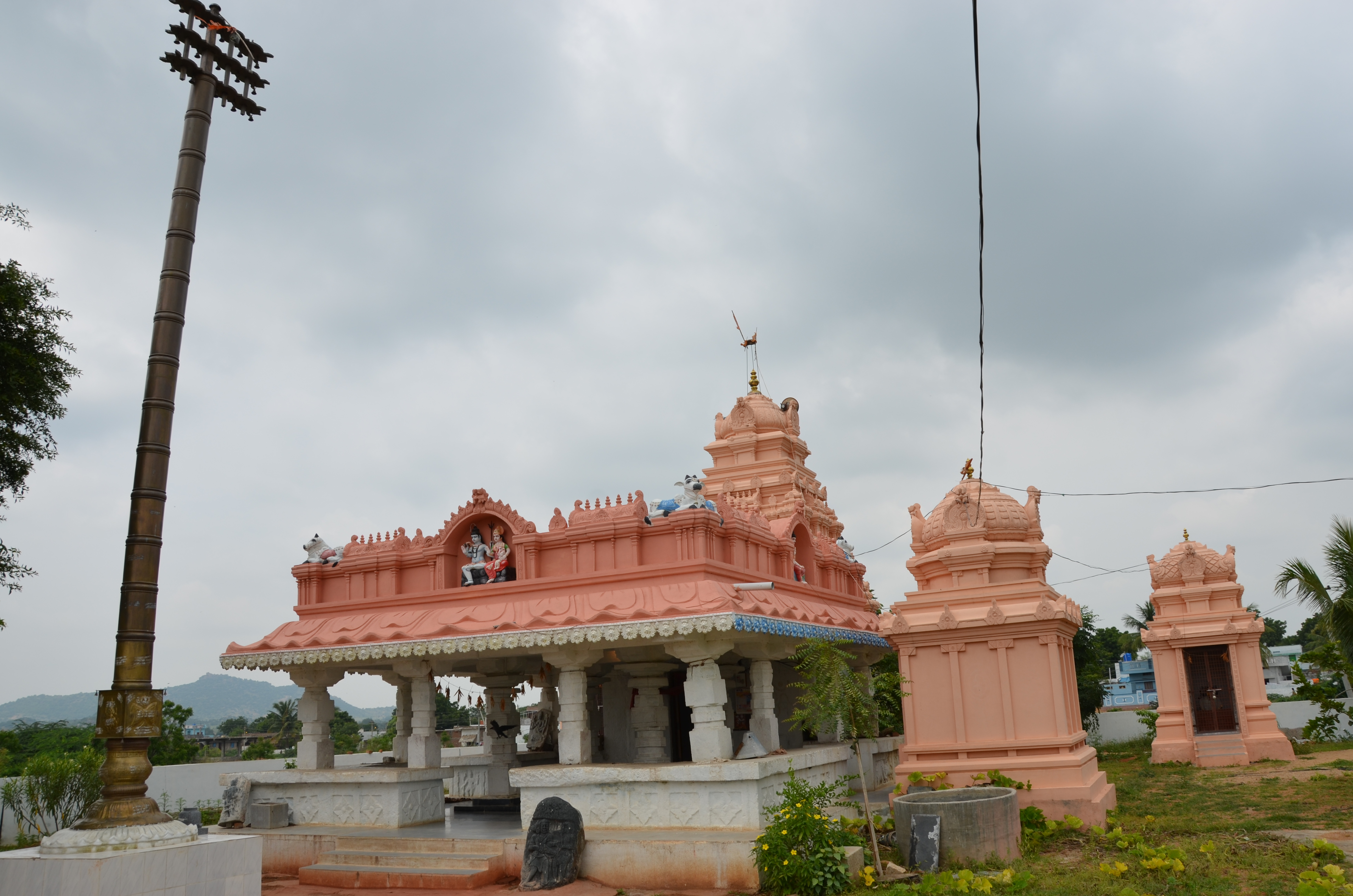
Kodair Shivalayam (Lord Shiva temple) after its reconstruction

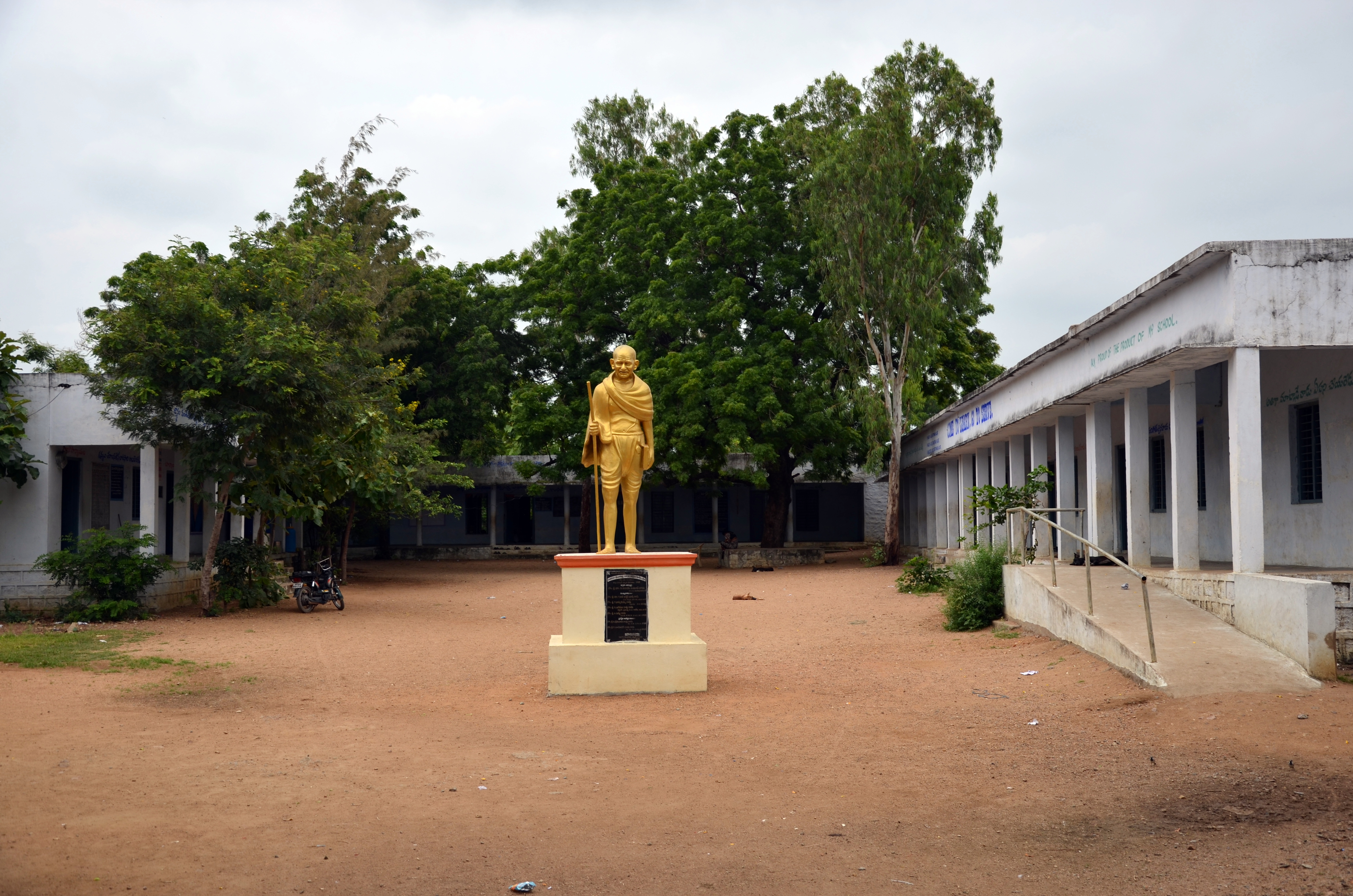
Kodair Zilla parishad High School, one of the oldest High Schools from this part of the region.

== Villages ==
The villages in Kodair mandal include:

- Bavaipally
- Janumpally
- Kadirepad
- Kodair
- Kondraopally
- Machupally
- Muthireddypally
- Mylaram
- Nagulapally &(Tanda)
- Narsaipally
- Pasupula
- Rajapur
- Turkadinne
- Singaipally
- Teegalapally
- Yetham

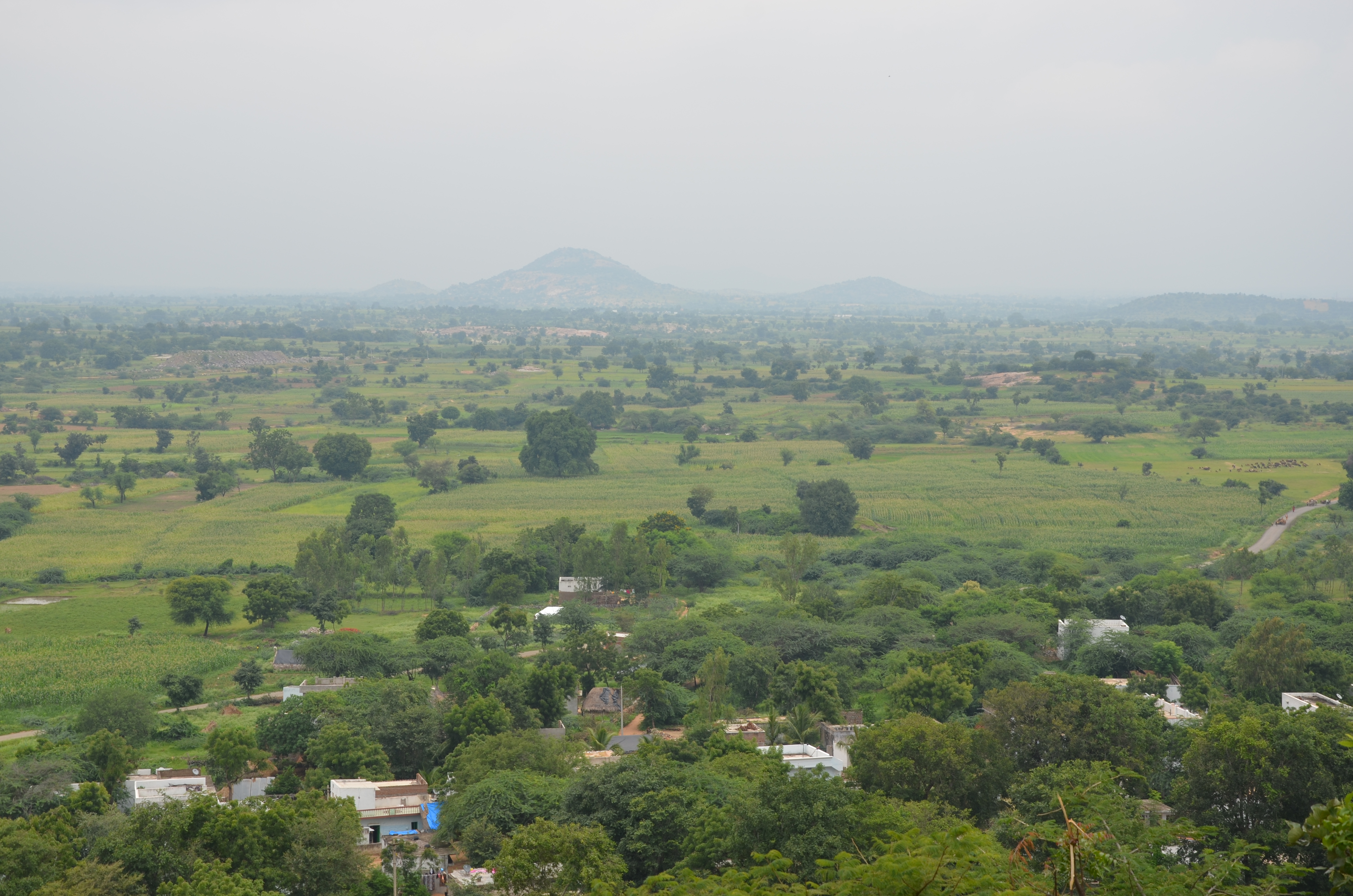
View of Kodair village
