= Kollapur =

- Town
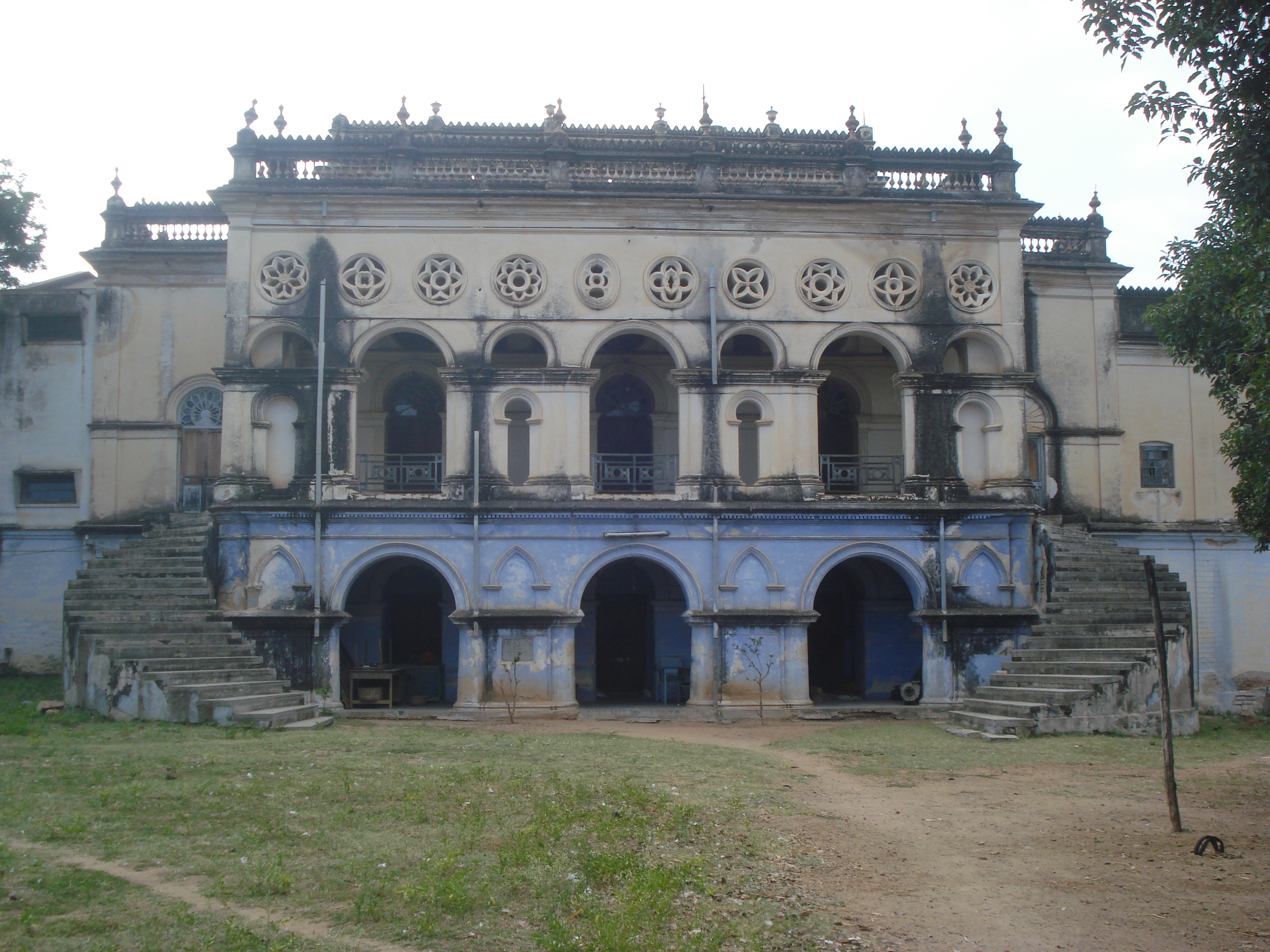
- Kollapur Palace

- Location in Telangana, India Kollapur (India)
- Coordinates: 16°10′59″N 78°20′26″E
- Country: India
- State: Telangana
- District: Nagarkurnool

Population
  - Total: 44,186

Languages
  - Official: Telugu
- Time zone: UTC+5:30 (IST)
- PIN: 509102
- Telephone code: 08501
- Vehicle registration: TS 31
- Nearest city: Hyderabad, Kurnool, Gadwal
- Literacy: 54%
- Lok Sabha constituency: Nagarkurnool
- Vidhan Sabha constituency: Kollapur
- Website: telangana.gov.in

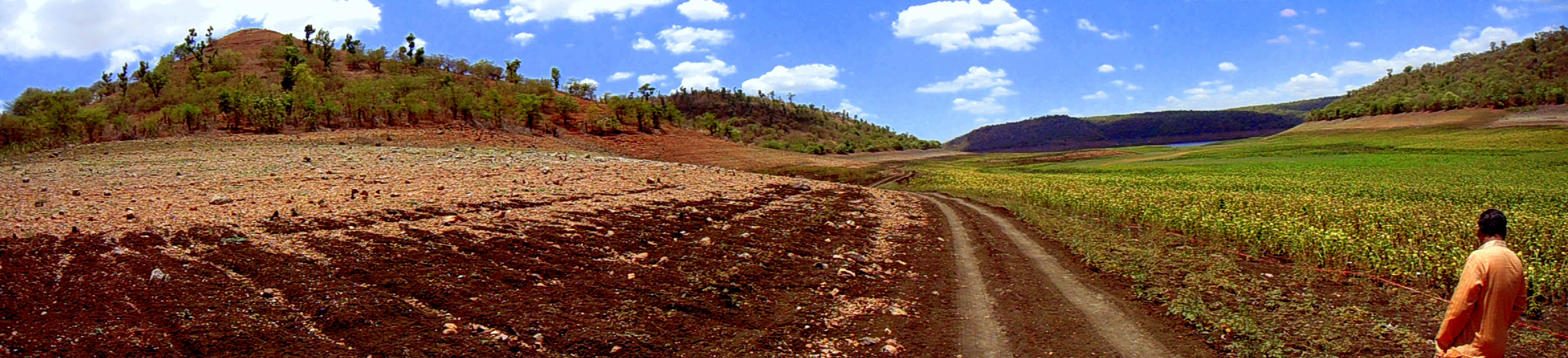
Amaragiri

Kollapur region is an area spanning the Nallamala Forest area on the banks of the river Krishna in the Nagarkurnool district, in the state of Telangana India. The Someswara, Sangameswara, and Malleswara temples are in this region, with traces of architectural treasures from the 2nd century BC. Hundreds of ancient temples are visible in the area, mainly built over 1,500 years ago. Due to similar broad roads and surrounding tree plantations, people used to refer to Kollapur as Telangana Mysore (a reference to the larger city of Mysore).

== Constituency ==
There are five Mandals or governing districts, namely Kodair, Kollapur, Pangal, Peddakothapally, and Veepanagandla. The population of 246,249 is distributed among 116 villages.
