= Basavanagudi inscriptions and hero stones =

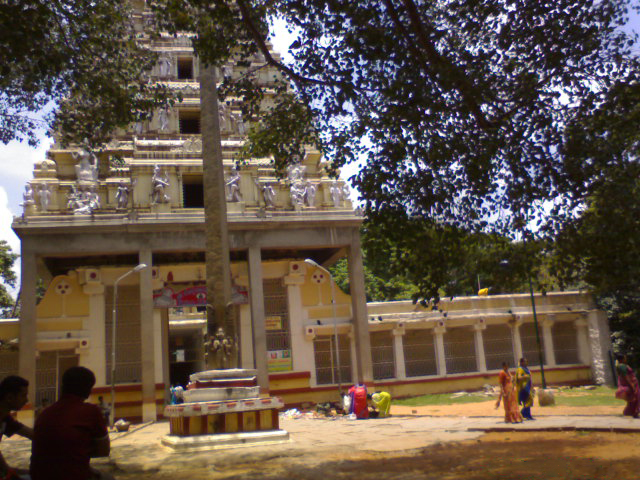
Dodda Basavana Gudi

The Basavanagudi Inscriptions are a set of three Kannada and one Tamil inscriptions that can be found in the locality of Basavanagudi. Of the four, three Kannada inscriptions are physically present and the fourth Tamil inscription's physical status remains unknown. The available Kannada inscriptions can be found in Bugle rock park and Dodda Basavana Gudi or Big bull temple. Two inscriptions found in the vicinity of Dodda Basavana Gudi or Big bull temple, both describe the Vrishabhavati river's origin as coming from the feet of the Basava idol in the temple's sanctum and flowing westwards thereon as Paschimavahini. The two inscriptions can be found: one on the pedestal of the Basava deity in the sanctum and the other on a boulder in the shrubbery surrounding the temple. Two more inscriptions that are published, one is a one line Tamil inscription in Grantha script published in Epigraphia Carnatica and is about possible donatory inscription to the Chokkanathaswamy Temple in Domlur, a locality in Bengaluru, its physical status is not known at present and the other is a one line Kannada inscription in the Kannada script published in Itihasa Darshana Journal and is present on a boulder in the Bugle rock park in Basavanagudi is about one Deevatige Soma .

== Discovery and dating ==
The inscription on the pedestal of the Basava idol was documented in Epigraphia Carnatica, a compendium of Inscriptions in Karnataka by B.L Rice. The second inscription on the boulder is located in the shrubbery surrounding the temple and was documented by Vemagal Somashekar and published in Itihasa Darshana Journal in the year 1996, both inscriptions are dated to c.1600CE on the basis of paleography. The third inscription, a one line Tamil inscription is published in Epigraphia Carnatica is undated. The fourth inscription dated to the 16th century is located on a boulder in Bugle Rock Park was documented by Vemagal Somashekar in 1996 and published in Itihasa Darshana Journal.

== Basavanagudi 1600CE birth of Vrishabhavathi river Peeta inscription ==
Basavanagudi 1600CE Birth of Vrishabhavathi River Peeta Inscription
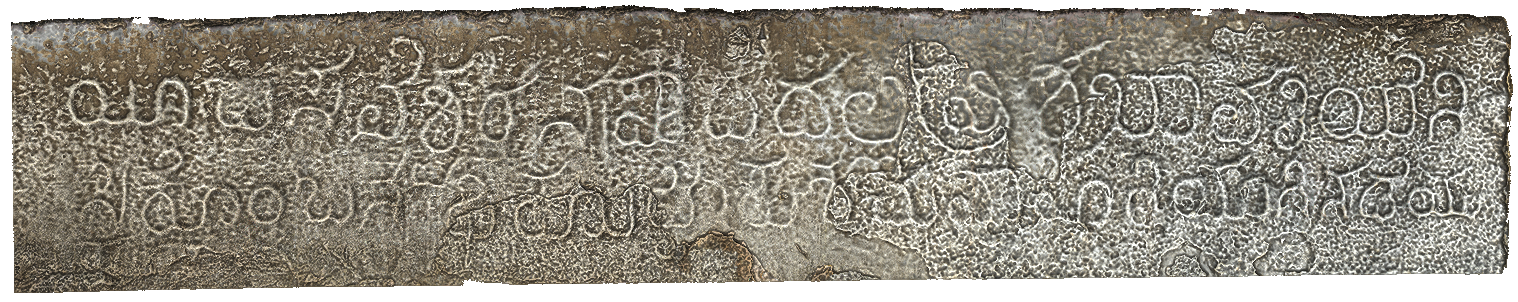
- Digital image of the Basavanagudi 1600CE Birth of Vrishabhavathi River Peeta inscription obtained by 3d scanning of the inscription.
- Material: Stone
- Height: 24 cm (9.4 in)
- Width: 133 cm (52 in)
- Writing: Kannada script of that time.
- Created: 1600 (425 years ago)
- Discovered: 1905
- Discovered by: B L Rice and team of the Mysore Archaeological Department
- Present location: 12.941986°N 77.568273°E
- Language: Kannada language of that time
- https://mythicsociety.github.io/AksharaBhandara/#/learn/Shasanagalu?id=115104

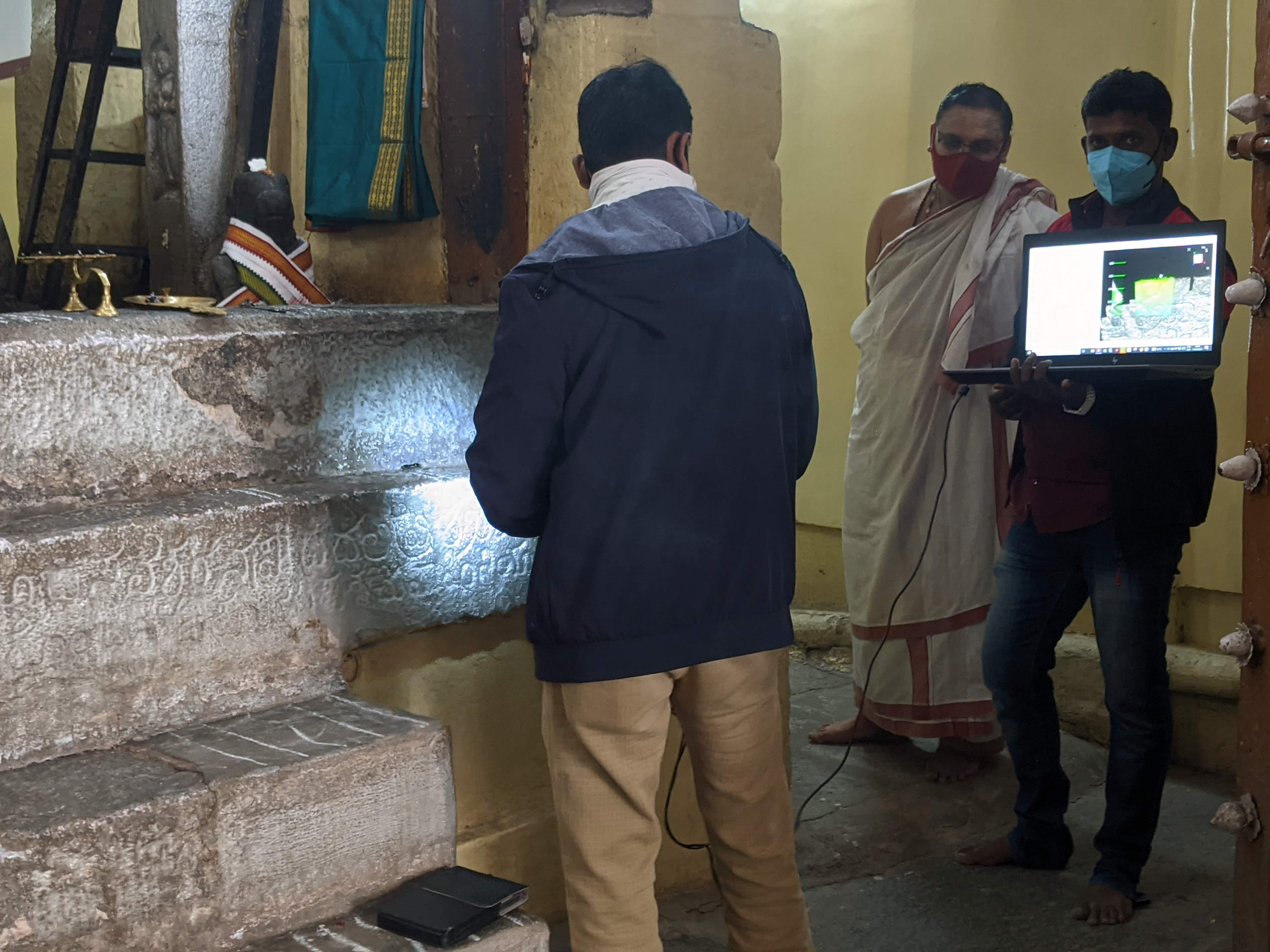
3D Digital Scanning of the Basavanagudi Vrishabhavathi River Peeta Inscription.

The Inscription is on the pedestal/peeta of the Basava idol in the sanctum of the temple, written in the Kannada script and the same language and dated c.1600CE. It records the birth of the river Vrishabhavati as being under the feet of the idol.

=== Physical characteristics ===
The inscription is 24 cm tall and 133 cm wide and the Kannada characters are 6.5 cm tall, 6.2 cm wide & 0.32 cm deep.

=== Transliteration of the inscription in IAST ===
The full reading of the inscription as published in Epigraphia Carnatica.

Digital Images of each of the characters of this inscription, images of the inscription itself, summary and the other information about the inscription have been shared via Akshara Bhandara software

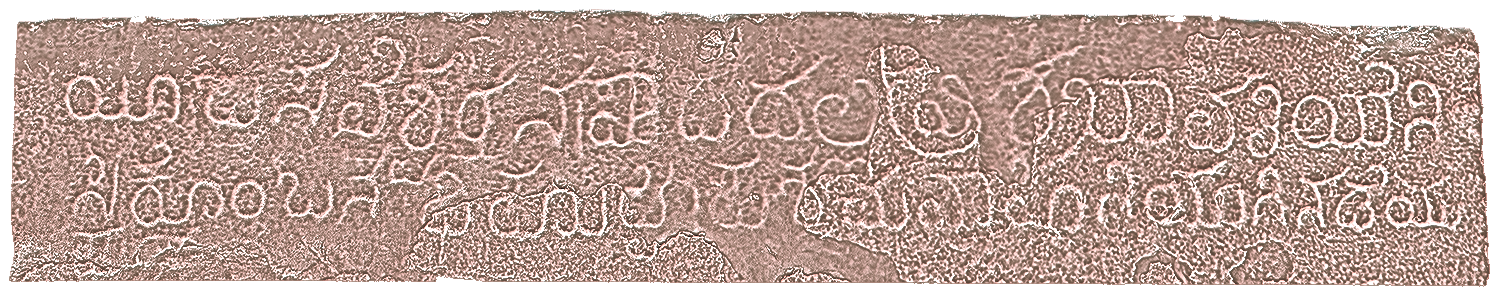
Digital Image of the Basavanagudi 1600CE Birth of Vrishabhavathi River Peeta Inscription.

	Kannada	IAST
1	ಯೀ ಬಸವೇಶ್ವರನ | ಪಾದದಲ್ಲಿ ವ್ರಿಶಭಾವತಿ ಯೆನಿ	yī basaveśvarana | pādadalli vriśabhāvati yĕni
2	ಸಿಕೊಂಬ ನಧಿ ಹುಟ್ಟಿ | ಪಶ್ಚಮವಾಹಿನಿಯಾಗಿ ನಡೆಯು	sikŏṃba nadhi huṭṭi | paścamavāhiniyāgi naḍĕyu
3	ತು | ಶ್ರೀ .	tu | śrī .

=== Translation ===
The inscription is literally translated as,

"At the feet of Basaveshwara, the river Vrishabhavati rose and flows westwards."

== Basavanagudi 1600CE Birth of Vrishabhavathi river boulder inscription ==
Basavanagudi 1600CE Birth of Vrishabhavathi River Boulder Inscription
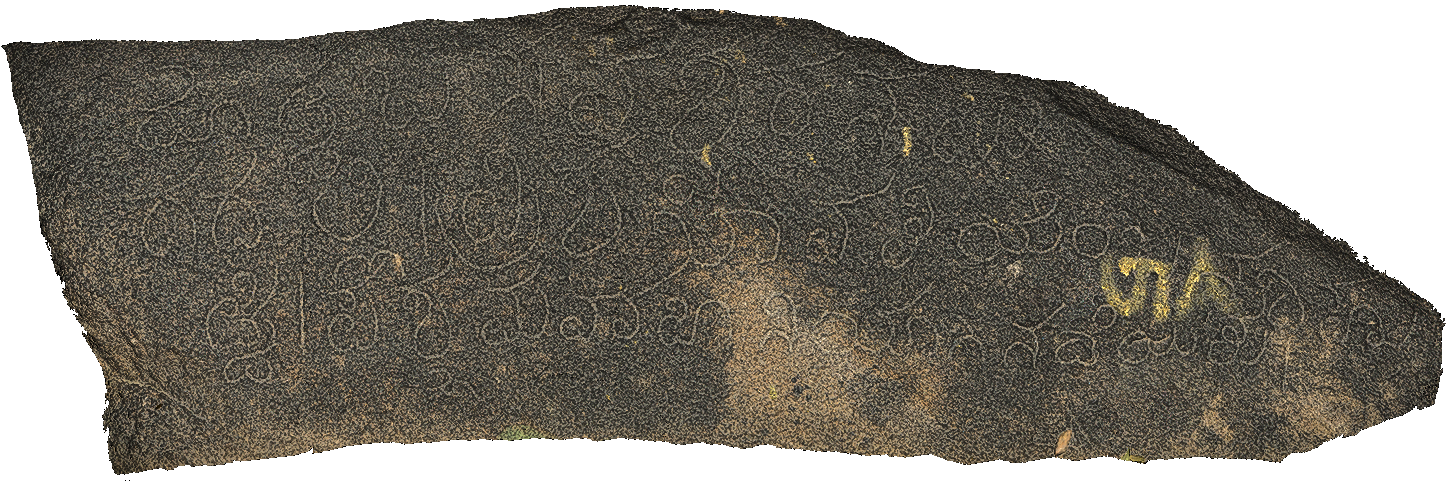
- Digital image of the Basavanagudi 1600CE Birth of Vrishabhavathi River Boulder Inscription obtained by 3d scanning of the inscription
- Material: Stone
- Height: 51 cm (20 in)
- Width: 174 cm (69 in)
- Writing: Kannada script of that time
- Created: 1600 (425 years ago)
- Discovered by: B L Rice and team of the Mysore Archaeological Department
- Present location: 12.942444°N 77.568056°E
- Language: Kannada language of the time
- https://mythicsociety.github.io/AksharaBhandara/#/learn/Shasanagalu?id=115106

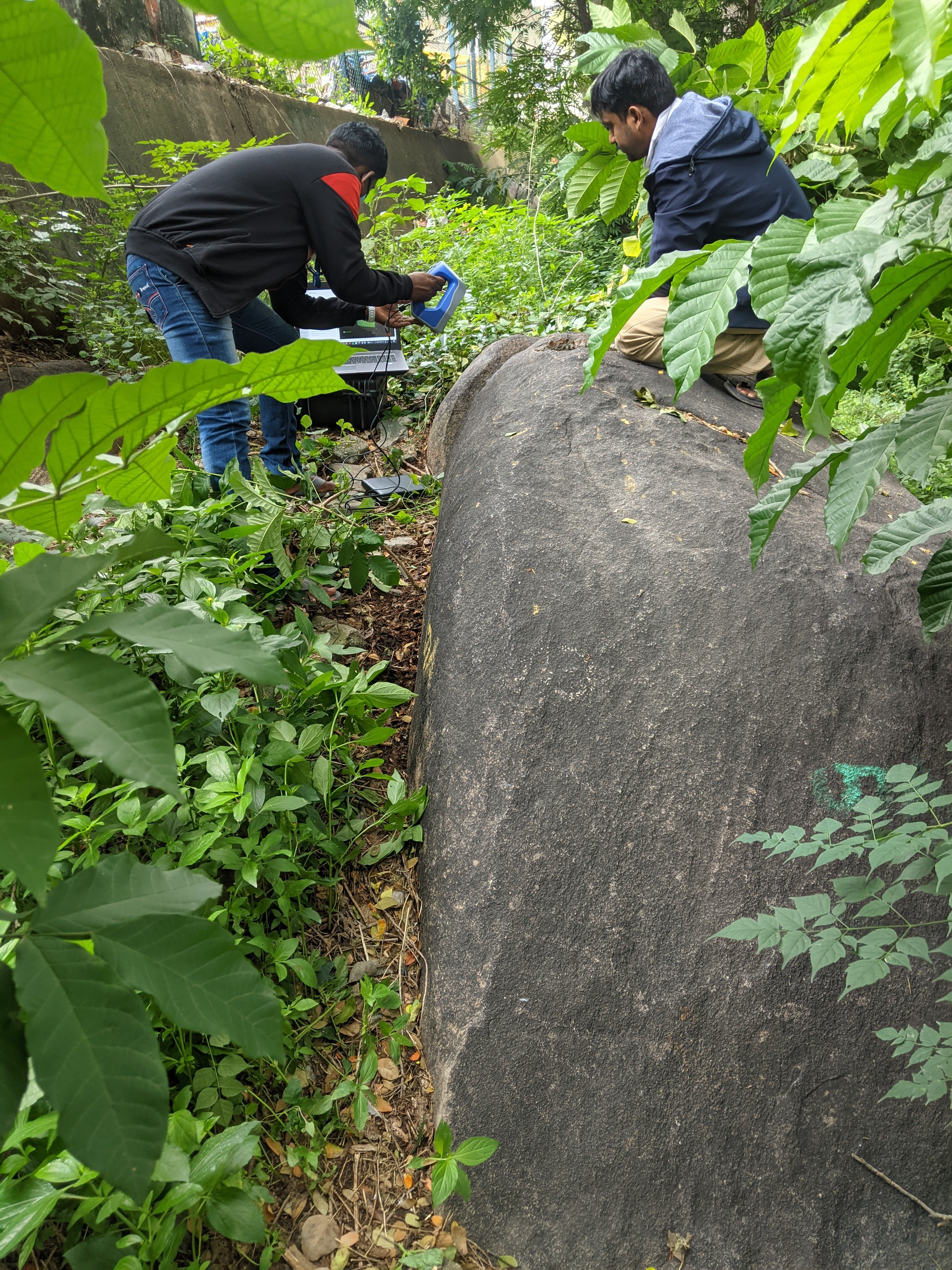
3D Digital Scanning of the Basavanagudi Vrishabhavathi River Boulder Inscription.

The inscription is found on the boulder in the vicinity of the temple, written in the Kannada script and language, dated to the c.1600CE.

=== Physical characteristics ===
The inscription is 51 cm tall and 174 cm in width, the characters inscribed are 11.5 cm tall, 10.2 cm wide & 0.29 cm deep.

=== Transliteration of the inscription in IAST ===
The inscription as published in Itihasa Darshana Journal by Vemagal Somashekhar. A rereading of the same has also been published by S Karthik in Karnataka Lochana Journal.

Digital Images of each of the characters of this inscription, images of the inscription itself, summary and the other information about the inscription have been shared via Akshara Bhandara software

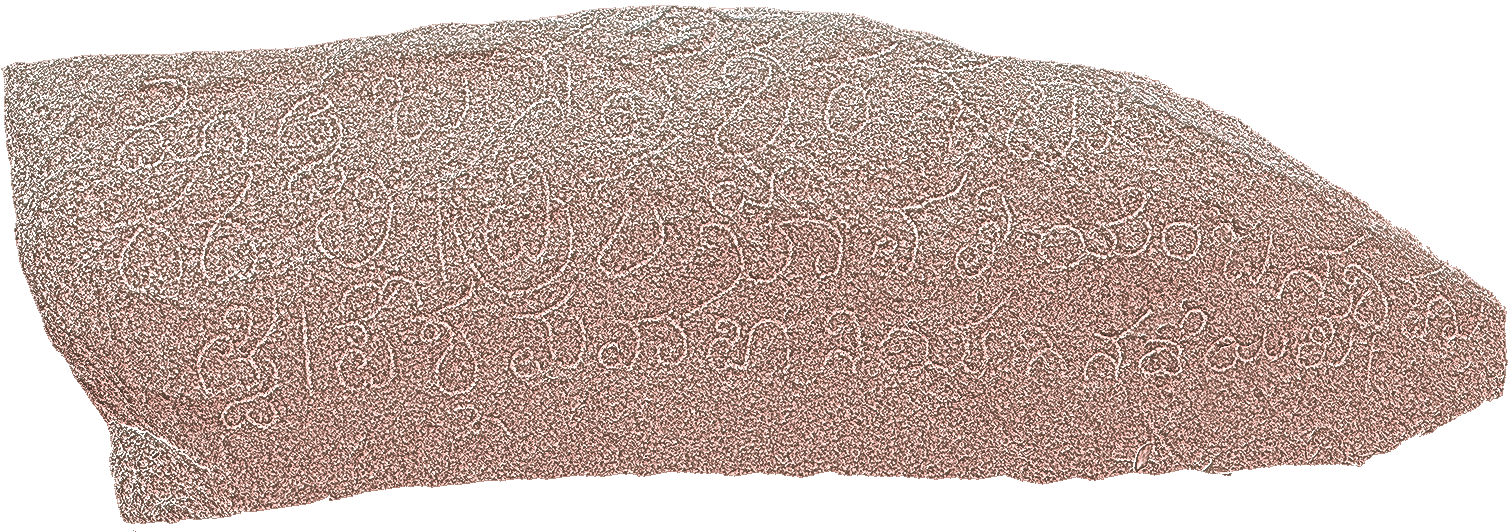
Digital Image of the Basavanagudi Vrishabhavathi River Boulder Inscription.

	Kannada	IAST
1	ದೊಡ್ಡ ಬಸವೇಶ್ವರನ ಪಾ	dŏḍḍa basaveśvarana pā
2	ದದಲ್ಲಿ | ವ್ರಿಶಭಾವತಿಯೆಂಬ ನದಿ ಹು	dadalli | vriśabhāvatiyĕṃba nadi hu
3	ಟ್ಟಿ | ಪಶ್ಚಮ ವಾಹಿನಿಯಾಗಿ ನಡೆಯಿತು |	ṭṭi | paścama vāhiniyāgi naḍĕyitu |

=== Translation ===
The inscription is literally translated as,

"At the feet of Dodda Basaveshwara, the river vrushbhavati rose and flows westwards."

=== Sunkenahalli Undated Domlur Chokkanathaswamy donation inscription ===
The inscription is documented in the Epigraphia Carnatica, mention sunkenhalli in the Basavanagudi locality and is a one line inscription in Tamil Language and the Grantha script and a possible donatory inscription to the Chokkanathaswamy temple in Domlur and is undated, its present physical status is not known.

==== Transliteration of the inscription in modern IAST ====
1. Tombaluril S'okkapperumalukku ivar.....

==== Translation ====
The translation is read as,

"In domlur, to chokkaperumal...."

=== Basavanagudi 16th century Dīvaṭige Soma inscription ===
The bugle rock park as it is presently known is also called as Kahale Bande, according to folklore it was said to be the place from where Kempegowda's military would sound the war trumpet from the boulders of the place, Kahale in Kannada is a musical instrument like the trumpet and Bande meaning boulder, hence its name. The inscription is located on one of the boulders and is inscribed facing the east, it is a one line Kannada inscription about one Deevatige Soma and is dated to the 16th century CE paleographically.

==== Transliteration of the Inscription in modern IAST ====
1. Dīvaṭige sōmanu....kula guruliṅga

==== Transliteration of the inscription in modern Kannada ====
1. ದೀವಟಿಗೆ ಸೋಮನು....ಕುಲ ಗುರುಲಿಂಗ
