= Bugle Rock =

- neighbourhood
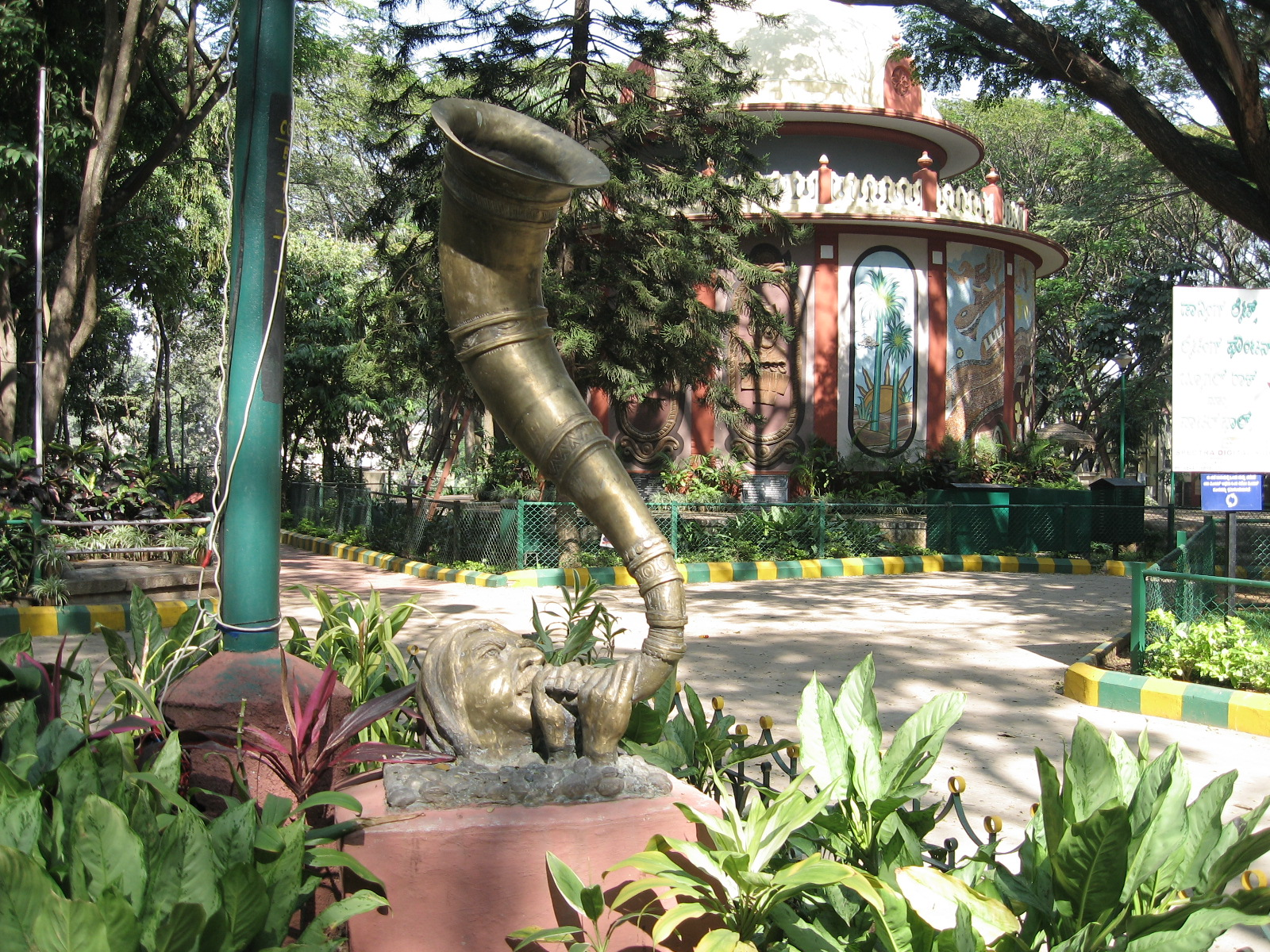
- A soldier with bugle at the Bugle rock

- Location in Bengaluru, India
- Coordinates: 12.94303°N 77.56947°E
- Country: India
- State: Karnataka
- District: Bengaluru Urban
- Metro: Bengaluru

Languages
  - Official: Kannada
- Time zone: UTC+5:30 (IST)

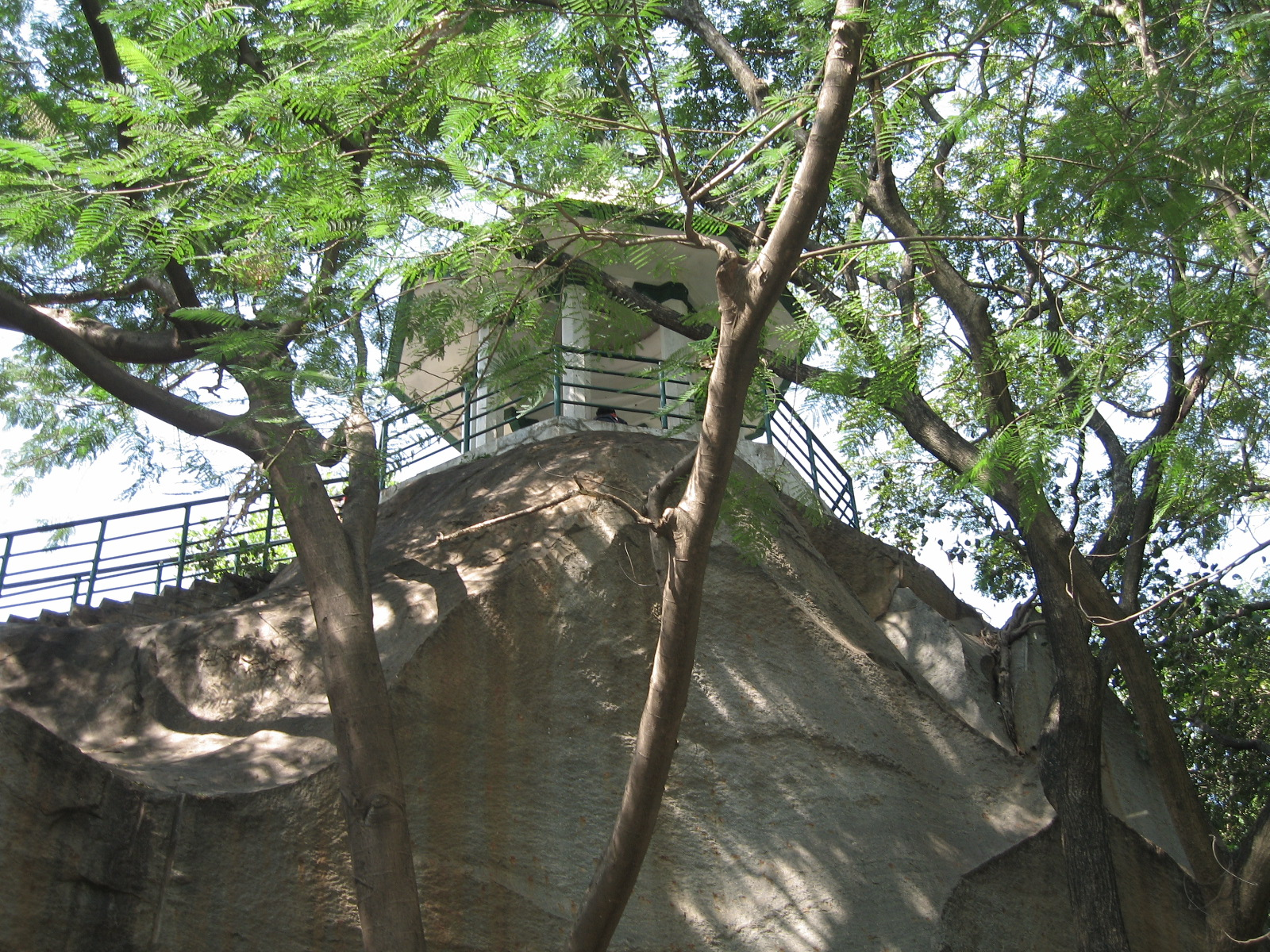
The watch tower on the Bugle rock built by Kempegowda II

Bugle Rock (Kahale Bande) is a massive rock in the Basavanagudi area of South Bengaluru, in the state of Karnataka. It is an abrupt rise above the ground of peninsular gneiss as the main rock formation and with an assessed age of about 3,000 million years. Bugle Rock has generated wide interest in the scientific community.

Kempe Gowda II (who came to power in 1585), the feudal ruler of Bangalore, is credited with building four watchtowers setting limits for Bangalore's expansion, which included a tower on the Bugle Rock (on the southern boundary) as it commands a panoramic view of Bangalore city. It is said that at sunset a sentry would blow the bugle and hold a torch which was visible from the other three watch towers (one on the southern bank of the Kempambudi tank on the west, the second near Ulsoor Lake in the east and the third tower adjoining Ramana Maharshi Ashram on Bellary Road, Mekhri Circle in the north). This was to inform people that everything was safe at that location and to give a warning bugle call to alert the citizens of any intruders into the city. Most of the rocks on the Bugle Rock, next to the Bull Temple, have hollows, which were once used to light lamps. This landmark spreads over an area of 16 acres (6.5 ha). This rock is contiguous and similar to the rock at Lalbagh tower.

== Geological age of rock ==
South India is endowed with one of the oldest land formations on earth, namely the Gondwanas of Archaean age. The massive rock exposure at Lal Bagh, which is adjacent to the Bugle Rock exposure, was first examined in 1916 by Dr. W.F. Smeeth of the then-Mysore Geological Department who classified this rock as "peninsular gneiss." The antiquity of the rock formation has generated innumerable scientific papers from geologists of the then Mysore Geological Department, the Geological Survey of India (GSI) and the scholars from related academies and institutions abroad. The scientific study of GSI infers:

The Lalbagh hill is composed of dark biolite gneiss of granitic to granodioritic composition containing streaks of biolite. Vestiges of older rocks are seen in the form of enclaves within the gneiss. Peninsular Gneiss of the region is dated 2500 to 3400 million years that accreted in three major episodes, i.e. 3.4 Ga, 3.3–3.2 Ga and 3.0–2.9 Ga. The quarries of Lalbagh are of great importance for researches on earth sciences towards evolution of the terrain.

The Geological Survey of India has listed this site, one of the 26 such sites in the country, as "Geological Monuments of India" and has displayed a commemorative plaque in front of the rock tower which states:

Geological Survey of India: National Geological Monument: This monument is over a typical exposure of peninsular gneiss, a geological term for complex mixture of granitic rocks extensively developed in peninsular India. The term was coined by Dr. W.F. Smeeth of Mysore Geological Department in 1916. The peninsular gneiss is among the oldest rocks of the earth with an age, 2.5 to 3.4 billion years. The antiquity of these rocks has attracted geologists all over the world and has given rise to erudite scientific papers on the evolution of the earth by the pioneers of the Mysore Geological Department, Geological Survey of India and scholars from the academy. Stone quarry of this gneiss still continues to be an endless source material for research in the various branches of earth science.

== The park ==
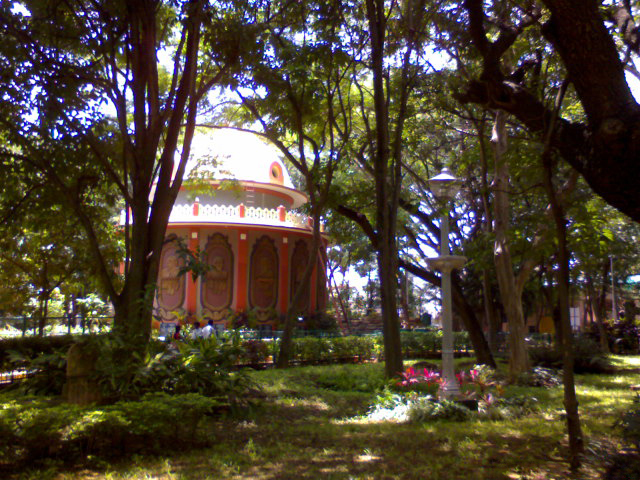
A view of the Bugle Rock garden

Amidst the natural rock formations, a small park with waterfalls and fountains has been developed as one of the green lungs of the garden city of Bangalore, which is frequented visited by children, families and the elderly. The park houses three temples. The densely tree-lined park developed by the Horticulture Department of the Government of Karnataka is considered a "walkers paradise" since over 750 to 1000 visitors (70% of them senior citizens) visit the park every day. One can also hear calls of a number of bats perched on the trees. An amphitheatre, which can accommodate 300 people, has been developed in the precincts of the park. The Hindu temple Dodda Basavana Gudi or Bull Temple, said to be the biggest temple to Nandi (the bull referred to as a sacred Hindu demi-god) in the world, and a Ganesha temple are in the limits of the park. According to an inscription in the Bull Temple, a spring beneath the Nandi is the source of the Vrishabhavathi River, which flows to the west of Bangalore.

During the Third Mysore War, a contingent of the Mysore army, regrouped in this rock area under the leadership of Mir Khammar-ud-din before attacking the British Army.

== Honour to distinguished people ==
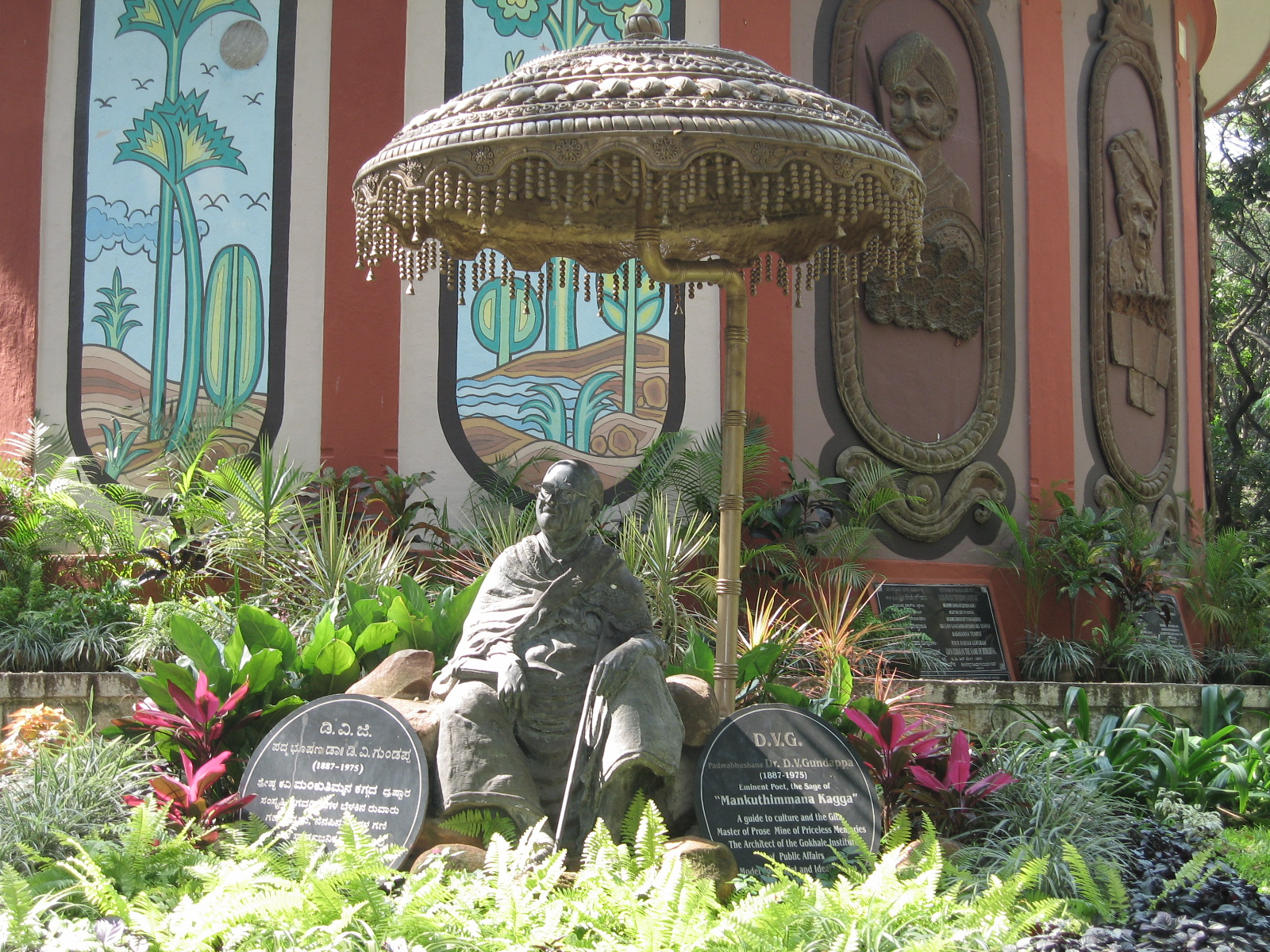
Statue of D V Gundappa at Bugle Rock Gardens. Kempe Gowda founder of Bengaluru city and Bharat Ratna Sir Mokshagundam Visvesvarayya are seen behind on the Murals of the old tank wall

The outer wall of an old water tank in the confines of the Bugle Rock park has murals of famous people of Bengaluru and Karnataka: Kempe Gowda I (1513–1569), the ruler of Bangalore and Bharat Ratna Sir Mokshagundam Visvesvarayya (1860–1962), the engineer statesman and the builder of modern Karnataka, behind the statue of D V Gundappa, (1887–1975) popularly known as DVG, the Kannada litterateur, philosopher erected in 2002–03 to honour him. It is said that Bugle Rock was the place where D.V. Gundappa used to meet Masti Venkatesh Iyengar, journalist P.R. Ramaiya (of Tainadu newspaper fame, one of the founders of Kannada journalism and the first MLA from the area after independence), artist A.N. Subbarao (founder of Kalamandira which used to be in Gandhi Bazar), lawyers M.P. Somashekhara Rao and Nittoor Srinivasa Rau (who later became the Chief Justice of Karnataka High Court) and several other noted people like Prof. V.T. Srinivasan, founder and principal of Vijaya College, Bangalore.

The park has been named in honour of T.R. Shamanna, a humanitarian and local politician. It has been spruced up with landscaping with rocky steps. An impressive entrance has been sculpted with rock pillars and by adding murals on the unused outer wall of the water tank with engravings of the faces of eminent people.

== Fruit bats ==
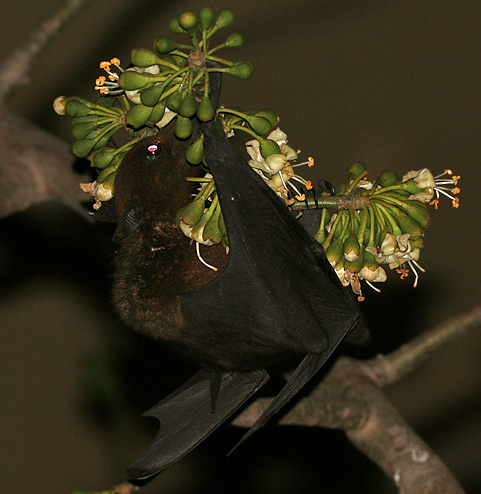
Indian Flying-fox feeding on Kapok (Ceiba pentandra)

In the Bugle Rock park, in a study carried out by bat biologists, Indian Flying-foxes (the fruit bat (Pteropus giganteus), listed as least-threatened in the 2006 IUCN Red List of Threatened Species Chiroptera Specialist Group 1996) have been recorded in roost trees (Ficus sp., Mangifera indica (mango tree), Samanea saman (rain tree), Eucalyptus sp., Glaycindia sp.), and also in Gulmohar (Delonix regia) and jackfruit trees (Artocarpus heterophyllus) in the garden, tree groups and protected areas with a roost size of 650–710. The roost trees, about 20–25 and generally 30–40 feet (9.1–12.2 m) tall, are in the central area of the park and are 50–60 years old. The area is maintained by the Bangalore Development Authority (BDA). The farmland, before roost, is stated to be undisturbed and ancient. The study has observed that there is need to conserve urban roosts of bats. It is recorded that the Police Commissionerate on Infantry Road, Bangalore has geared to preserve bats, which have nested in the trees in the Commiserate for many years.

== Transportation ==
City bus routes: 36, 43, 45 from Majestic/Market, 3 from Jayanagar, 34, 37 from Shivajinagar, T-12 from Yeshvantapur RMC.

== Pictures ==
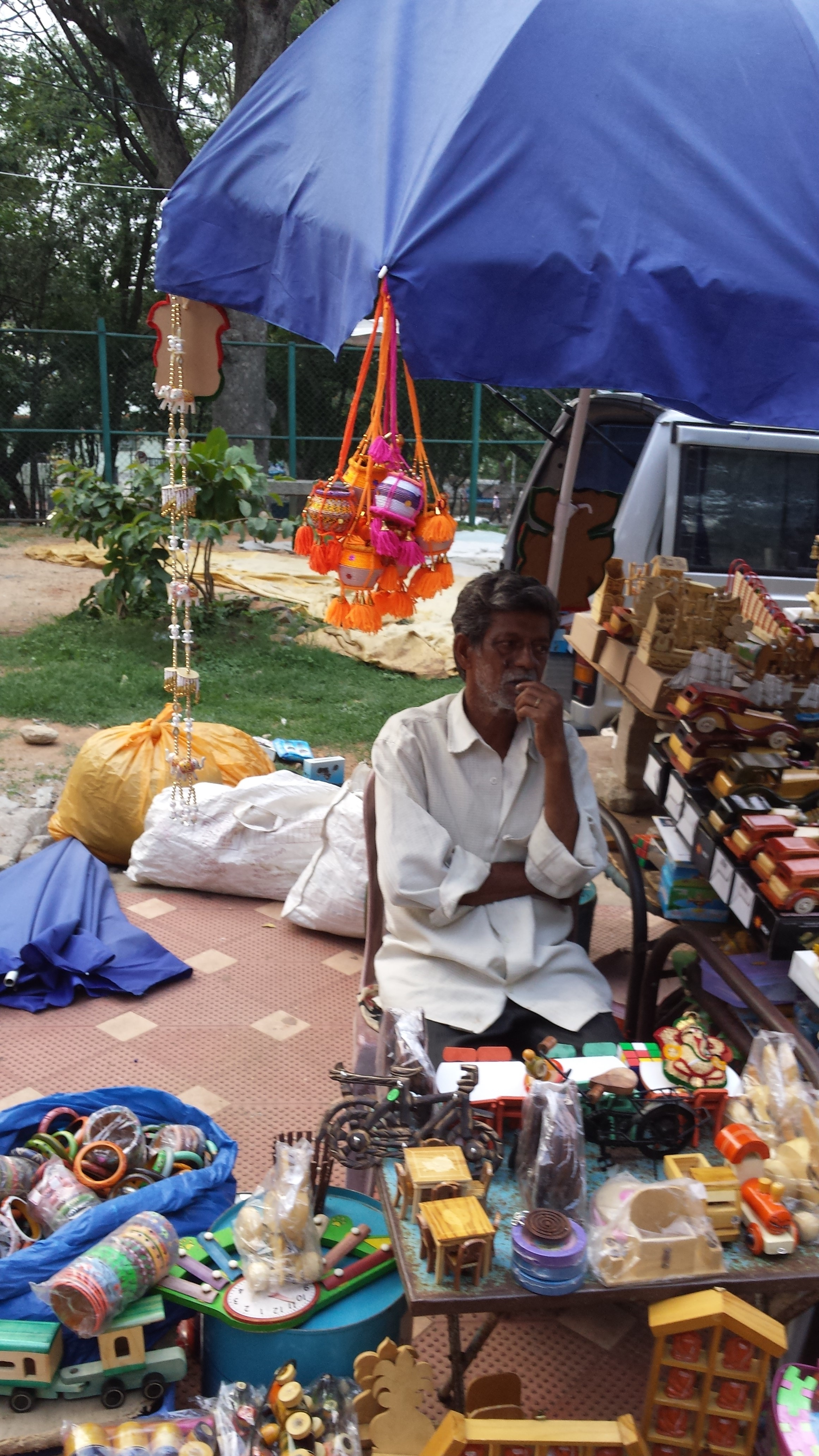
Toy Vendor in front of Basavanagudi inside Bugle Rock park

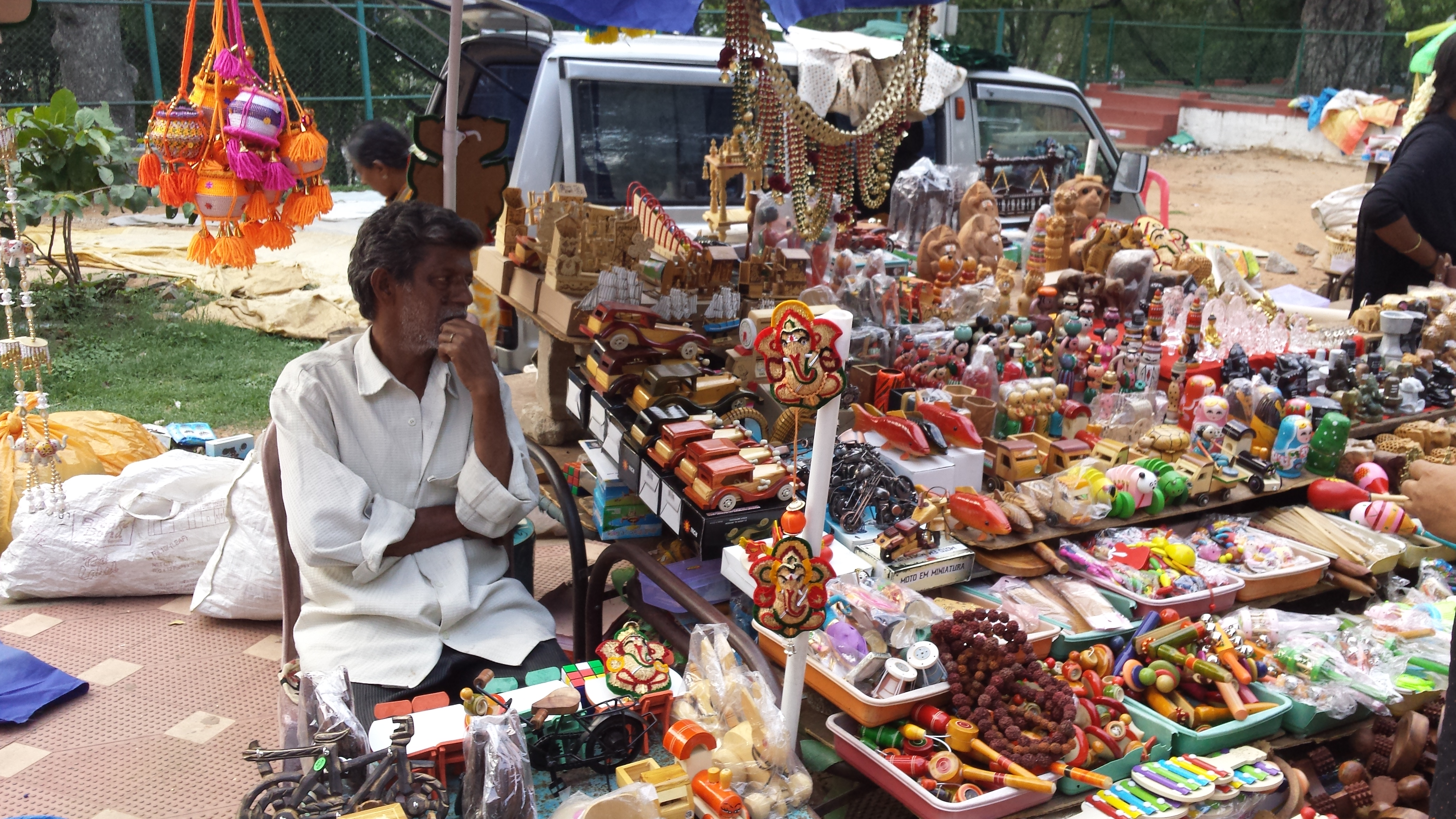
A toy vendor selling traditional toys in front of the Big Bull Temple inside Bugle Rock park

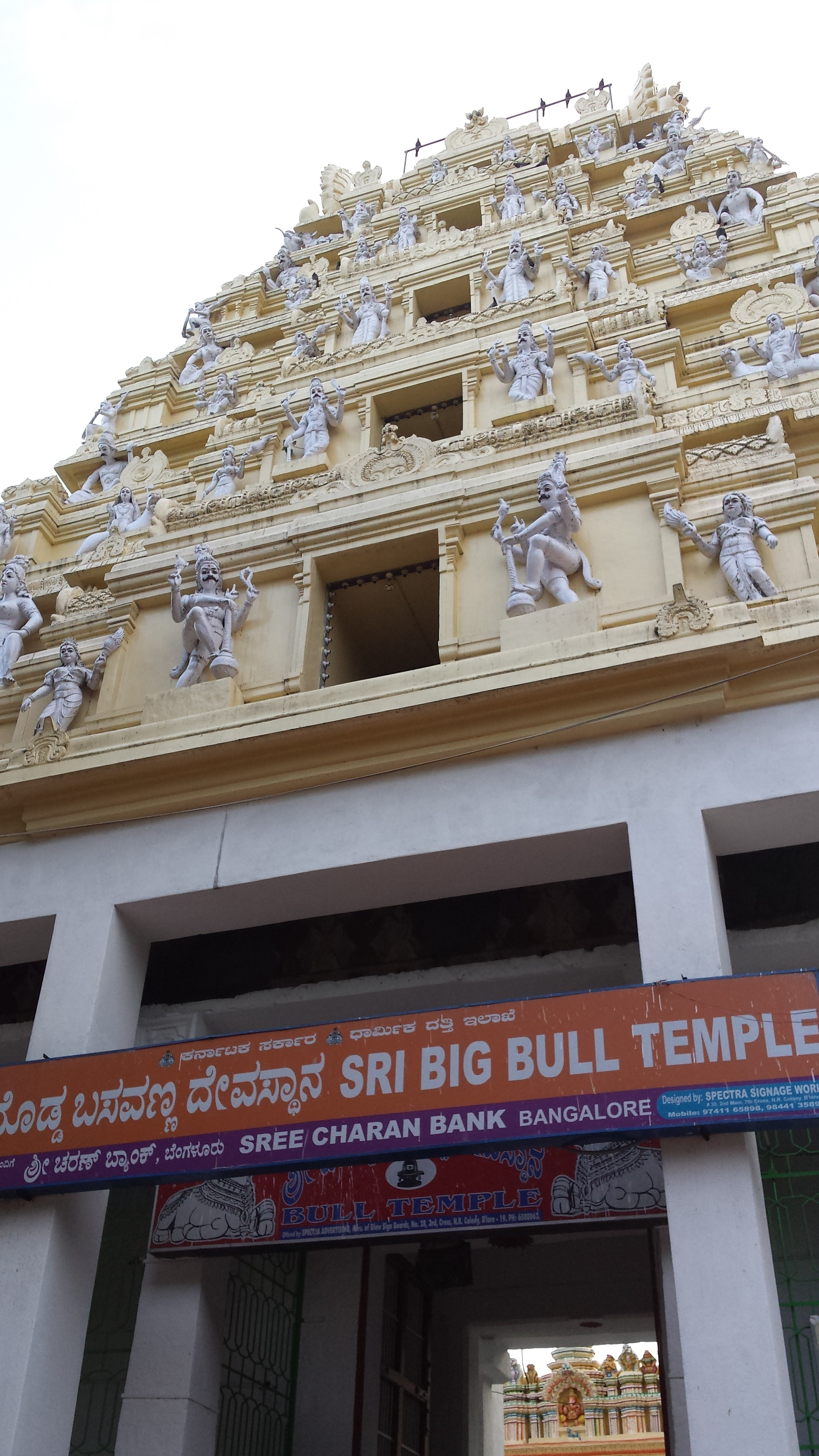
Entrance to the 16th century Big Bull Temple inside Bugle Rock park

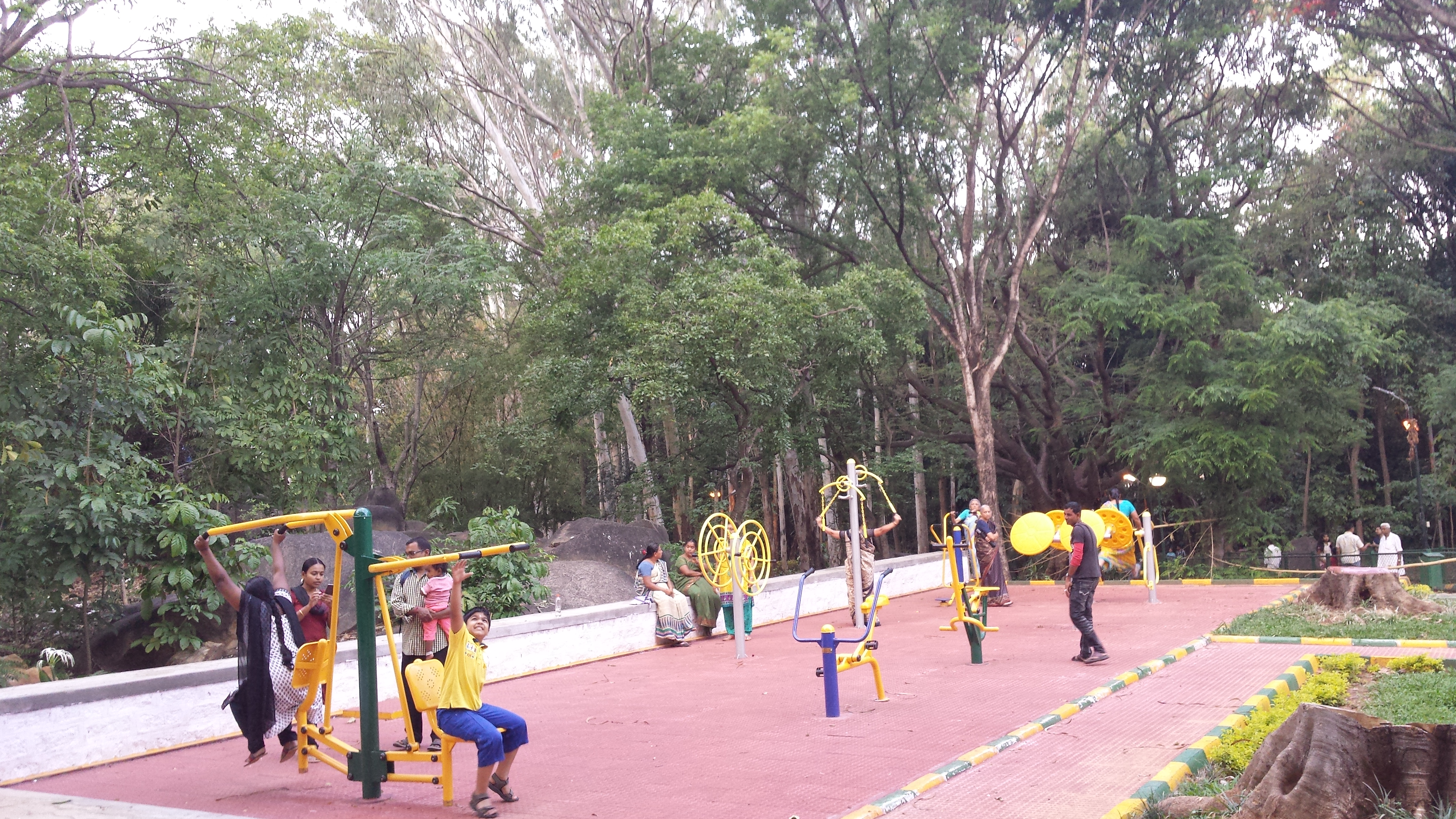
An open gym for use by the general public inside Bugle Rock park

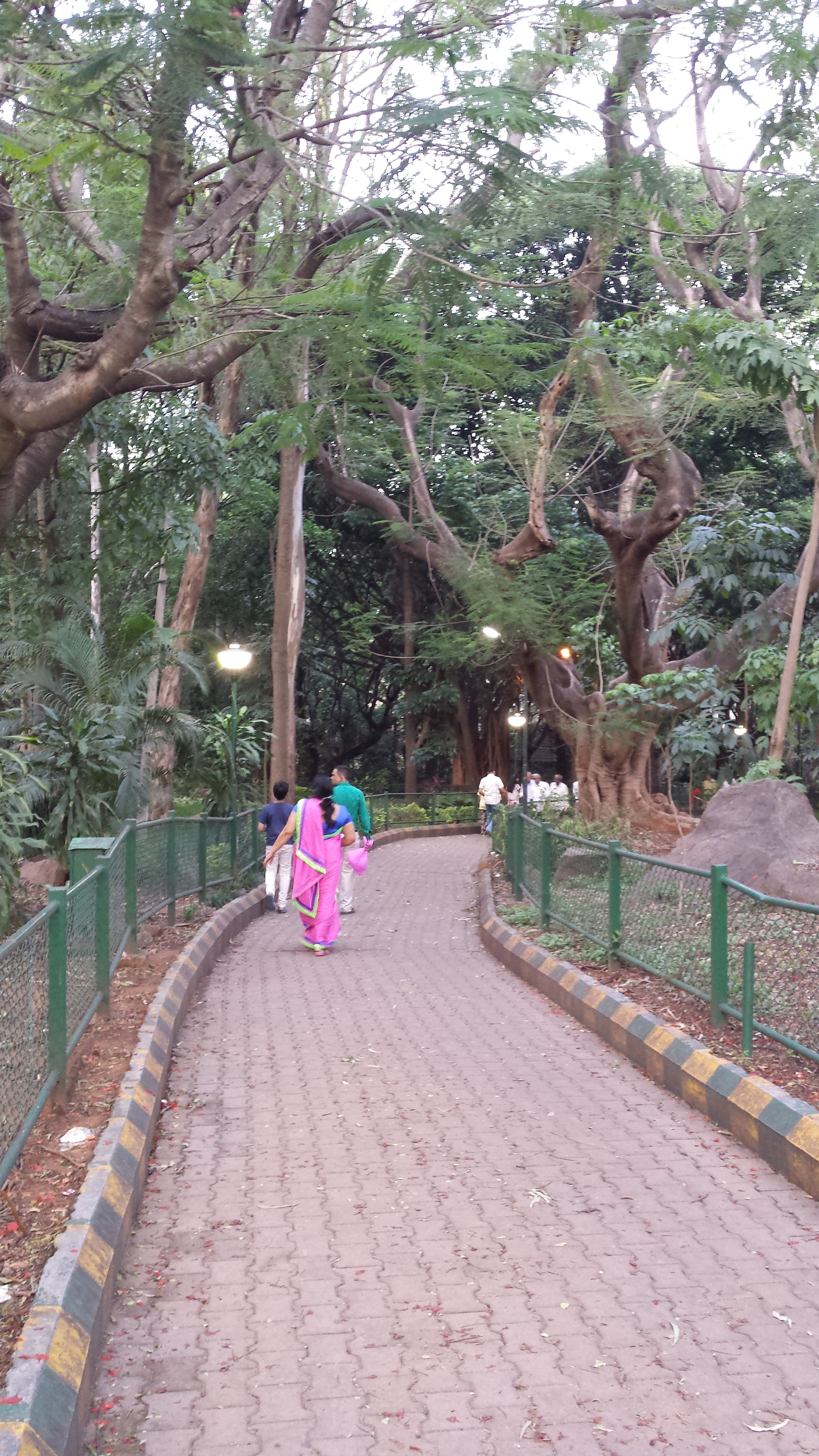
A pathway inside Bugle Rock park

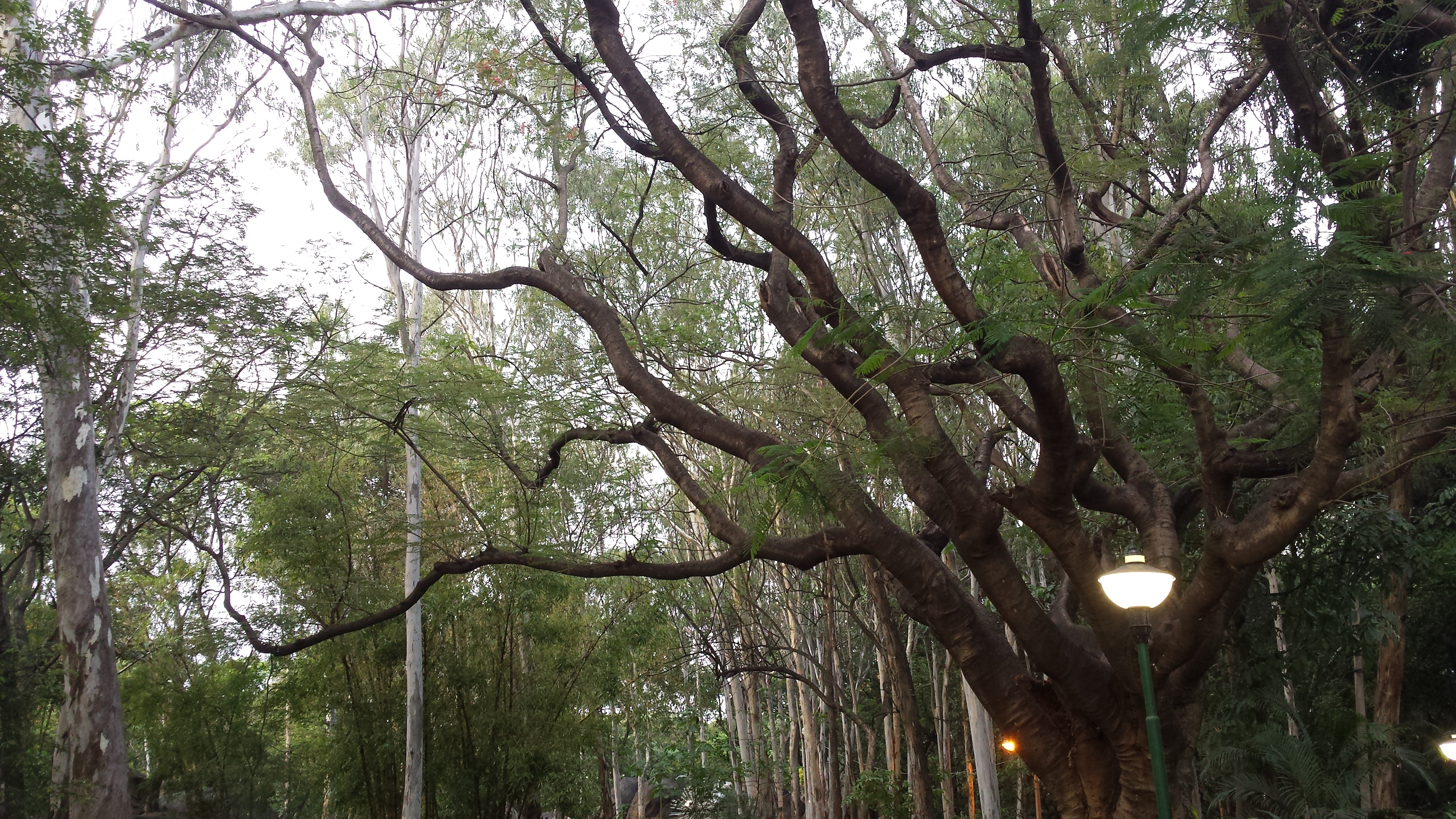
Some of the trees lining the pathways inside Bugle Rock park

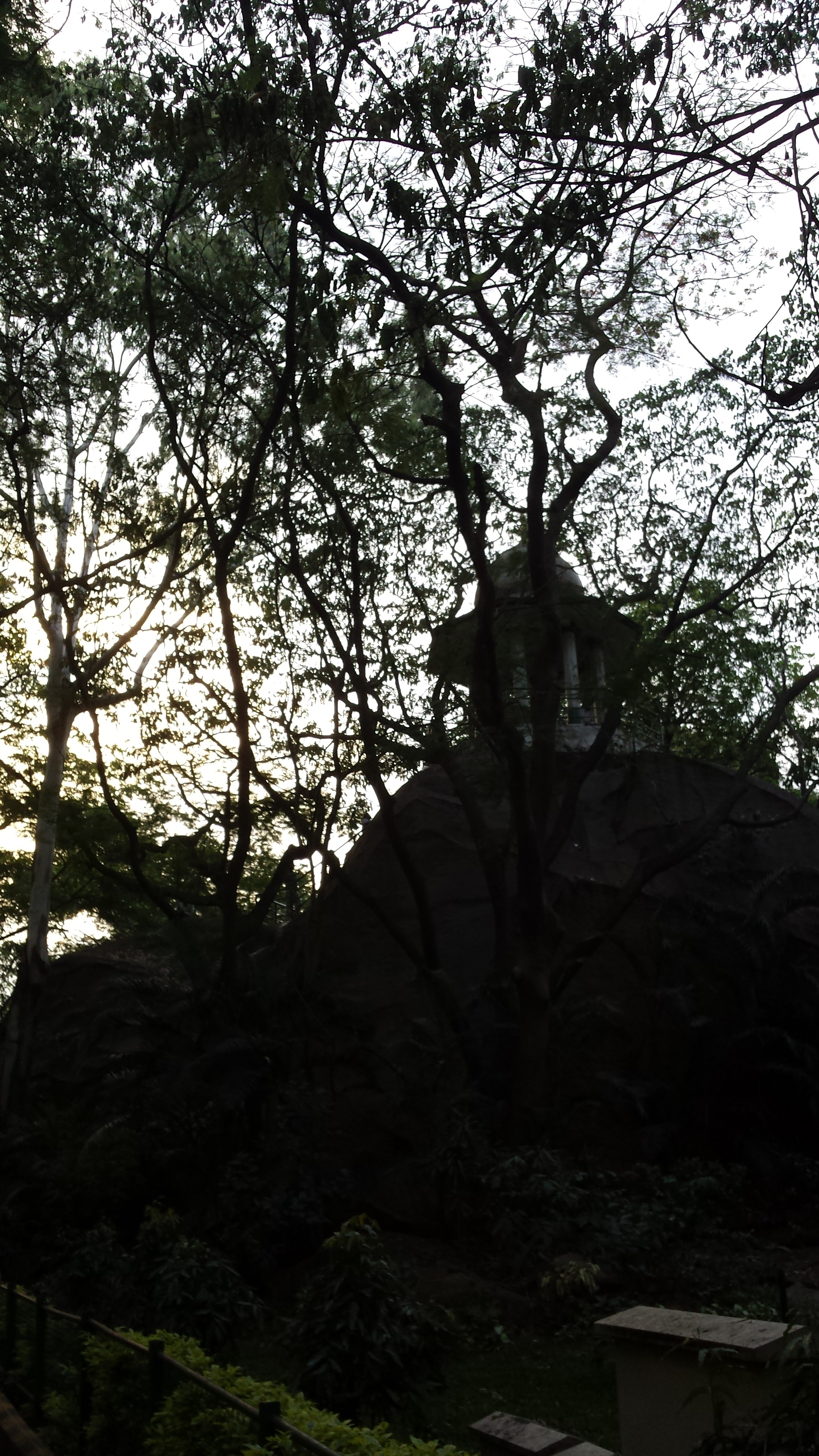
An evening view of the Watch Tower inside Bugle Rock park
