= Dodda Basavana Gudi =

Temple in Bengaluru, India

Coordinates: 12°56′34.42″N 77°34′5.55″E

- ದೊಡ್ಡ ಬಸವನ ಗುಡಿ
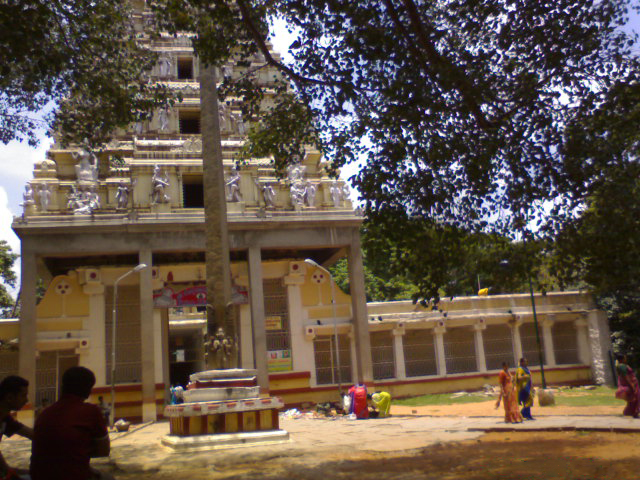
- View of the Bull temple

Religion
- Affiliation: Hinduism
- District: Bengaluru Urban
- Deity: Basava

Location
- Location: Bengaluru
- State: Karnataka
- Country: India
- Interactive map of Dodda Basavana Gudi

Architecture
- Type: Vijayanagara

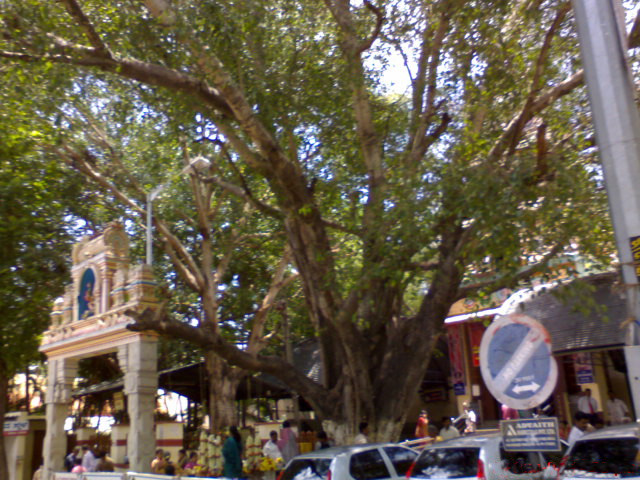
Entrance to the Ganesha temple

Dodda Basavana Gudi (the Nandhi Temple) is situated in Bull Temple Road, Basavanagudi, area of South Bengaluru, part of the largest city of the Indian state of Karnataka. The Hindu temple is inside a park called Bugle Rock.

The bull referred to is a sacred Hindu demi-god, known as Nandi; Nandi is a close devotee and attendant of Shiva. Dodda Basavana Gudi is said to be one of the biggest temple to Nandi in the world. The stone monolith idol of Nandi is continually covered with new layers of butter, benne in the local language of Kannada. There is an idol of the elephant-headed Hindu deity Ganesha close by.

Every year on the last Monday and Tuesday of the Hindu month of Karthika Maasa a groundnut fair is held in the temple premises and groundnut is offered to the deity. This fair is known as 'Kadalekaayi Parishe' in local tongue. Groundnut sellers and devotees throng the place during Kadalekaayi Parishe.

Basavana Gudi is a regular place of visit for tourists and is covered by most of the tour operators including the Karnataka State Tourism Development Corporation.

== The Bull Temple ==
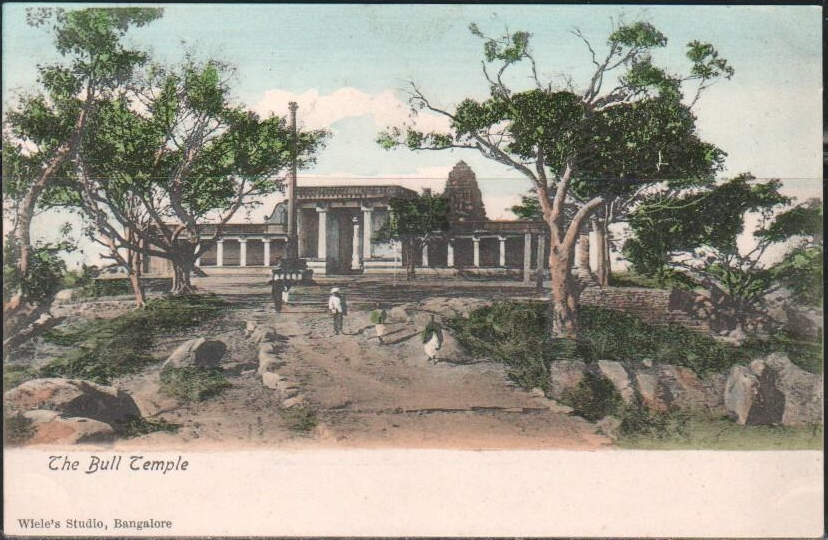
Bull Temple, Bengaluru - Wiele's Studio

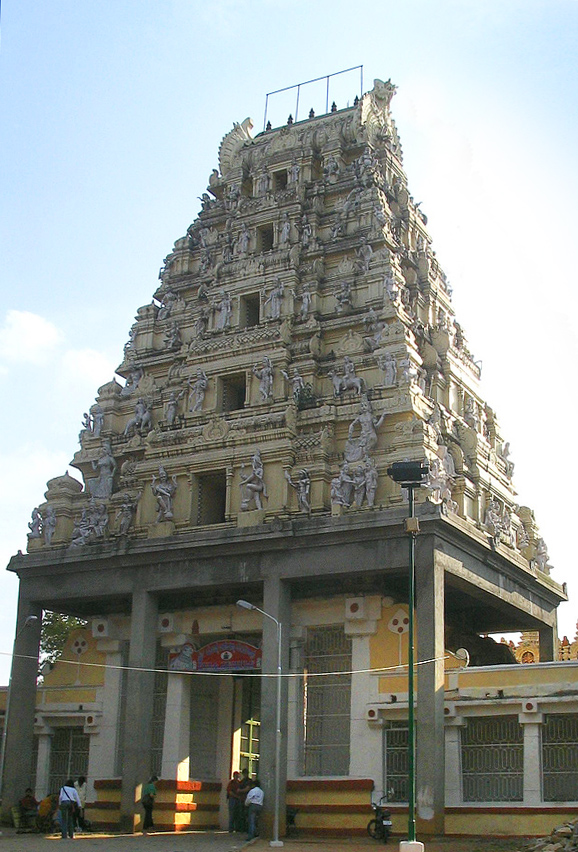
The temple entrance

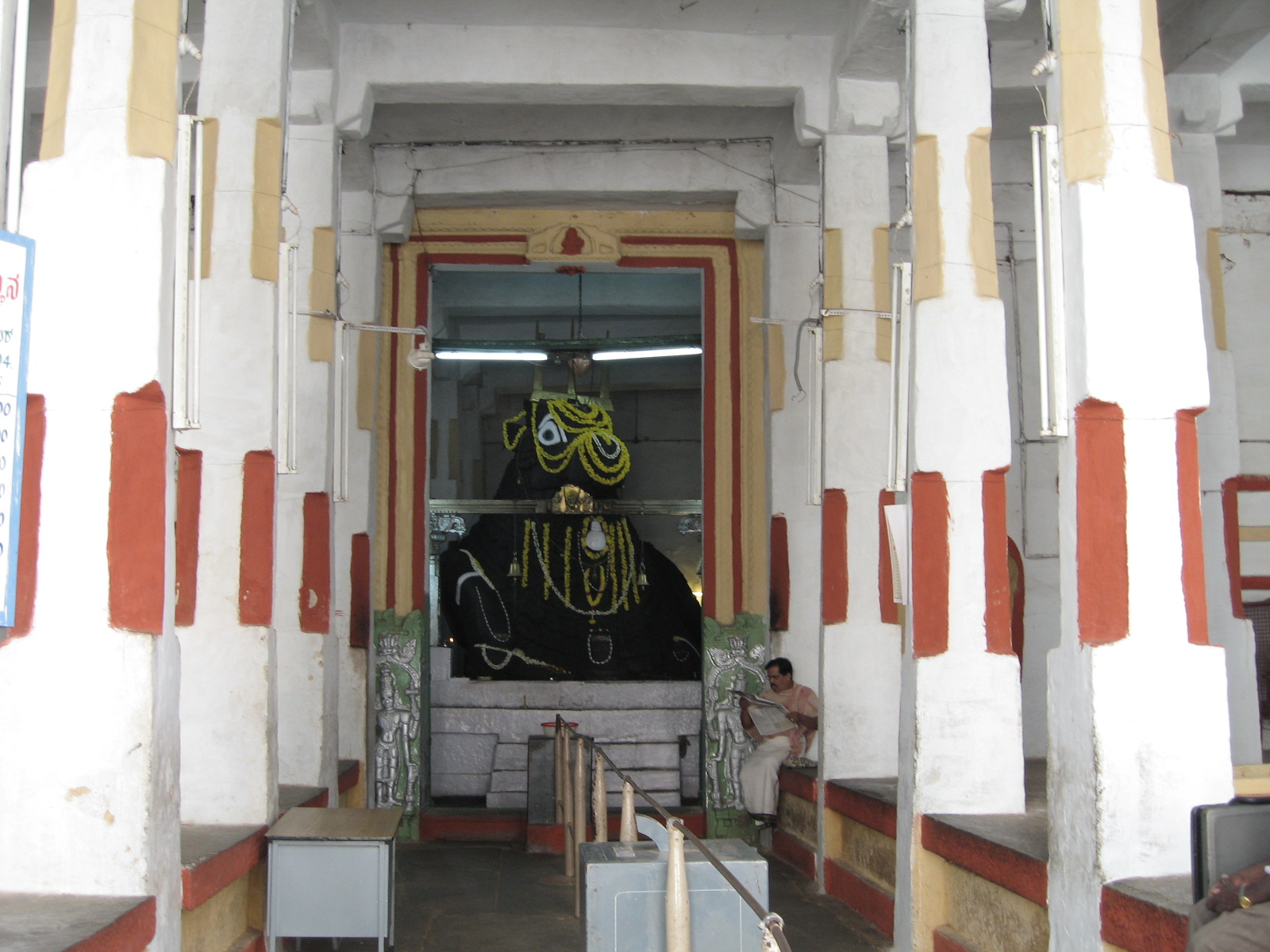
Temple interior with Nandi idol

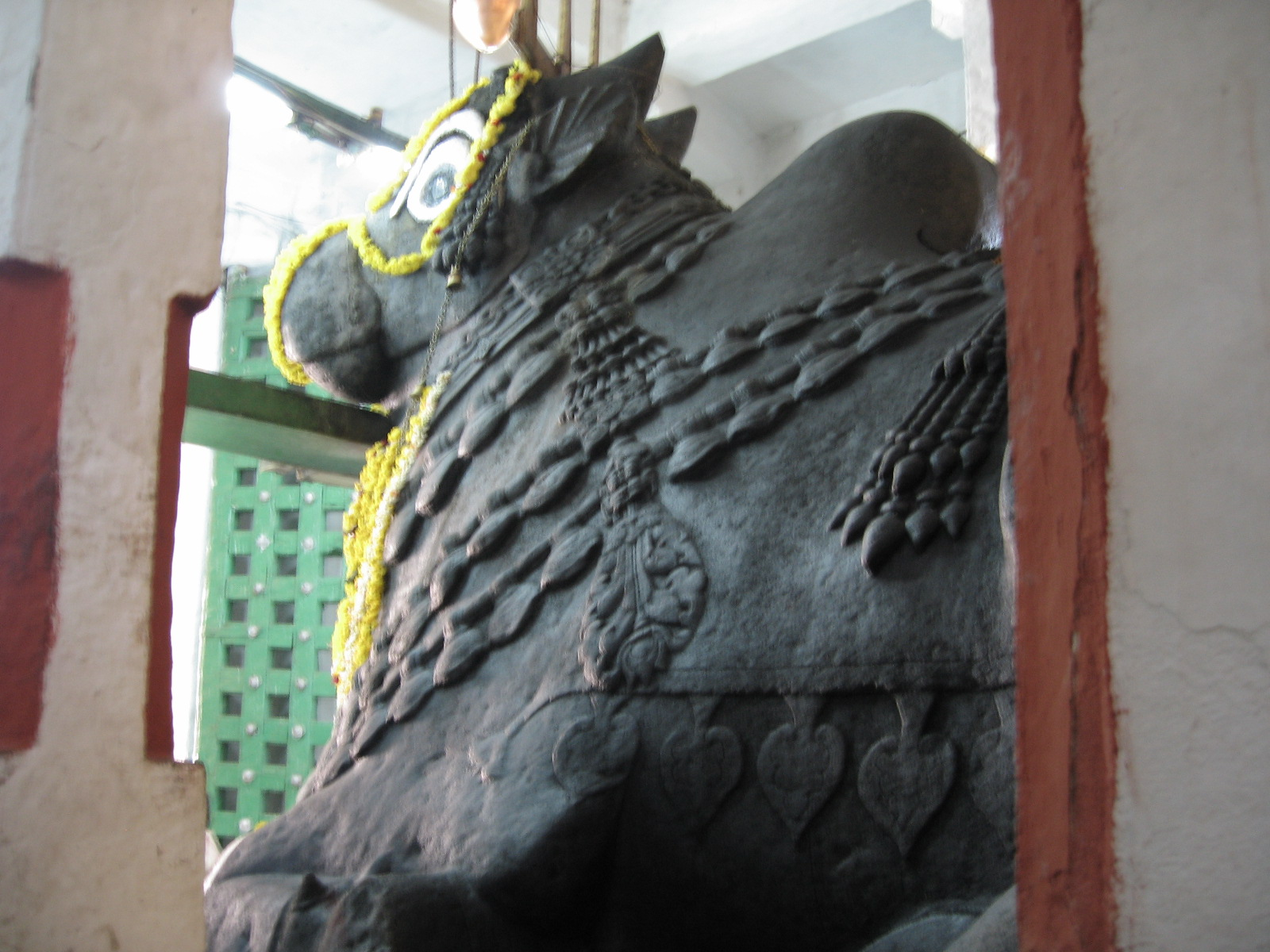
One of the biggest Nandi idols in the world

Nandi Temple is exclusively for the worship of the sacred bull (Basava in Kannada) in Hinduism, known as Nandi, Lord Shiva's vahana. The word "nandi" means "joyful" in Sanskrit.

The temple was built in 1537 by Kempe Gowda under the Vijayanagara Empire in the Vijayanagara architectural style, he also founded the city of Bengaluru. The temple is named after the large granite Nandi monolith placed on a plinth in the temple shrine (garbhagriha) which has become blackened from years of being rubbed with charcoal and oil. The temple is a small one, consisting only of the shrine fronted by a porch in the Vijayanagara style. The current tower (vimana) over the shrine was constructed in the early 20th century and is adorned with Saivite figures and motifs.

It is said to house one of the largest Nandi murthis in the world. The height of the murthi is approximately 15 ft (4.6 m) and it is approximately 20 feet (6.1 m) long.

== Bugle Rock garden ==
The Bugle Rock garden is behind the Dodda Ganesha temple and adjacent to the Bull temple. The garden gets its name from a bugle call made on top of a very large rock formation to alert the nearby dwellers. It is densely covered with trees and one can usually see and hear a number of bats perched on the trees. There is a water tank with motifs of famous people from Karnataka.

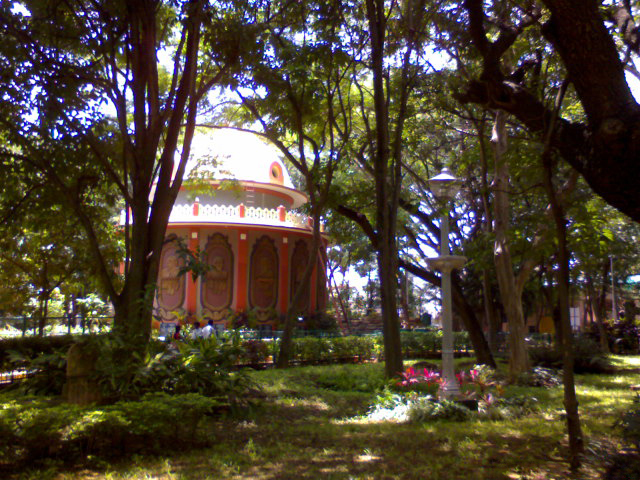
A view of the Bugle Rock garden

== See also ==
- Aarti
- Bugle Rock
- List of Hindu temples
- Vijayanagara Architecture

== Images ==
Sri Big Bull Temple in the Dodda Ganeshana Gudi complex, Bangalore

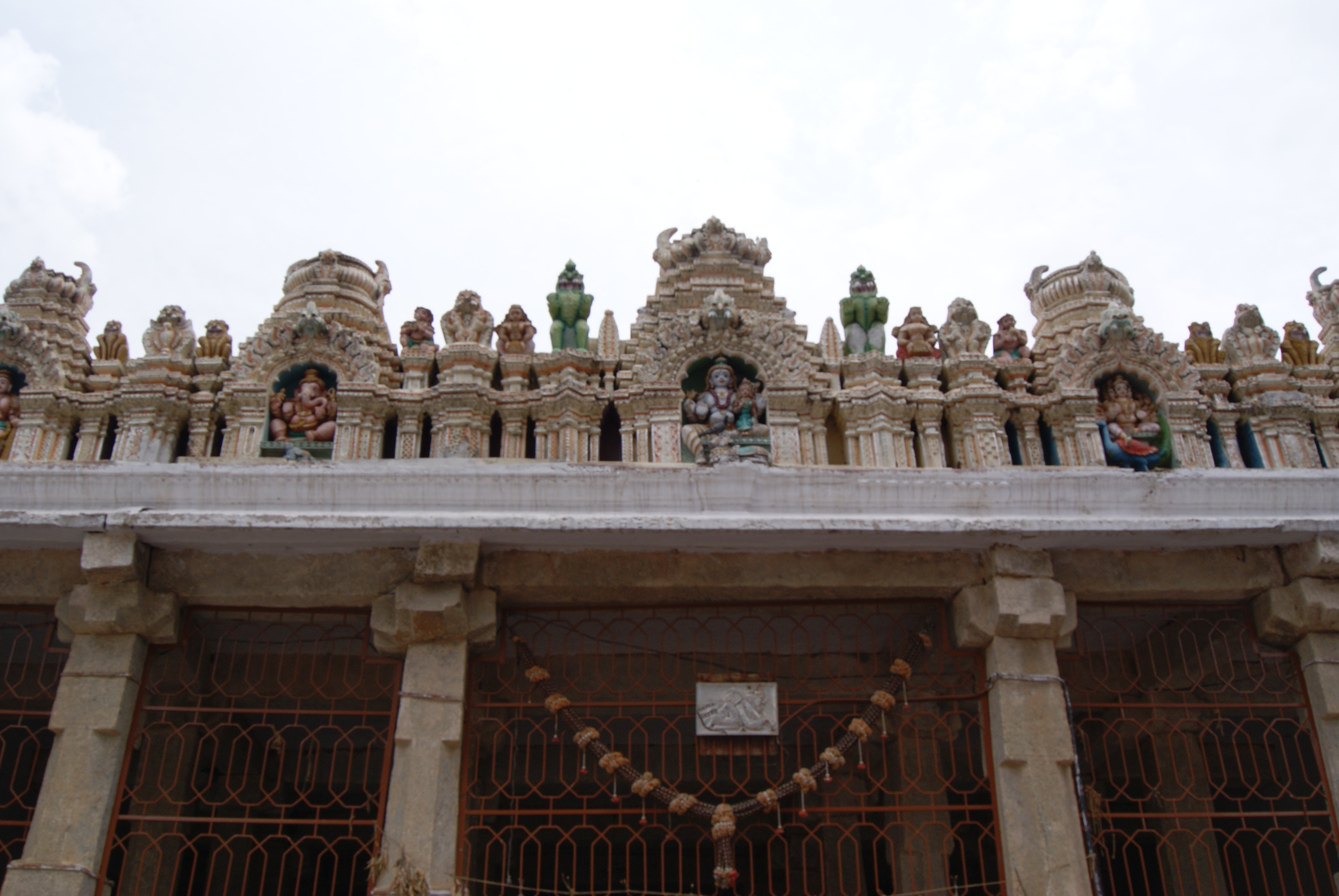

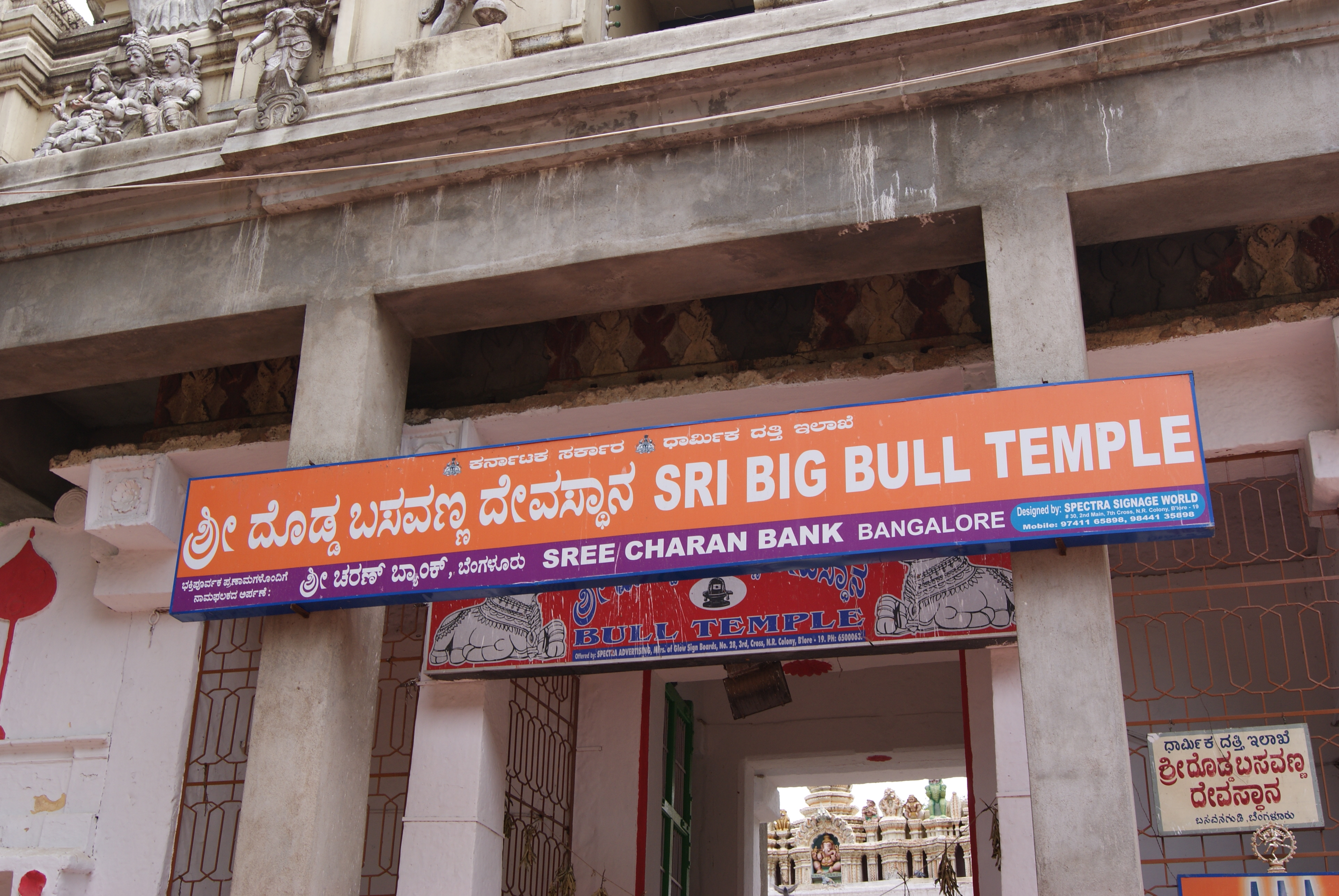

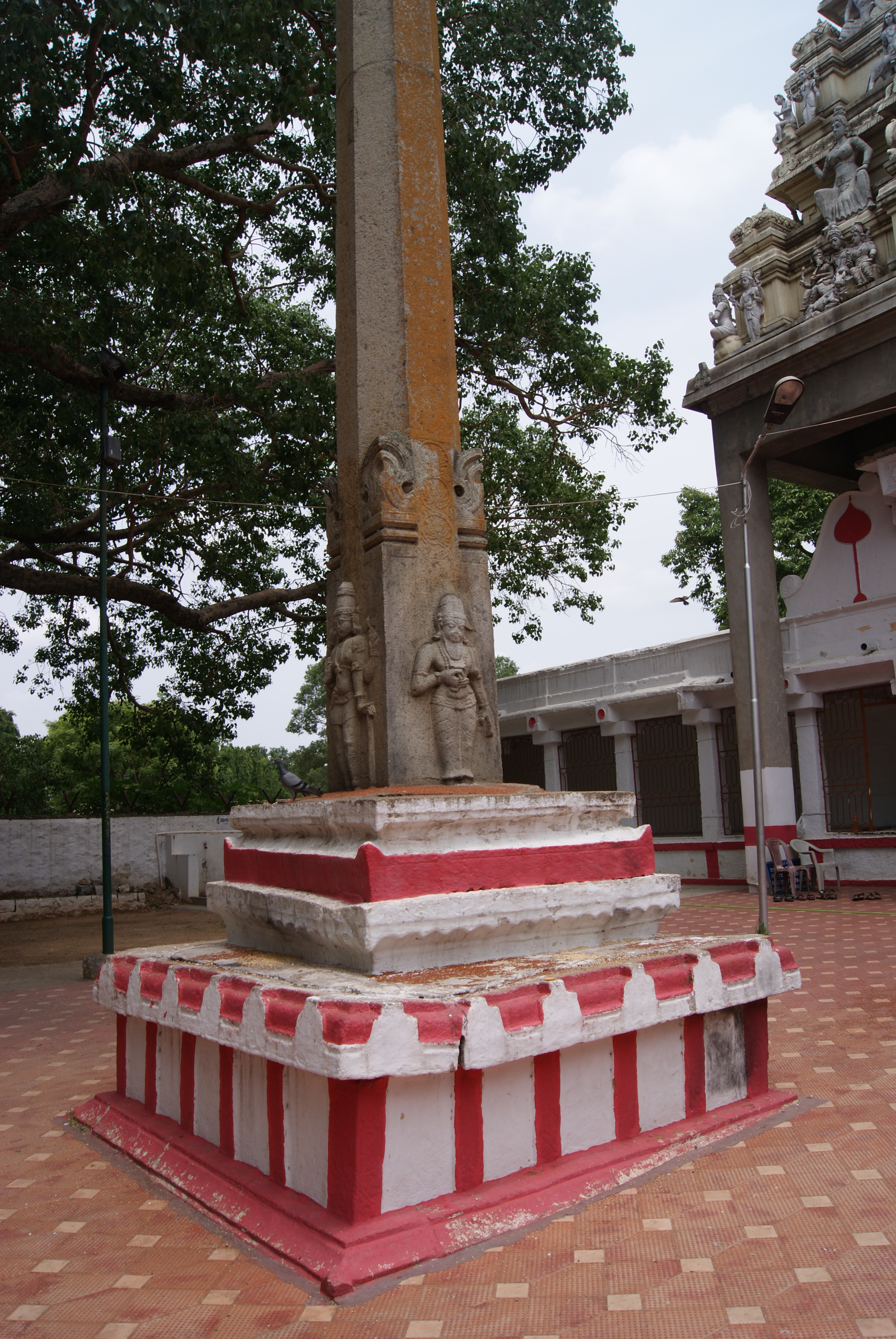
