= Bhuvanagiri =

Bhuvanagiri is the name of several places in India:

- Bhuvanagiri, Telangana or Bhongir, a town in Telangana
  - Yadadri Bhuvanagiri, a district of Telangana containing the town
    - Bhuvanagiri revenue division
  - Bhongir (Assembly constituency), of the Telangana Legislative Assembly
  - Bhongir (Lok Sabha constituency), in the lower house of the Indian parliament
  - Bhongir railway station
  - Bhongir Fort
  - Bhongir Municipal Corporation
- Bhuvanagiri, Tamil Nadu, a town and taluka (subdivision) in Tamil Nadu
  - Bhuvanagiri (State Assembly Constituency), in the Tamil Nadu Legislative Assembly
- Bhuvanagiri Punnaiah (born 2003), Indian cricketer
