= Tourism in Telangana =

°

The Telangana Tourism Development Corporation is a state government agency which promotes Tourism in Telangana, a state in the Southern region of India. The retired Director General of Police Pervaram Ramulu is the appointed First chairman of Telangana State Tourism. Tourist attractions in Telangana include historical places, monuments, forts, waterfalls, forests and temples.

Hyderabad, the state capital, placed 2nd in Traveler Magazine's best places to see in the world in 2015.

== Major tourist destinations ==
=== City tours ===
Hyderabad, Warangal, and Mulugu are the cities with many tourist places.

=== Monuments ===
Charminar at Hyderabad Telangana India

This Temple built with Bricks

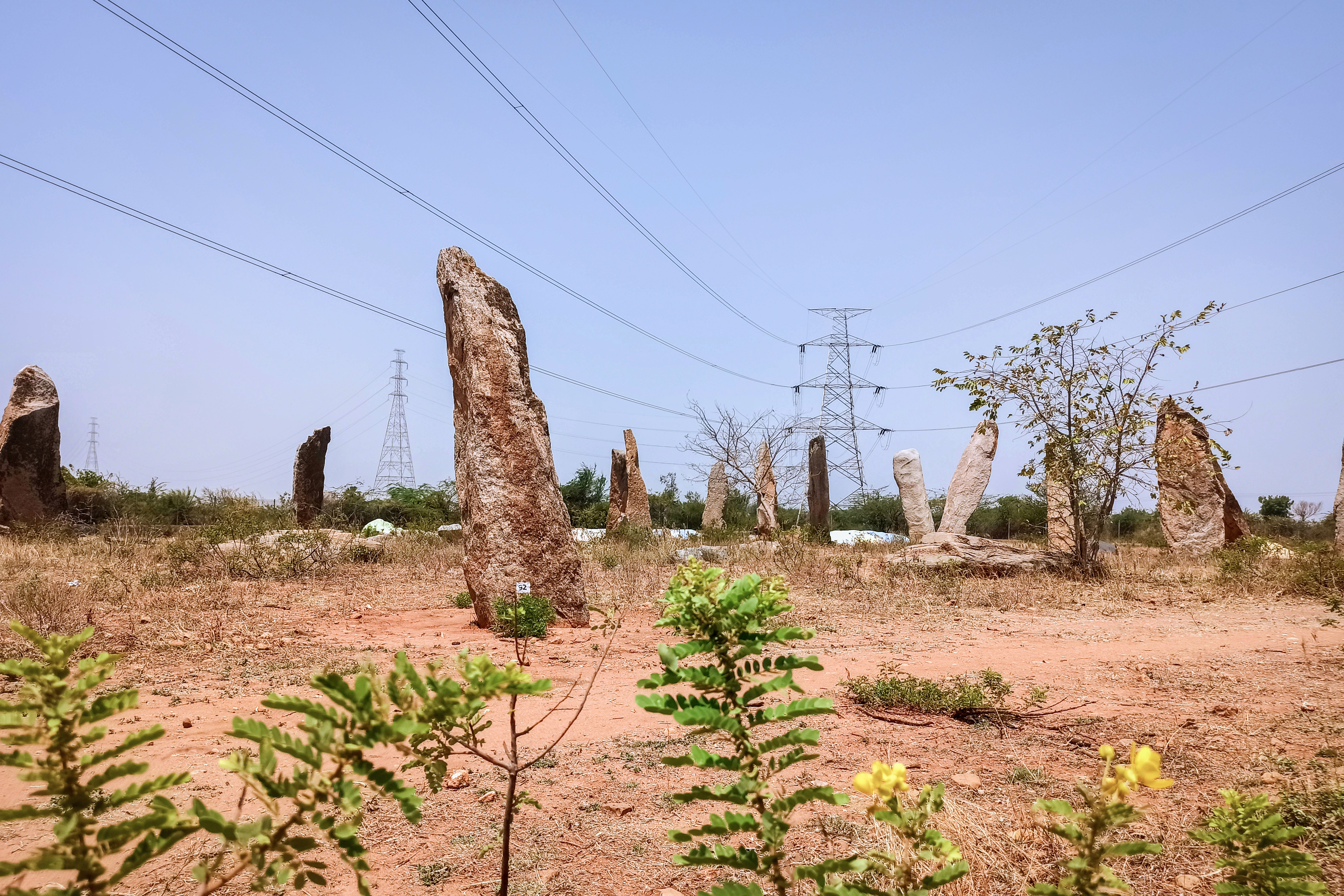
Mudumal Megalithic Menhirs Narayanapet Telanagana

Sunset at Raymonds Tomb Hyderabad

Nature view at Ananthagiri Hills

Aerail View of Anjanagiri Temple

Way To Ananthagiri Hills

Sunrise at Koilsagar Reservoir

Krishna River at Mahabubnagar

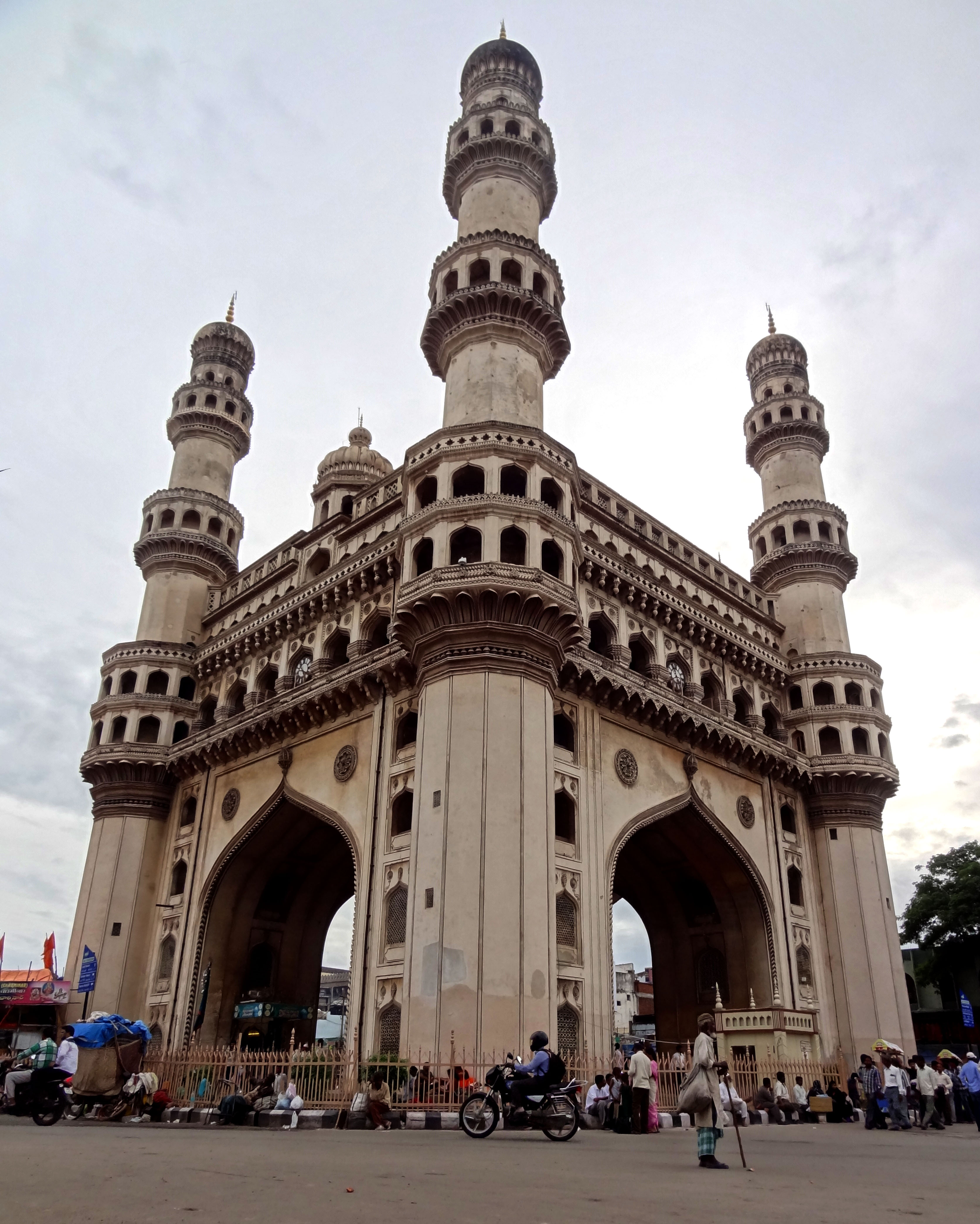
Charminar

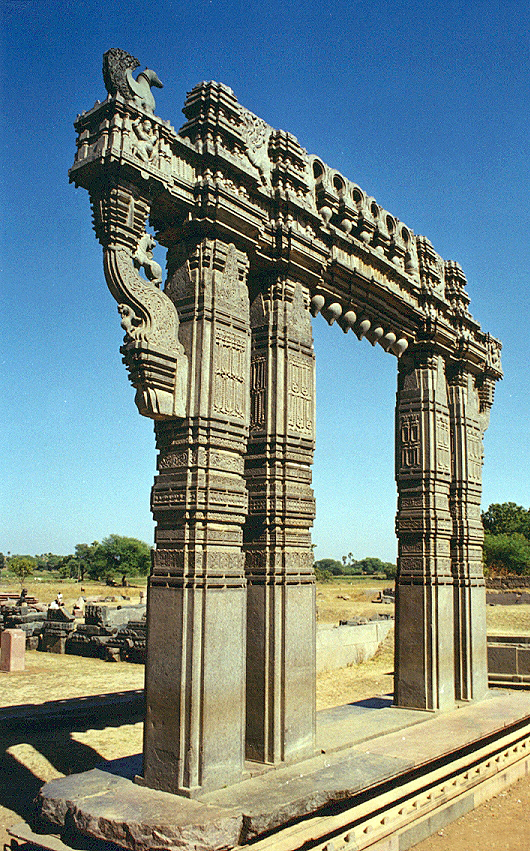
Kakatiya Kala Thoranam

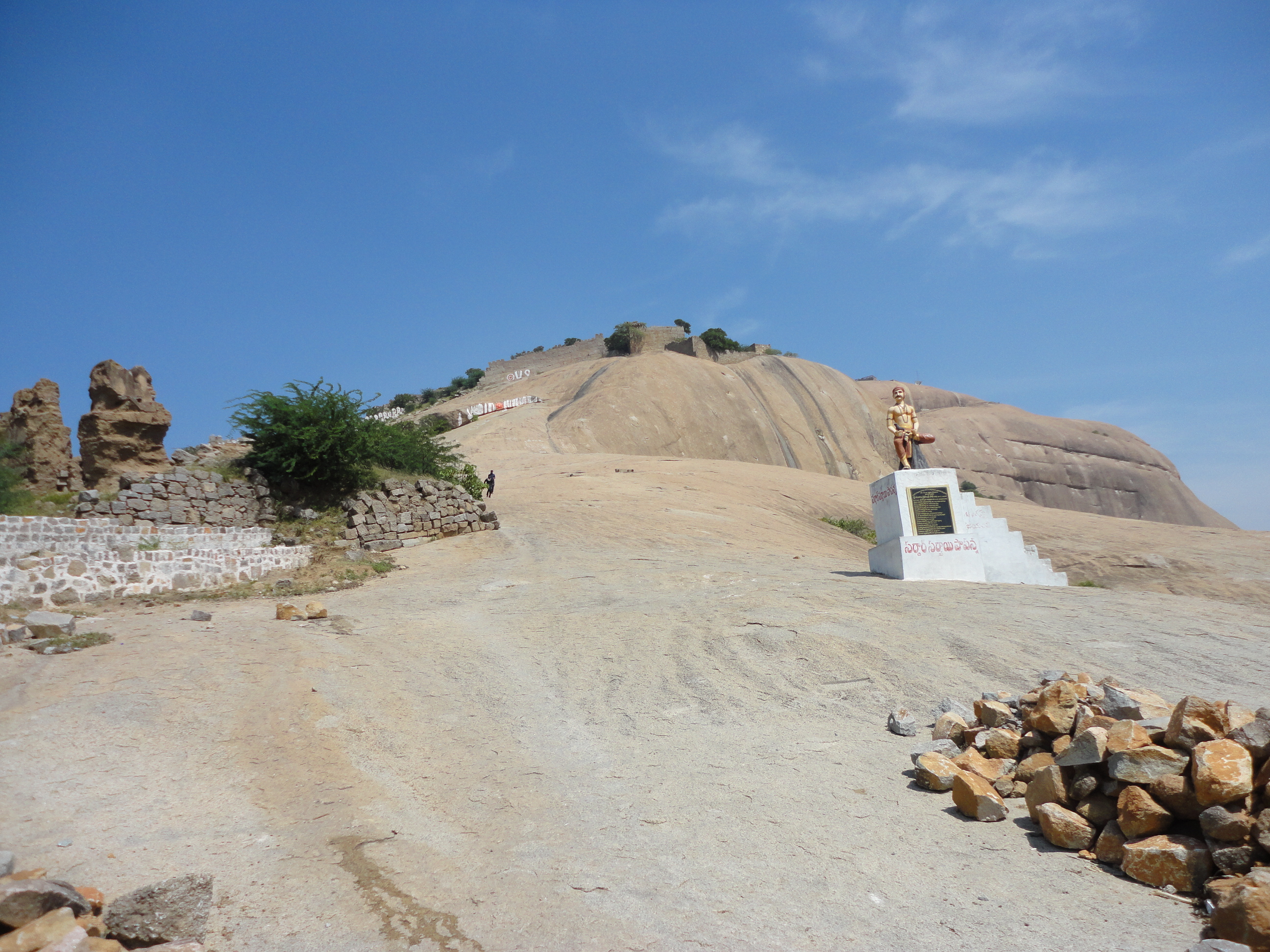
Bhongir Fort Entrance

Sri Ramalingeswara Swamy Temple Side view Nandikandi Sangareddy

Sri Lakshmi Chennakeshava Swamy Temple Ganagapuram Village

Charminar, Golconda Fort, Qutb Shahi Tombs, Chowmahalla Palace, Falaknuma Palace and Bhongir Fort, are some of the monuments in the state.

- Charminar, built in 1591 CE, is a monument and mosque located in Hyderabad, Telangana, India. The landmark has become a global icon of Hyderabad, listed among the most recognized structures of India. It was also the tallest structure in Hyderabad for nearly 400 years. The Charminar is on the east bank of Musi river. To the northeast lies the Laad Bazaar and in the west end lies the granite-made richly ornamented Makkah Masjid. The English name is a transliteration and combination of the Urdu words Chār and Minar, translating to "Four Towers"; the eponymous towers are ornate minarets attached and supported by four grand arches.
- Golconda Fort – Once abandoned by Qutub Shahis, Golconda Fort is one of the most magnificent fortress complexes in India. Seated on a hill on one side and a spiraling fort on the other, its location and internal design made it one of the strongest forts in India.
- Qutb Shahi Tombs – Home to various Tombs dedicated to Rulers of Qutub Shahi dynasty, located at Shaikpet, near Golconda Fort. These are an example of Deccan architecture with large minarets, huge domes, delicate marble designs, and multiple inner passages.
- Kakatiya Kala Thoranam: It is a historical arch and symbol of the Kakatiya Dynasty in Warangal district. The arch was built around 1200 CE during the rule of Kakatiya dynasty. It is a huge stone sculpture created as a Kirti Thoranam, meaning The Glory Arch.A depiction of the arch forms the main symbol in the Emblem of Telangana for the state of Telangana.
- Bhongir Fort:It is a Fort located in Bhongir, Nalgonda district, India. It was built in the 10th century on an isolated monolithic rock by the Western Chalukya ruler Tribhuvanamalla Vikramaditya VI and was thus named after him as Tribhuvanagiri.At the foot of the fortified rocks 609.6 meters above the sea level stands the town of Bhongir, it has a unique egg-shaped construction with two entry points protected by huge rocks, so the fort was considered practically impregnable by invading armies. The fort is associated with the rule of queen Rudramadevi and her grandson Prataparudra II.
- Paigah Tombs – These are a recently discovered series of mausoleums with unique geometrical sculptures which were nowhere found in the world. These are located at Chandrayanagutta. Paigahs were noblemen under the reign of Nizams. Paigah Mosque Spanish Mosque, Begumpet: This Mosque is one of the marvelous mosques present in Secunderabad/Hyderabad. It's well known among the people because of its amazing architecture. The architecture followed in this mosque is the Andalusi/Spanish Architecture. The mosque was constructed by Sir Vicar-ul-Umra a Paigah Nawab in 1906.

=== Religious tourism ===
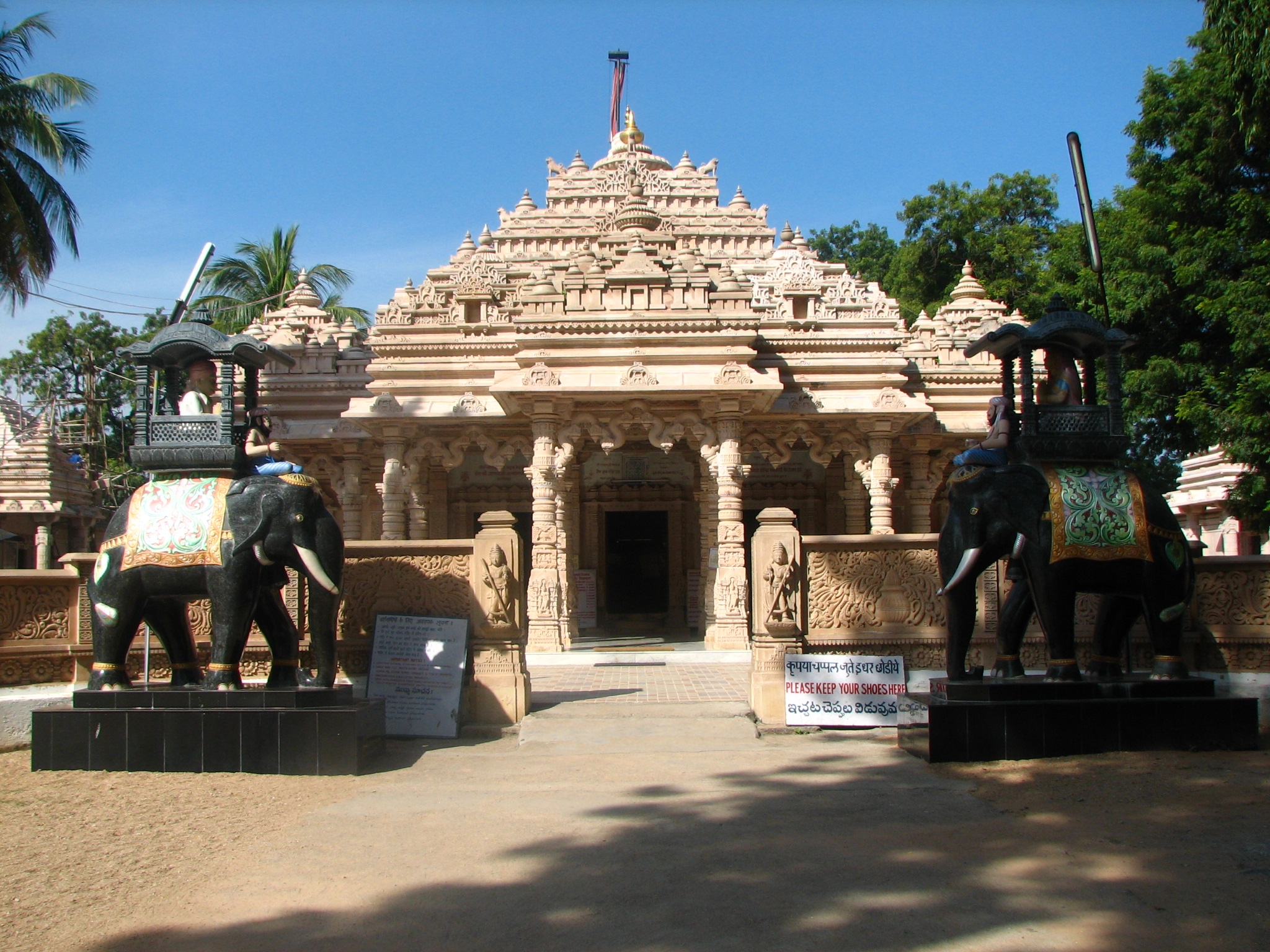
Kulpakji

- Kulpakji or Kolanupaka Temple: Kulpakji is a 2,000-year-old Jain Temple at the village of Kolanupaka in Nalgonda district. This temple is one of the oldest temples in South India and is considered famous for its state-of-the-art architecture and sculptures. The image of Lord Rishabhanatha, carved of a green stone has been historically famous as "Manikyaswami" and The 130 centimeters (51 in) statue of Lord Mahaveer is made of a single piece of jade. It is said the Manikyasami image of Rishabhantha was originally worshipped by Mandodari, the wife of Ravana and it was brought here by the ruler Sankar of Kalyana The interior of the temple is made by red sandstone and white marble.
- Yadagirigutta: Lord Vishnu (whose reincarnation is Lord Narasimha). The main deity is Lakshmi Narasimha Swamy. Located in Nalgonda District. In Ancient days Sri Yada Maharshi son of Sri Rushyashrunga Maharshi with the Blessings of Anjaneya Swamy had performed great penance for Lord Narasimha Swamy. After securing blessing for his penance Lord Narasimha had come into existence in Five Avatharas called as Sri Jwala Narasimha, Sri Yogananda Narasimha, Sri Ugra Narasimha, Sri Gandaberunda Narasimha, Sri Lakshmi Narasimha. As such this is known as "Pancha Narasimha Kshetram"
- Thousand Pillar Temple is one of the oldest temples of South India that was built by the kakatiya. It is believed that the Thousand Pillar Temple was built by King Rudra Deva in 1163 AD. The Thousand Pillar Temple is a specimen of the Kakatiyan style of architecture of the 12th century. There are one thousand pillars in the building and the temple, but no pillar obstructs a person in any point of the temple to see the god in the other temple.

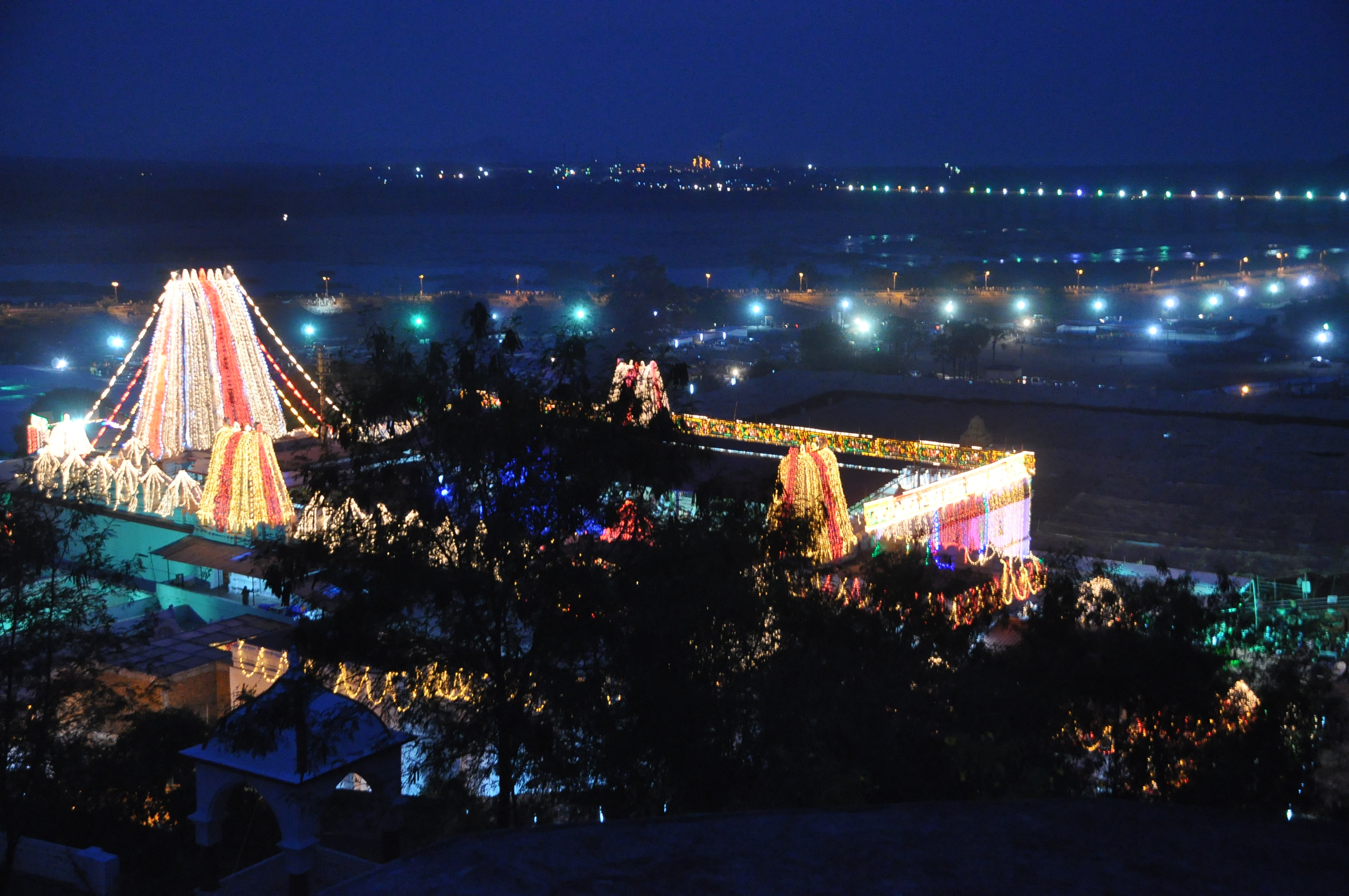
Bhadrachalam Temple

- Bhadrachalam Temple is a temple to Lord Rama in the town of Bhadrachalam in Khammam district. It is situated on the banks of the river Godavari. This is the place where Kancherla Gopanna (1620–1680) wrote his devotional songs dedicated to Lord Rama. Sri Rama Navami, a celebration of the Marriage of Lord Rama and Sita, is celebrated here every year. The government of Telangana sends pearls for the event.
- Sri Raja Rajeshwara Temple, Vemulawada is a site of pilgrimage for both Hindu (particularly devotees of Vishnu and Shiva) and Muslim worshippers. Built by Chalukya Kings between AD 750 and 975, the complex is named for its presiding deity Sri Raja Rajeswara Swamy, an incarnation of Lord Shiva. It houses several temples dedicated to other deities including Sri Rama, Lakshmana, Lakshmi, Ganapathy, Lord Padmanabha Swamy and Lord Bhimeshwara.This Shrine is popularly known as ‘Dakshina Kasi’ [Southern Banaras] and also as "Harihara Kshetram" for their being two Vaisnava Temples in main Temple complex i.e., Sri Anantha Padmanabha Swamy Temple & Sri Seetharama Chandra Swamy Temple The complex also contains a 400-year-old mosque which stands as an ample evidence for religious tolerance. The temple is located in Karimnagar District.
- Ramappa Temple: An inscription in the temple dates it to the year 1213 and said to have been built by a General Recherla Rudra, during the period of the Kakatiya ruler Ganapati Deva.

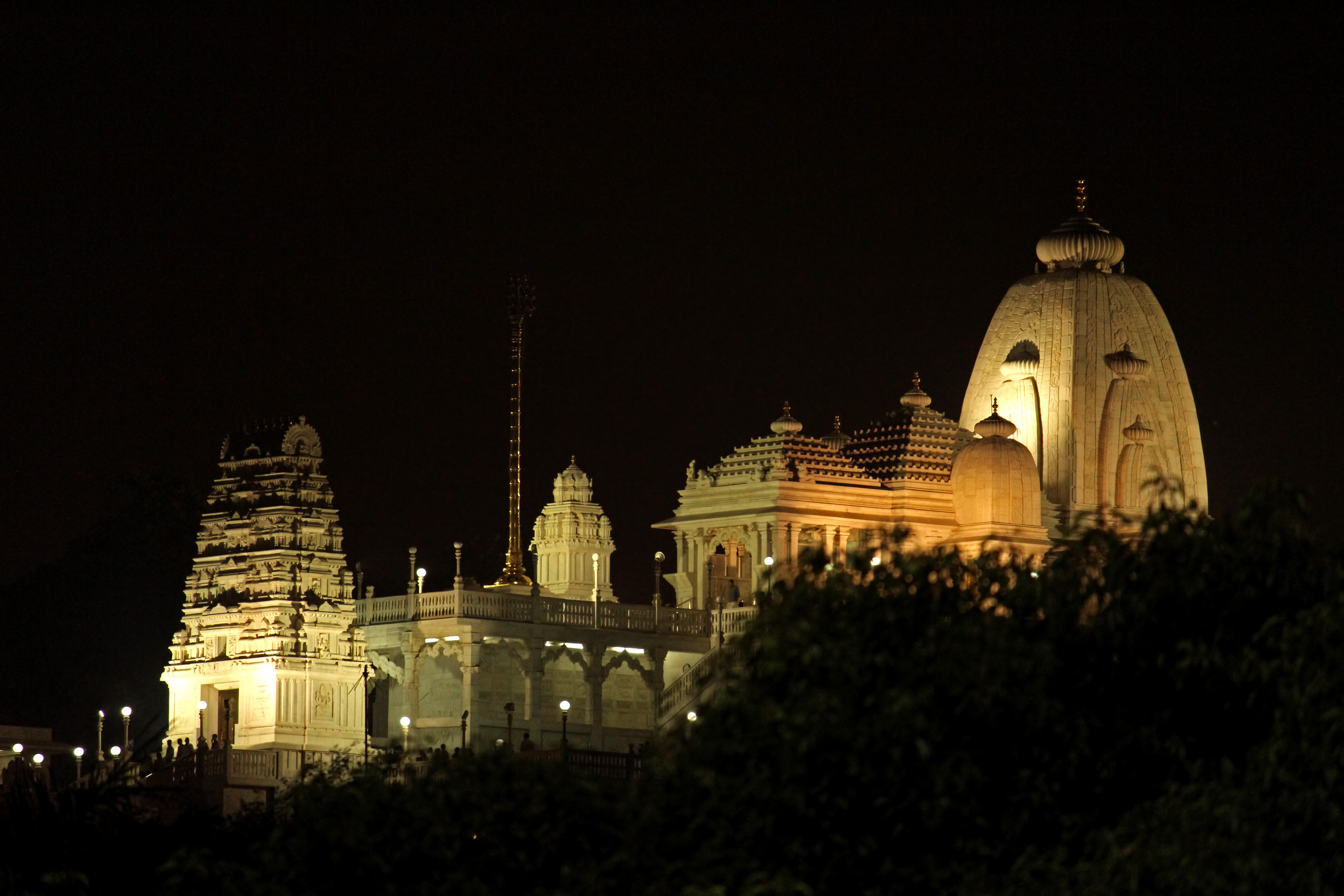
Birla Mandir, Hyderabad night view

- Birla Mandir, Hyderabad: Built on a 280 feet (85 m) high hillock called Naubath Pahad on a 13 acres (53,000 m2) plot in Hyderabad
- Basara: Gnana Saraswati Temple (Goddess of Knowledge) is located on the banks of the river Godavari in Adilabad District
- Nelakondapalli:NelakondapallIis famous for Birthplace of Bhakta Ramadasu (Sri Ramadas) who built the Sita Ramachandraswamy temple at Bhadrachalam, Nelakondapally is famous for 'Budha Stupa', South India's biggest budha stupa located at Nelakondaplly, It is Shariraka stupa (built on body part of Lord Bhudha) in 3rd century B.C.

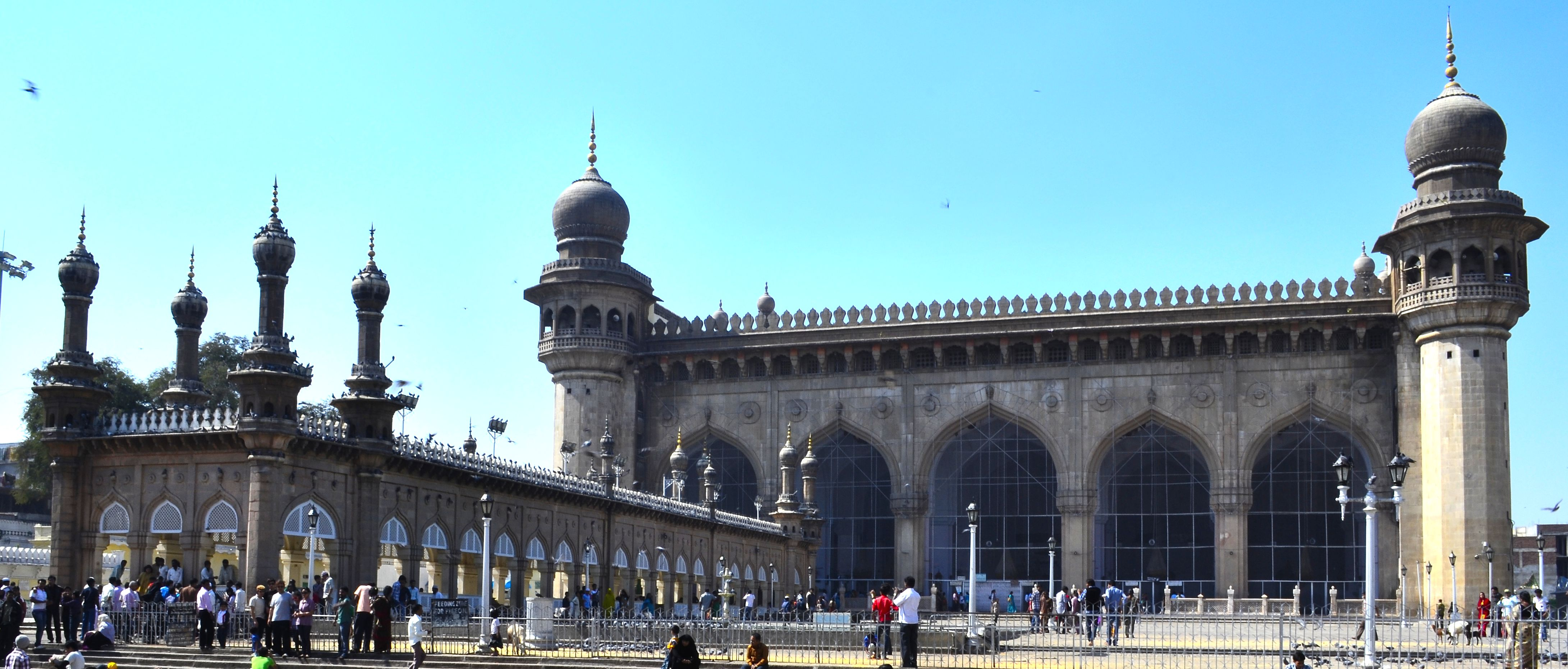
Mecca Masjid frontage

- Mecca Masjid, is one of the oldest mosques in Hyderabad, Telangana in India, And it is one of the largest Mosques in India. Makkah Masjid is a listed heritage building in the old city of Hyderabad, close to the historic landmarks of Chowmahalla Palace, Laad Bazaar, and Charminar. Muhammad Quli Qutb Shah, the fifth ruler of the Qutb Shahi dynasty, commissioned bricks to be made from the soil brought from Mecca, the holiest site of Islam, and used them in the construction of the central arch of the mosque, thus giving the mosque its name. It formed the centerpiece around which the city was planned by Muhammad Quli Qutub Shah.

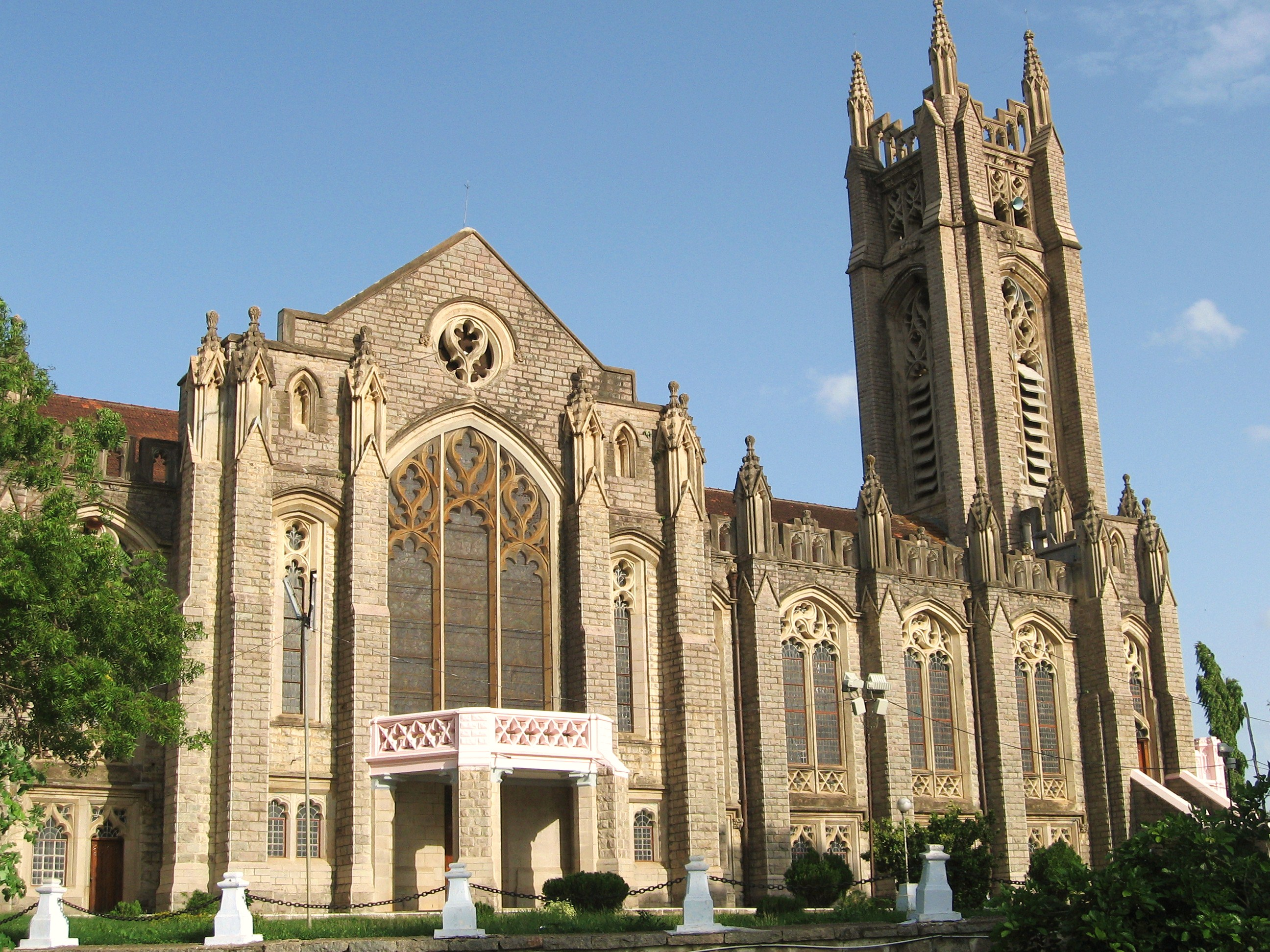
The Church of South India Cathedral at Medak, one of the largest churches in Asia

- Medak Church at Medak in Telangana, India, is the largest church in Telangana and has been the cathedral church of the Diocese of Medak of the Church of South India since 1947. Originally built by British Wesleyan Methodists, it was consecrated on 25 December 1924. The Medak diocese is the single largest diocese in Asia and the second in the world after the Vatican. The church was built under the stewardship of the Methodist Christian, the Reverend Charles Walker Posnett, who was driven by the motto My best for my Lord. Charles Posnett had arrived in Secunderabad in 1895, and after first ministering among British soldiers at Trimullghery, had launched into the villages and had reached Medak village in 1896.
- Kuchadri Sri venkateshwara swamy temple an ancient Hindu temple in Kuchanpally, Medak District
- Other religious places include the Buddhist centres at Nelakondapalli, Dhulikatta Phanigiri and Kolanpaka.

=== Water falls ===
- Bogatha Waterfall is located on the Cheekupally stream, Wazeedu Mandal, Mulugu district, Telangana. It is located 120 kilometers (75 mi) from Bhadrachalam, 90 kilometers (56 mi) from Mulugu and 140 kilometers (87 mi) from Warangal. It is known as "the Telangana Niagara".
- Kuntala Waterfall, located in Kuntala, Adilabad district, at 45 metres (148 ft), is the biggest in the state. There are other interesting waterfalls in Telangana state.
- Mallela Theertham, at a distance of 58 km from Srisailam & 173 km from Hyderabad is a charming waterfall located in the dense Nallamala Forest. This is one of the popular tourist attractions to visit around Hyderabad.
- Bheemuni Paadam Waterfalls: At a distance of 10 km from Gudur Bus Stand, 51 km from Warangal, 88 km from Khammam Bus Station and 200 km from Hyderabad, Bheemuni Paadam Waterfalls is a picturesque waterfall located at Gudur in Warangal District of Telangana.
- Pochera Falls (Near Kuntala Falls) - At a distance of 40 km from Nirmal, 50 km from Adilabad, 257 km from Hyderabad and 22 km from Kuntala Falls, Pochera Falls is a pretty waterfall on the Kadam River. The falls are located at a distance of 10 km from Neredikonda village between Nirmal & Adilabad (a diversion is required at Boath cross roads)
- Gayatri Waterfalls- At a distance of 5 km from Tarnam Khurd Village, 19 km from Kuntala Waterfalls, 38 km from Nirmal, 59 km from Adilabad and 270 km from Hyderabad, Gayathri Waterfalls is a beautiful place located in Adilabad district of Telangana.

=== Other attractions ===
- Nirmal is famous for its handicrafts and paintings.
- Badapahad Dargah or Peddagutta is one of the oldest Muslim Pilgrim Centers of the region. Built in memory of the saint Syed Sadullah Hussain, the dargah is built on top of a hillock near Jakora in the Varni Mandal of Nizamabad District.
- Ramoji Film City is one of the best tourist attraction in Hyderabad.
- Wonderla is one of the biggest amusement parks in Hyderabad, Having many dry and water rides where people from any age group can enjoy it.

== See also ==
- Tourism in Marathwada
