= Yerrambelly =

- village
- Location in Telangana, India Yerrambelly (India)
- Coordinates: 17.4618668°N 78.9553126°E
- Country: India
- State: Telangana
- District: Yadadri Bhuvanagiri district

Languages
  - Official: Telugu
- Time zone: UTC+5:30 (IST)
- PIN: 508116
- Telephone code: 08685
- Vehicle registration: TS
- Nearest city: Hyderabad
- Lok Sabha constituency: Bhongiri
- Vidhan Sabha constituency: Bhongiri
- Website: telangana.gov.in

Yerrambelly is a village in Yadadri Bhuvanagiri district of Telangana, India. It falls under Bhongir mandal. Located 76 KM north from district headquarters Nalgonda The size of the area is around 28.03 square kilometers.

The total population of Yerrambelly is 4,260 citizens. Consisting of 2,162 males and 2,098 females.

Language spoken in Yerrambelly is Telugu and Urdu.
