= Wadaigudem =

- village
- Location in Telangana, India Wadaigudem (India)
- Coordinates: 17.488131°N 78.8896259°E
- Country: India
- State: Telangana
- District: Yadadri Bhuvanagiri district

Languages
  - Official: Telugu
- Time zone: UTC+5:30 (IST)
- Telephone code: 08720
- Vehicle registration: TS 30
- Nearest city: Hyderabad
- Lok Sabha constituency: Bhongir
- Vidhan Sabha constituency: Bhongir
- Website: telangana.gov.in

Wadaigudem is a village in Yadadri Bhuvanagiri district of Telangana, India. It falls under Bhuvanagiri mandal.
