= Ramachandrapur =

Ramachandrapuram
- village
- Location in Telangana, India Ramachandrapuram (India)
- Coordinates: 17.5038562°N 78.9581126°E
- Country: India
- State: Telangana
- District: Yadadri Bhuvanagiri district

Government
  - Type: Panchayati raj (India)
  - Body: Gram panchayat

Languages
  - Official: Telugu
- Time zone: UTC+5:30 (IST)
- PIN: 508222
- Telephone code: 08684
- Vehicle registration: TG
- Nearest city: Hyderabad
- Lok Sabha constituency: Bhongir
- Vidhan Sabha constituency: Bhongir
- Website: telangana.gov.in

Ramachandrapuram is a village in Yadadri district of the Indian state of Telangana. It is administered under Bhongir mandal of Bhongir revenue division.
