= Andhra Pradesh Tourism Development Corporation =

State government agency in Andhra Pradesh, India

Andhra Pradesh Tourism Development Corporation ఆంధ్ర రాష్ట్ర పర్యాటక అభివృద్ధి సంస్థ

Public Sector Undertaking overview
- Formed: 1976
- Type: Tourism, Package tour
- Jurisdiction: Andhra Pradesh, India
- Headquarters: Vijayawada, Andhra Pradesh, India
- Motto: Everything's possible!
- Parent department: Department of Youth Advancement, Tourism and Culture, Government of Andhra Pradesh
- Website: www.aptourism.gov.in

The Andhra Pradesh Tourism Development Corporation (APTDC) is a state government agency which promotes tourism in Andhra Pradesh, India.

The department offers tour packages of Heritage, Nature, Adventure, Health and Rural tourism representing rich historical and natural background of Andhra Pradesh state. The tours covering 8 centers of Andhra Pradesh. The department maintains resorts at popular tourism destinations such as Tirupati, Horseley hills, Araku valley, Vizag and Srisailam. A wide range of vehicles including 63 hi-tech coaches, 29 Volvo coaches, 8 air-conditioned hi-tech coaches, 4 semi-sleepers, 11 mini vehicles, 1 vintage coach and 10 Qualis are being used.

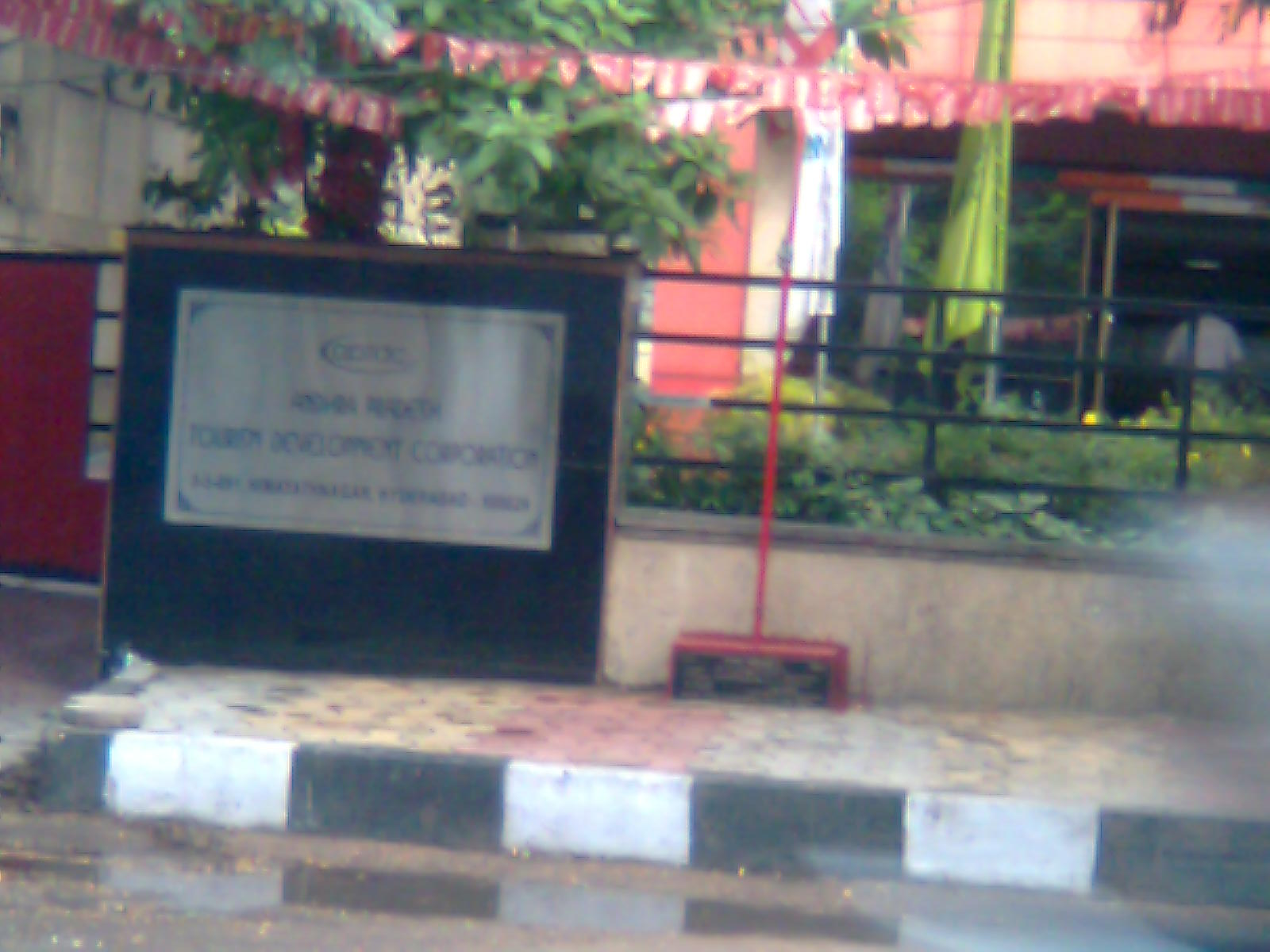
Office of Andhra Pradesh Tourism Development Corporation.

APTDC is also promoting leisure tourism in the state of Andhra Pradesh. It has identified a number of potential tourism developments. In 2006, it opened an office to serve the Tamil Nadu market.

== Destination Andhra Pradesh ==
AP is 3rd highest in India in terms of number of visits by tourists to Indian states. In 2013, 152.1 million domestic tourists visited Andhra Pradesh which was about 13.3% of the total domestic tourism market. There are Scenic locations, Beaches, Reservoirs and Pristine Forest areas in the state. 100% exemption of luxury tax for all new tourism infrastructure projects that meets certain minimum requirements is provided by Authorities.

== See also ==
- Tourism in Andhra Pradesh
- Tourism in Telangana
- Tourism in Karnataka
- Tourism in Kerala
- Tourism in Maharashtra
- Tourism in Tamil Nadu
- Tourism in India
