= Muthireddy Gudem =

- Village
- Country: India
- State: Telangana

Population (present)
  - Total: 3,000

Languages
  - Official: Telugu
- Time zone: UTC+5:30 (IST)
- PIN: 508111
- Vehicle registration: AP 24

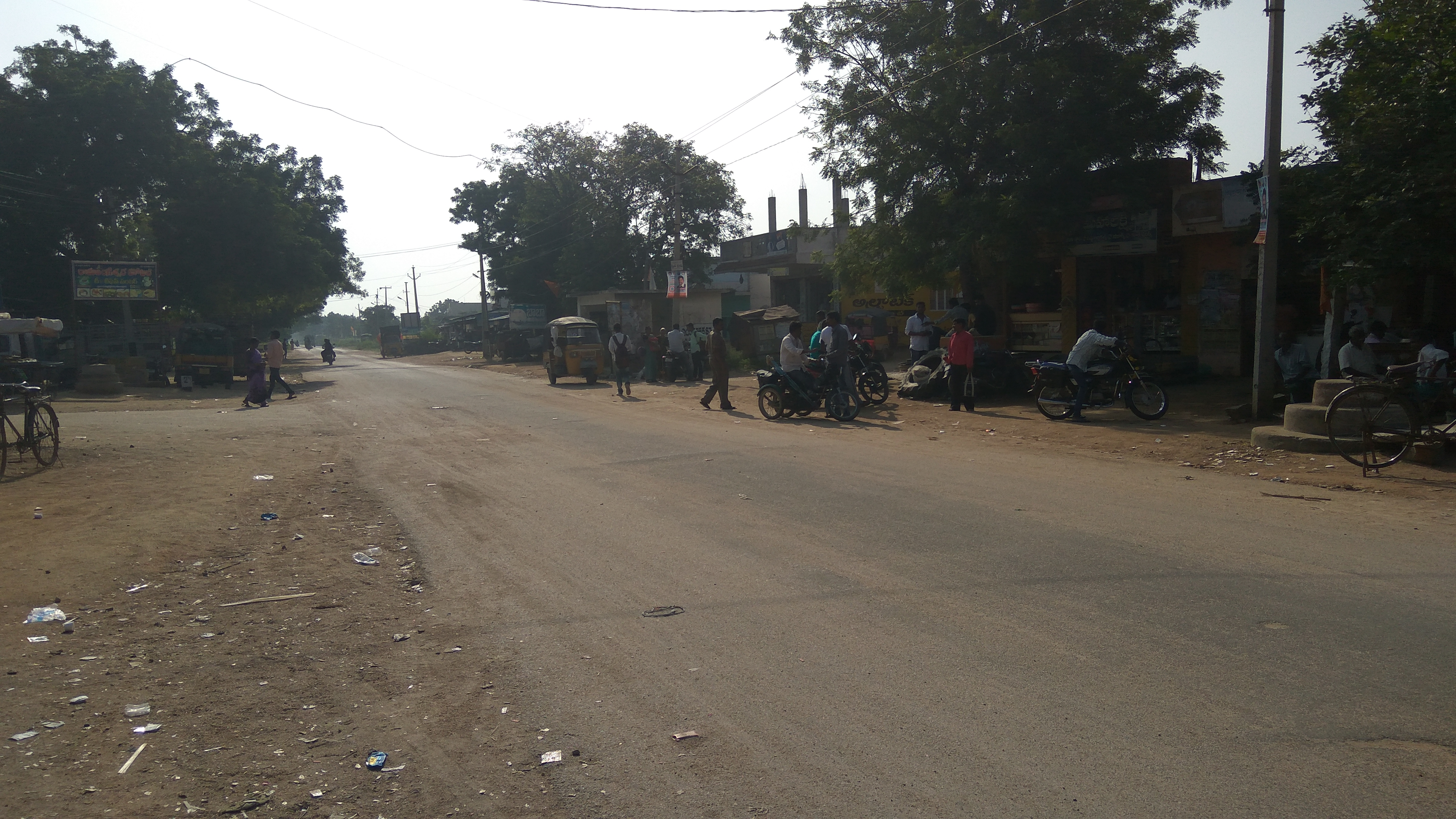
Main Road in Muthireddy Gudem

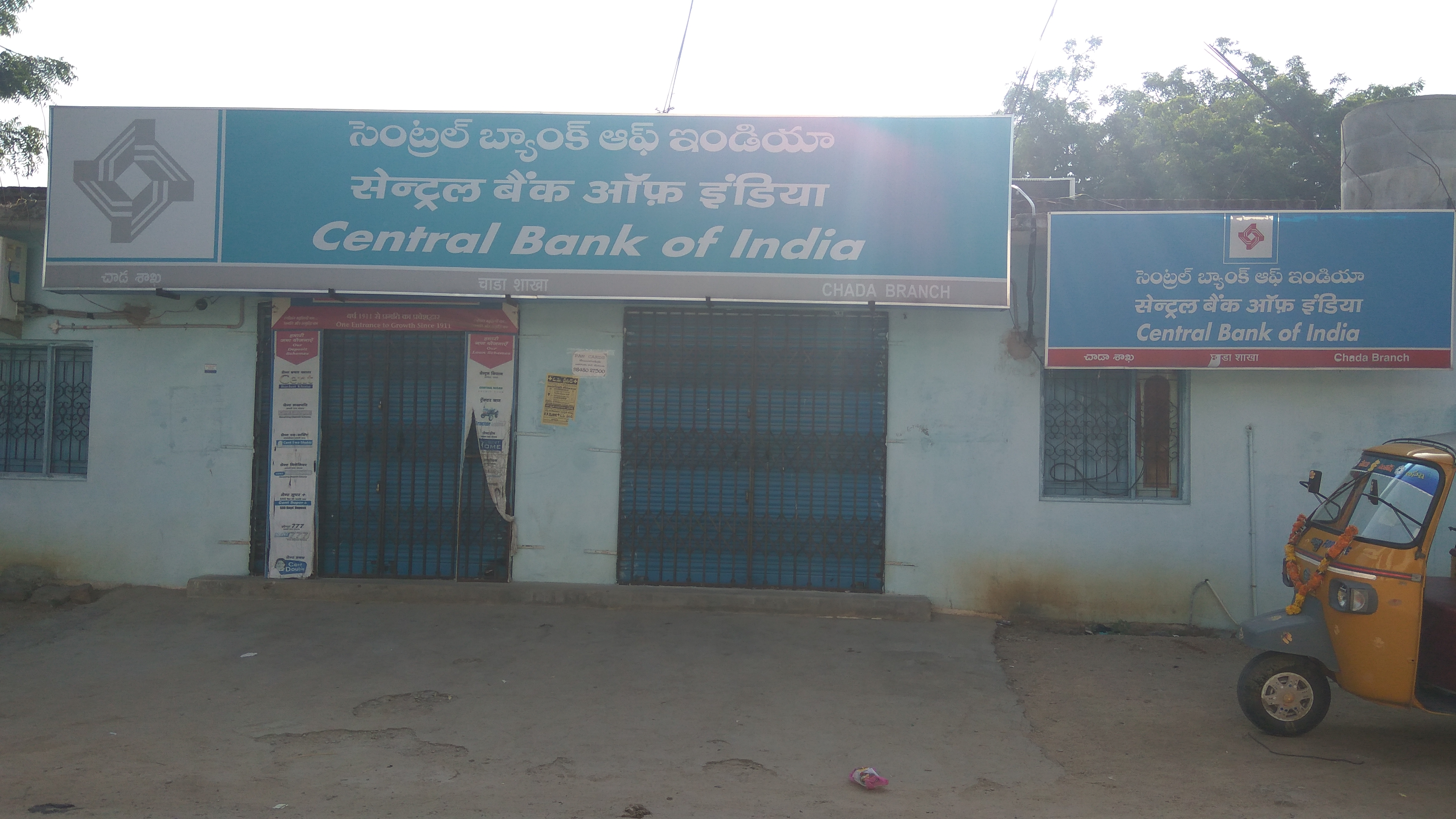
Bank in Muthireddy Gudem

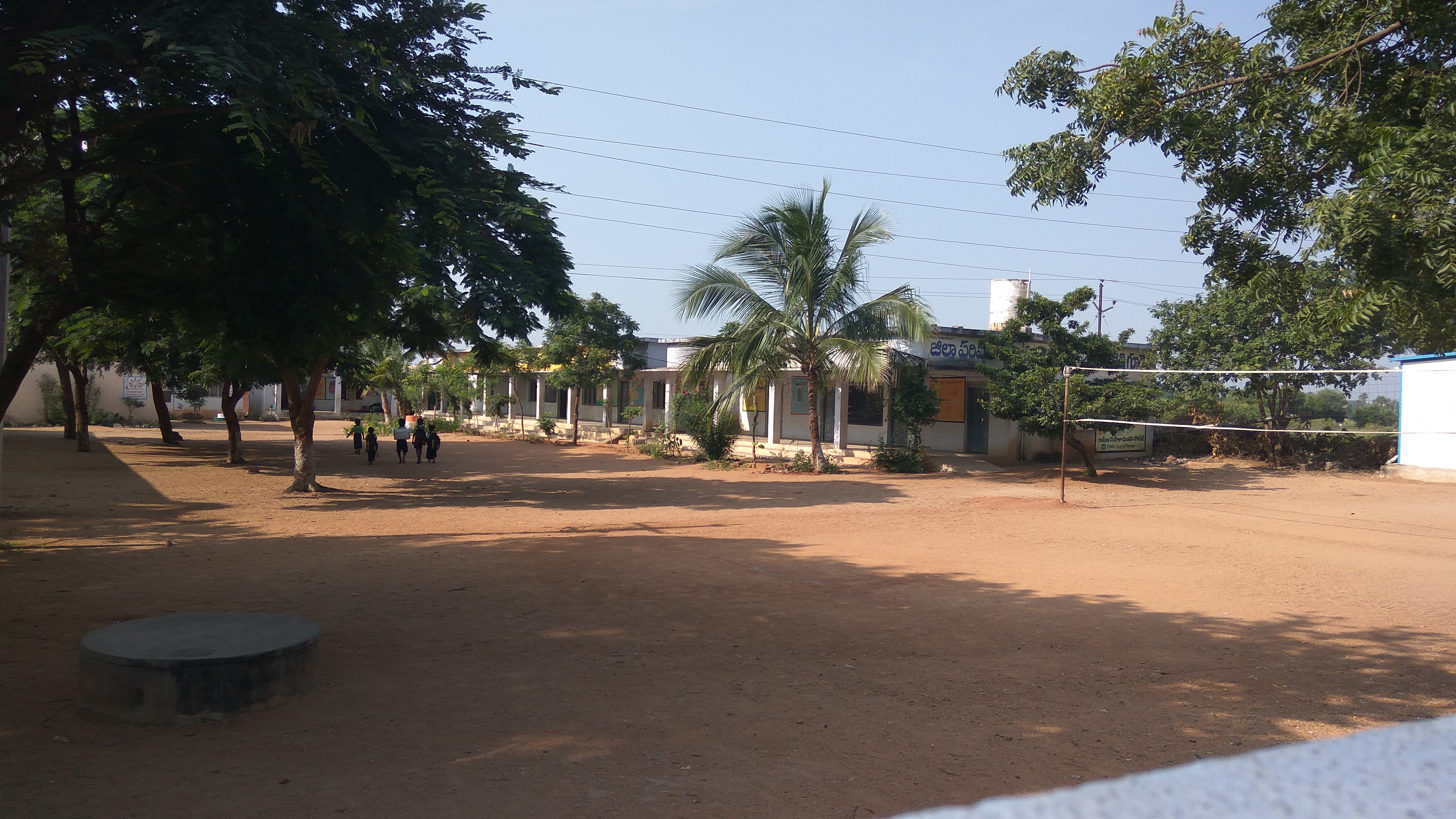
School in Muthireddy Gudem

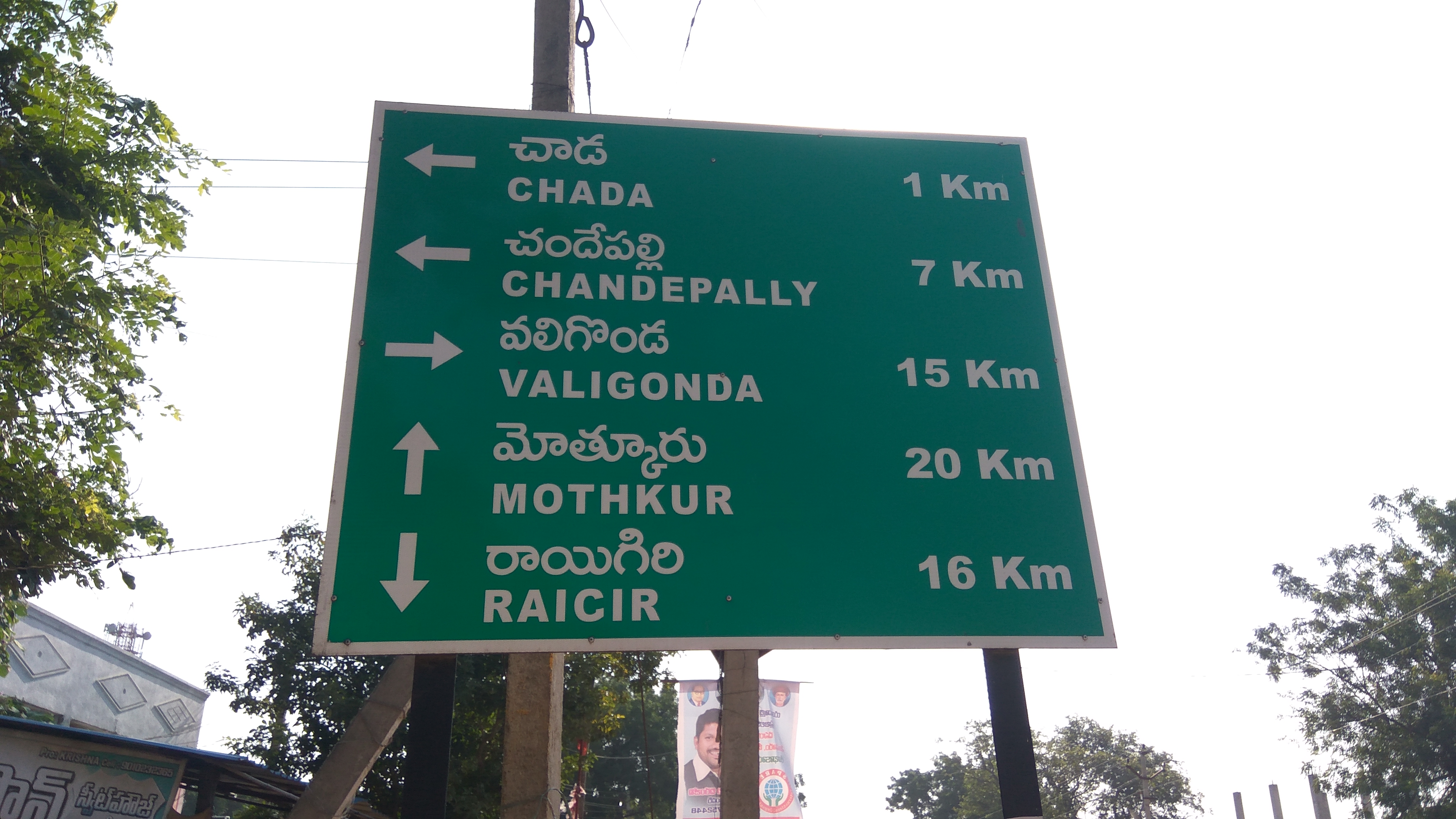
Name board of Muthireddy Gudem

Muthireddy Gudem is a village in Yadadri district in Telangana, India. It falls under Bhongir mandal, 15 km away on the NH 202.
