= Jammapur =

Jammapur Gemmapur
- village
- Nickname: It was named by Italian priest in remembrance of Sin Gemma
- Location in Telangana, India Jammapur (India)
- Coordinates: 17.5509489°N 78.9616588°E
- Country: India
- State: Telangana
- District: Yadadri Bhuvanagiri district

Government
  - Type: Panchayati raj (India)
  - Body: Gram panchayat
- Elevation: 455 m (1,493 ft)

Languages
  - Official: Telugu
- Time zone: UTC+5:30 (IST)
- Telephone code: 08720
- Vehicle registration: TG
- Nearest city: Hyderabad
- Lok Sabha constituency: Bhongiri
- Vidhan Sabha constituency: Bhongiri
- Website: telangana.gov.in

Jammapur is a village in Yadadri Bhuvanagiri district of Telangana, India. It falls under Bhongir mandal. It is located 52 kilometres (32 mi) from the state capital at Hyderabad.

Jammapur actual name is Gemmapur was named by Italian Priest in remembrance of saint Gemma Galgani and 100% Roman Catholics. People of Gemmapuram completely rely on Agriculture and farming. Largest catholic village in Yadadri District.It started with one family but people from this village spread across the Globe. All believe in God

== https://bible.usccb.org/daily-bible-reading ==
https://www.ewtn.com/catholicism/daily-readings
