= Ghouse Nagar =

- village
- Location in Telangana, India Ghouse Nagar (India)
- Coordinates: 17.4760423°N 78.9675926°E
- Country: India
- State: Telangana
- District: Yadadri Bhuvanagiri district

Languages
  - Official: Telugu
- Time zone: UTC+5:30 (IST)
- Telephone code: 08720
- Vehicle registration: TS
- Nearest city: Hyderabad
- Lok Sabha constituency: Bhongiri
- Vidhan Sabha constituency: Bhongiri
- Website: telangana.gov.in

Ghousenagar is a village in Yadadri Bhuvanagiri district of Telangana, India. It falls under Bhongir mandal. It is 10km from Bhongiri.
