= Thukkapur, Bhongir mandal =

Thukkapur
- village
- Location in Telangana, India Thukkapur (India)
- Coordinates: 17.4831639°N 78.9259546°E
- Country: India
- State: Telangana
- District: Yadadri Bhuvanagiri district

Government
  - Type: Panchayati raj (India)
  - Body: Gram panchayat

Languages
  - Official: Telugu
- Time zone: UTC+5:30 (IST)
- Telephone code: 08720
- Vehicle registration: TG
- Nearest city: Hyderabad
- Lok Sabha constituency: Bhongiri
- Vidhan Sabha constituency: Bhongiri
- Website: telangana.gov.in

Surpunch = Janagam Pandu

Thukkapur is a village in Yadadri Bhuvanagiri district of Telangana, India. It falls under Bhongir mandal.

Thukkapur is a Village in Bhuvanagiri Mandal in Nalgonda District of Telangana State, India. It belongs to Telangana region . It is located 70 KM towards North from District head quarters Nalgonda. 3 KM from Bhuvanagiri.

Thukkapur Pin code is 508285 and postal head office is Tekula Somaram .

Penchikalpahad ( 4 KM ), Yerrambelly ( 4 KM ), Nandanam ( 4 KM ), Ramachandrapur ( 4 KM ), Ghousenagar ( 5 KM ) are the nearby Villages to Thukkapur. Thukkapur is surrounded by Yadagirigutta Mandal towards North, Valigonda Mandal towards East, Bibinagar Mandal towards west, Pochampally Mandal towards South.

Bhongir, Jangaon, Hyderabad, Siddipet are the near by Cities to Thukkapur.

This Place is in the border of the Nalgonda District and Rangareddi District. Rangareddi District Keesara is west towards this place.

== Tukkapur 2011 Census Details ==
Thukkapur Local Language is Telugu. Tukkapur Village Total population is 1919 and number of houses are 498. Female Population is 48.9%. Village literacy rate is 51.0% and the Female Literacy rate is 18.8%.
