= Falaknuma–Bhongir (Bhuvanagiri) MEMU =

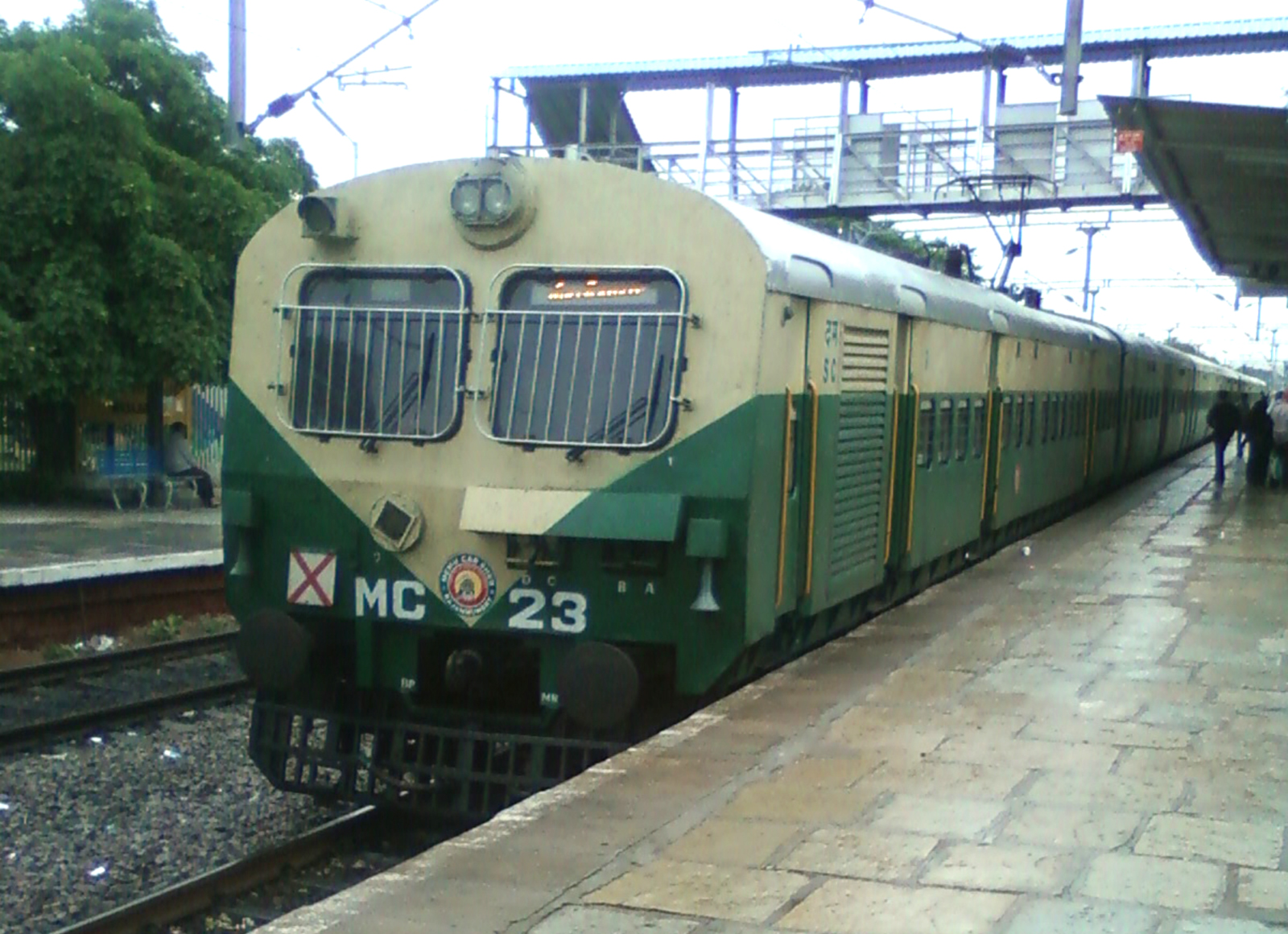
Falaknuma–Bhongir MEMU passenger train at Malkajgiri station

Falaknuma–Bhongir (Bhuvanagiri) MEMU is a MEMU passenger train running from Falaknuma in Hyderabad to Bhongir in Yadadri Bhuvanagiri district

The train runs two services from Falaknuma and Bhongir twice a day. The numbers are 67275 & 67276. Recently afternoon train extended up to Janagam.

Code Station Name Arrives

1FM Falaknuma 06:10(Starting Point)

2HPG Huppuguda 06:13

3YKA Yakutpura 06:17

4DQR Dabirpura 06:19

5MXT Malakpet 06:21

6KCG Kacheguda 06:26

7VAR Vidya Nagar 06:31

8JOO Jamai Osmania 06:33

9ATC Arts College 06:35

10STPD Sitafalmandi 06:38

11MJF Malkajgiri Junction 06:41

12CHZ Charlapalli 07:04

13GT Ghatkesar 07:19

14BN Bibinagar 07:29

15BG Bhongir 08:00(Arrival)
