= Pagidipalli =

- Village, Ward
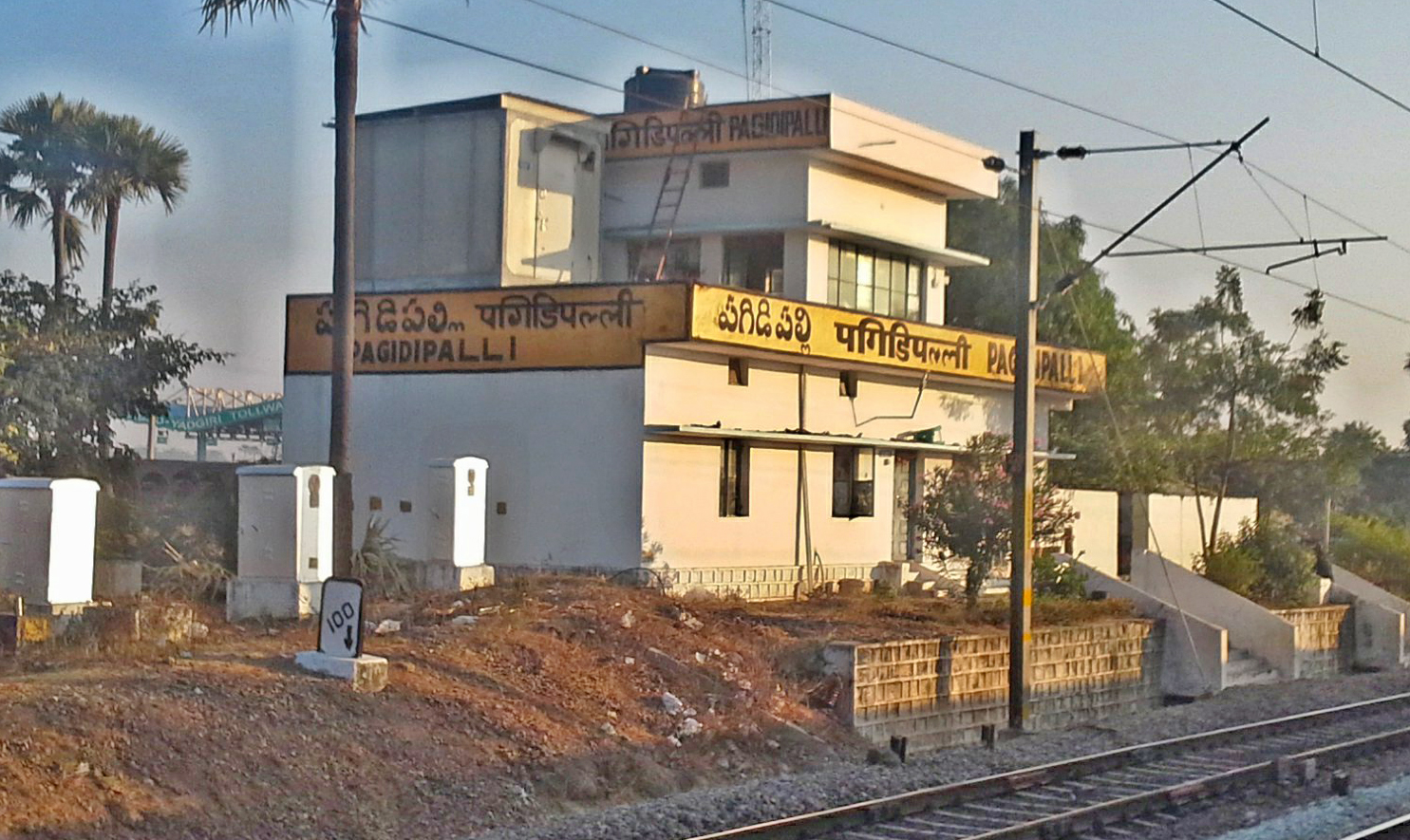
- Pagidipalli Railway station

- Location in Telangana, India Pagidipalli (India)
- Coordinates: 17.4937292°N 78.836064°E
- Country: India
- State: Telangana
- District: Yadadri Bhuvanagiri district

Languages
  - Official: Telugu
- Time zone: UTC+5:30 (IST)
- PIN: 508116
- Telephone code: 08720
- Vehicle registration: TS
- Nearest city: Hyderabad, Bhongir
- Lok Sabha constituency: Bhongiri
- Vidhan Sabha constituency: Bhongiri
- Website: telangana.gov.in

Pagidipalli is a village in Bhuvanagiri Mandal & Municipality of Yadadri Bhuvanagiri district of Telangana, India. It has a railway station named the Pagidipalli railway station.
