= Bommaipally =

- Village, Ward
- Location in Telangana, India Bommaipally (India)
- Coordinates: 17.4876918°N 78.863824°E
- Country: India
- State: Telangana
- District: Yadadri Bhuvanagiri district
- City: Bhongir Municipality

Languages
  - Official: Telugu
- Time zone: UTC+5:30 (IST)
- PIN: 508285
- Telephone code: 08720
- Vehicle registration: TG
- Nearest city: Hyderabad
- Lok Sabha constituency: Bhongiri
- Vidhan Sabha constituency: Bhongiri
- Website: telangana.gov.in

Bommaipally is a village in Yadadri Bhuvanagiri district of the Indian state of Telangana. It is administered under Bhuvanagiri Municipality & Mandal of Bhongir revenue division.
