= Sri Lakshmi Narasimha Swamy Temple, Yadagirigutta =

Hindu temple in Telangana, India

Sri Lakshmi Narasimha Swamy Temple
- 8th Nava Narasimha Temple
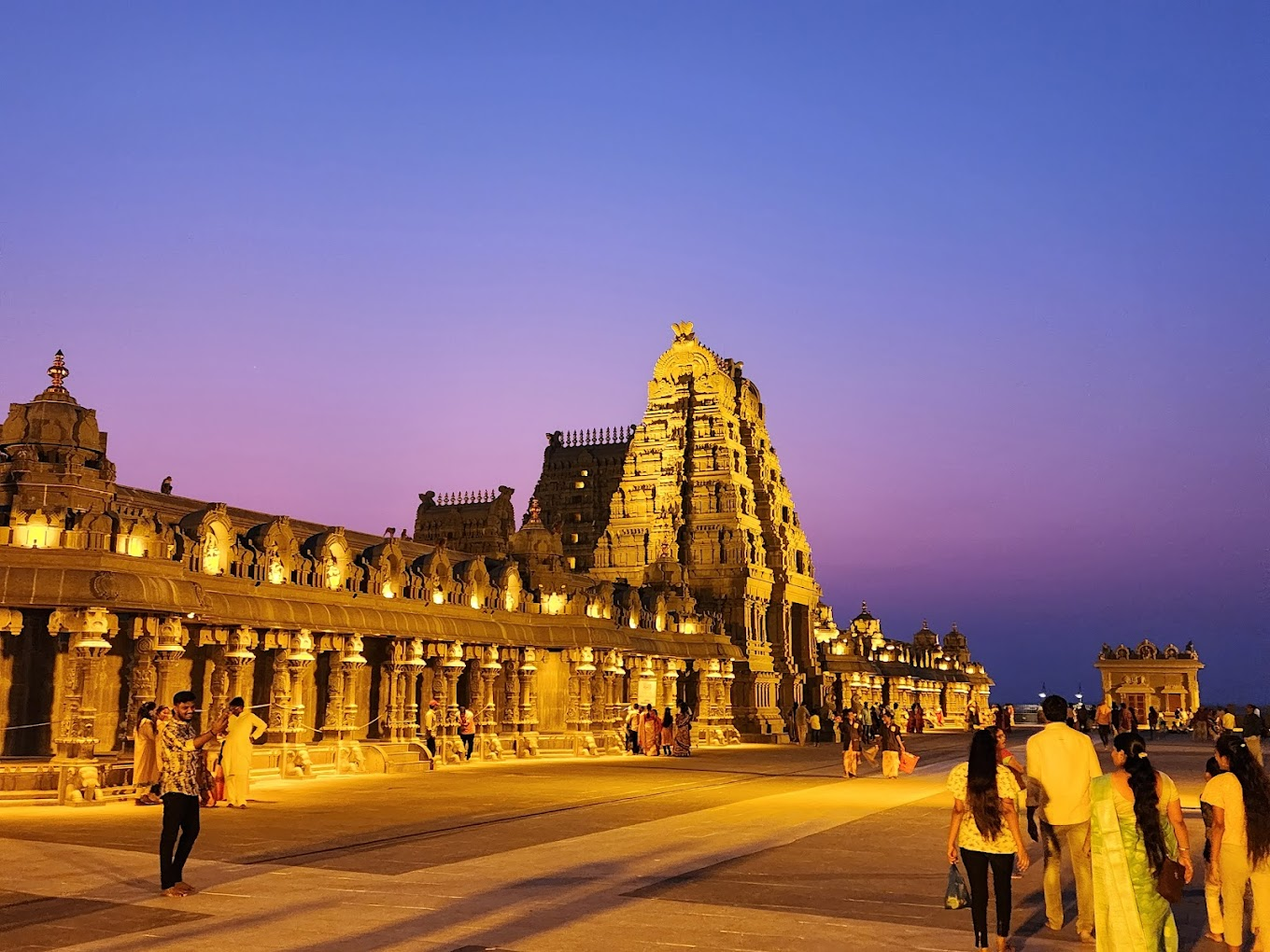
- Yadadri Temple on the hilltop.

- Location in Telangana Sri Lakshmi Narasimha Swamy Temple, Yadagirigutta (India)

Religion
- Affiliation: Hinduism
- District: Yadadri Bhuvanagiri
- Deity: Narasimha and Lakshmi

Location
- Location: Yadagirigutta
- State: Telangana
- Country: India
- Coordinates: 17.5892°N 78.9446°E

Architecture
- Type: Dravidian Architecture

Website
- https://yadagiriguttatemple.telangana.gov.in/

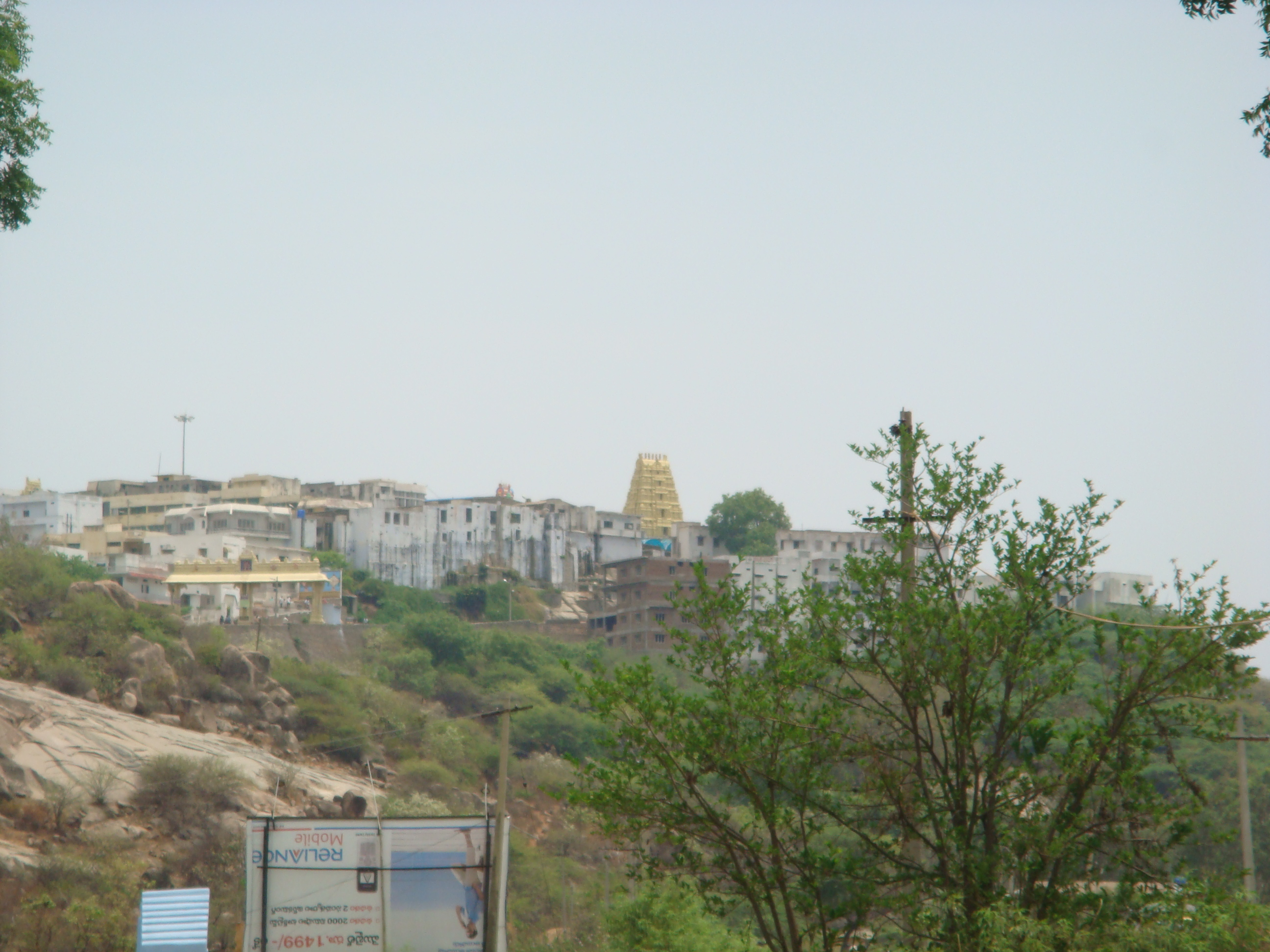
Hillock of Yadadri

The Sri Lakshmi Narasimha Swamy Temple or Yadadri or Yadagiri Gutta Devasthanam (YGD), or Pancha Narasimha Kshetram or Rishi Aradhana Kshetram is a Hindu Temple situated on a hillock in the small town of Yadagirigutta in the Yadadri Bhuvanagiri district of the Indian state of Telangana. Yadadri Temple is touted as Telangana's own Tirupati. The Temple is dedicated to the god Narasimha, an Avatar of Vishnu.

The temple was expanded and rebuilt between 2016 and March 2022. It is 65 km from Hyderabad.

== Temple Legend ==
According to the Skanda Purana, Yada, the son of the sage Rishyasringa performed penance here to the god Narasimha. Being pleased with his penance, Narasimha manifested himself in five forms: Jvala Narasimha, Gandabherunda Narasimha, Yogananda Narasimha, Ugra Narasimha, and Lakshmi Narasimha. Yada requested Narasimha to remain on the hill in these forms. For this reason, the temple has deities of Narasimha in all five forms enshrined in stone in the main cave. Historically, the temple has followed the Tenkalai tradition of the Vaishnava Agama Shastras as followed in South India.

== Deities in the Temple ==
The temple is in a cave about 3.7 metres (12 ft) high by 9.1 metres (30 ft) long, located in back of the temple hall, by the rear pillar. There is a stairway down into the chamber and then towards the back. Jvala Narasimha is in the shape of a serpent, while Yogananda Narasimha appears sitting in meditation in yoga pose. The silver icon of Lakshmi-Narasimha is installed in the main shrine. To the right of the temple main door is a Hanuman temple. There is a long horizontal gap in the rock just below Hanuman. This is said to be where Gandaberunda Narasimha manifested. It is said that any wish of a sincere devotee visiting this temple will be fulfilled. The sanctum sanctorum or garbhagriha is located in a cave, under a huge slating rock, which covers half the temple.

== New Yadadri Temple ==
A new temple was built at the old temple site. A temporary temple, Balalayam, was built till the renovation was on. The temple was rebuilt in the Krishna Sila (Black stone). The new temple was inaugurated on 28 March 2022 by Chief Minister of Telangana K. Chandrasekhar Rao.

=== Donations and Renovations ===
The then Chief Minister of Telangana, K. Chandrashekhar Rao initiated the renovation of the temple, and approved a final layout. A major renovation of the temple was completed with a budget of ₹1800 crores. The work started in 2016 and was completed in March 2022 by the Yadadri Temple Development Authority (YTDA). The temple owned 39 kilos of gold and 1,753 tonnes of silver for lining the gopurams and walls in the temple. The centuries-old practice of using lime mortar to join different stone parts is being used. The YTDA acquired around 770 hectares (1,900 acres) by spending ₹300 crores. The YTDA also constructed houses near the Vishnu Gundam (a bathhouse).

The Seventh Nizam of Hyderabad, Mir Osman Ali Khan during his rule, had passed a grant of Rs.82,825 to this temple.

In Feb 2023, on behalf of the Nizam family, Princess Esra, wife of the 8th Nizam, gifted jewellery worth 8 Lakh Rupees to the temple.

=== Sections ===
The sections of the temple include the main temple, Mukha Mandapam, seven gopurams (domes) with wooden roofs, vratha peetham, Swamy Vari Udyana Vanam, kalyana mandapam, satram etc. The pillars of 12 Alvars (the poet-saints of Sri Vaishnavism) in the main temple is a significant feature.

The temple entrance arch will depict Mahābhūta (the five elements). there is vishnu gundam. It is also proved that when we bath, all bad things are washed away from us.

=== Temple architecture ===
The architecture of the temple is based on Agama Shastra. The temple is built entirely in stone. The temple was earlier built on 0.81 hectares (2 acres). After demolishing all structures on the temple hillock, the base for the temple is now 6.5 hectares (16 acres).

=== Design ===
The principal film set designer is Anand Sai and lead architect P Madhusudhan, chosen for their understanding of the ancient designs based on silpa and Agama principles. The entire temple is built in stone. The stone designs in Yadadri were provided by the chief sthapathi of the temple, Sundararajan Srinivasan.

=== Sculptures ===
Three types of stones are being used for the temple like Krishna Sila (also known as Purusha Sila) for presiding deities in the sanctum sanctorum; Sthri Sila for deities of Goddesses; and Napunsaka Sila used for flooring, walls etc. Black granite stone is also used, based on the temple architecture of the Kakatiya dynasty in Telangana. The black granite stone has tiny pores, and it becomes strong and hard when milk, curd, oil and other liquids get into those pores, according to learned shilipis (sculpture experts).

== Transport ==
Yadagirigutta is well connected by both rail and road. It is about 55 km from Uppal, a major suburb of Hyderabad and 65 km from Mahatma Gandhi Bus Station at Hyderabad. A new bus stand is built on a 6.1 hectares (15 acres), as a part of new temple development. The proposed Hyderabad Regional Ring Road passes through Yadagirigutta.

The nearest railway stations are Raigiri about 5 km away and Bhongiri, a major town of Hyderabad Metropolitan Region about 13 km away. Raigir railway station has been renamed as Yadadri(YADD) by South Central Railway in line with the new nomenclature of the temple town. The Hyderabad MMTS - Phase II is planned, to be extended from Ghatkesar to Raigir station, which is 5 km from Yadagirigutta. A metro train is proposed between Uppal and Yadagirigutta.

== See also ==
- Tirumala Venkateswara Temple
- Sri Raja Rajeshwara Temple, Vemulawada
- Ramappa Temple
