= Bhongir railway station =

Railway station in Telangana, India

Bhongir Bhuvanagiri
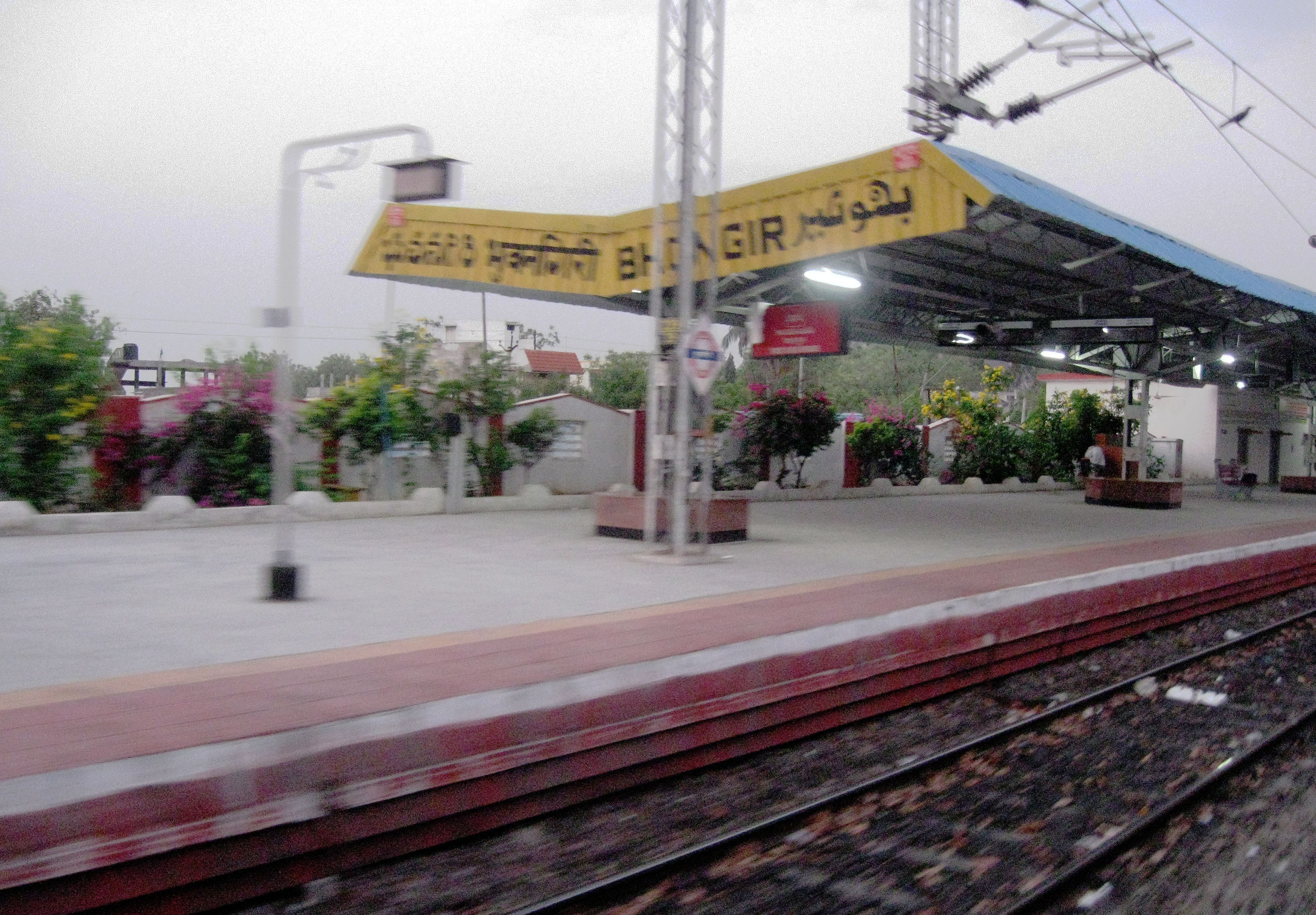
- Platforms at Bhuvanagiri (Bhongir) station

General information
- Location: Hyderabad-Bhuvanagiri-Warangal Highway Road (NH-163), Telangana; India
- Coordinates: 17.5246°N 78.8991°E
- System: Indian Railways station
- Platforms: 3
- Tracks: 4

Construction
- Structure type: Standard (on ground station)

Other information
- Status: Active
- Station code: BG
- Zone(s): South Central Railway
- Division(s): Secunderabad

Passengers
- 2,000 (daily)
Location
- Location within Telangana Location within India

Bhongir railway station also known as Bhuvanagiri (station code:BG) is a railway station in Bhongir, Yadadri Bhuvanagiri on Secunderabad–Kazipet line.

== Services ==
MEMU service starts from Bhongir railway station to Falaknuma railway station.

- Falaknuma–Bhongir MEMU
