= Raigiri =

- Village, Ward
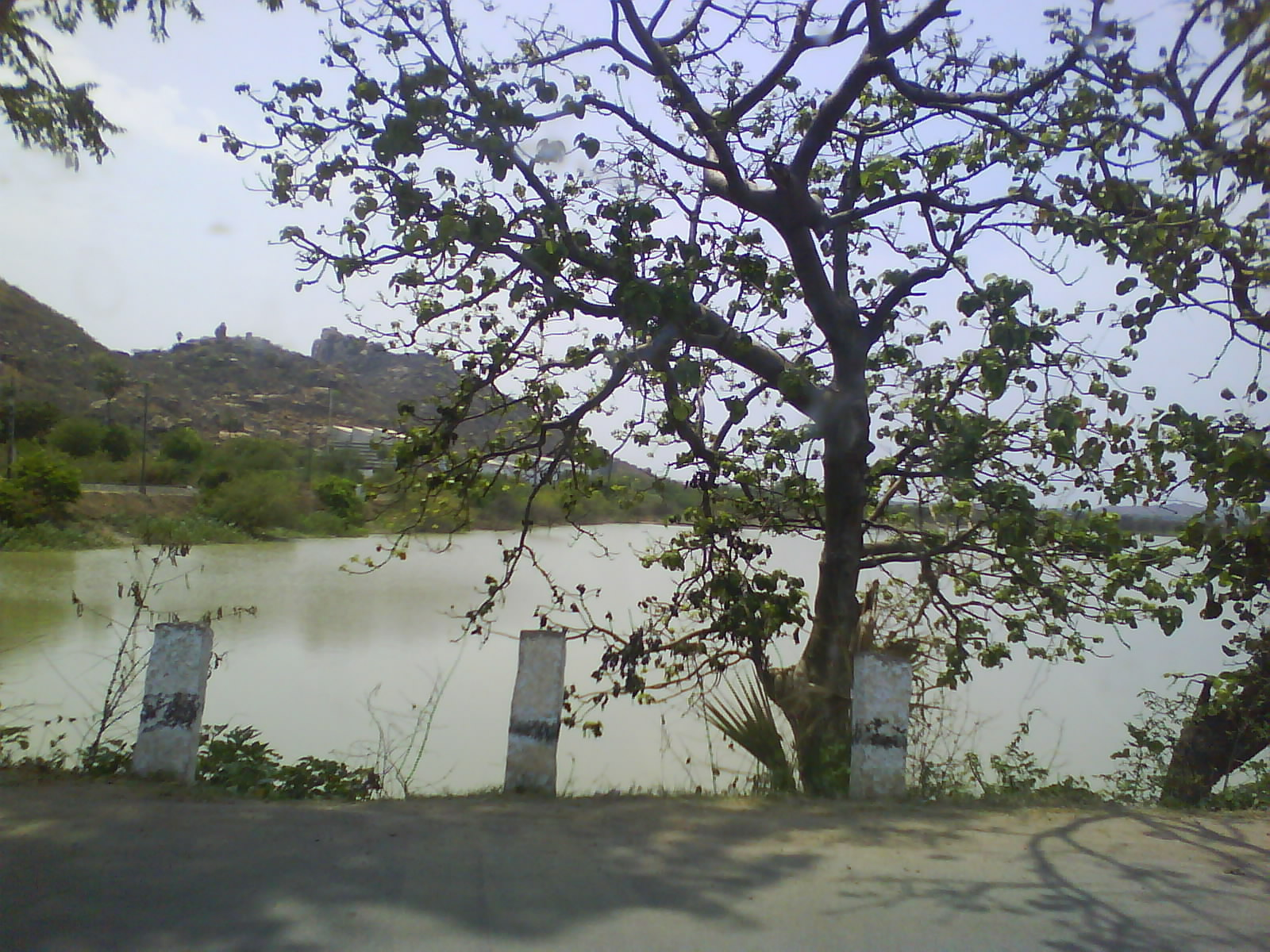
- Lake near the Raigiri

- Location in Telangana, India Raigiri (India)
- Coordinates: 17.5342°N 78.9403°E
- Country: India
- State: Telangana
- District: Yadadri Bhuvanagiri
- City: Bhongir Municipality
- Elevation: 400 m (1,300 ft)

Languages
  - Official: Telugu
- Time zone: UTC+5:30 (IST)
- PIN: 508116
- Vehicle registration: TS 30
- Nearest city: Bhongir
- Lok Sabha constituency: Bhongir
- Vidhan Sabha constituency: Bhongir
- Climate: hot (Köppen)
- Website: telangana.gov.in

Raigiri is a village of Bhuvanagiri mandal and also falls under Bhongir Municipality in Yadadri Bhuvanagiri district in the state of Telangana, India.

There is a railway station in this village between Secunderabad, Bhuvanagiri and Kazipet, Warangal under South Central Railway. This is the nearest station to reach the famous pilgrimage place Yadadri temple and Bhuvanagiri fort

== Gallery ==
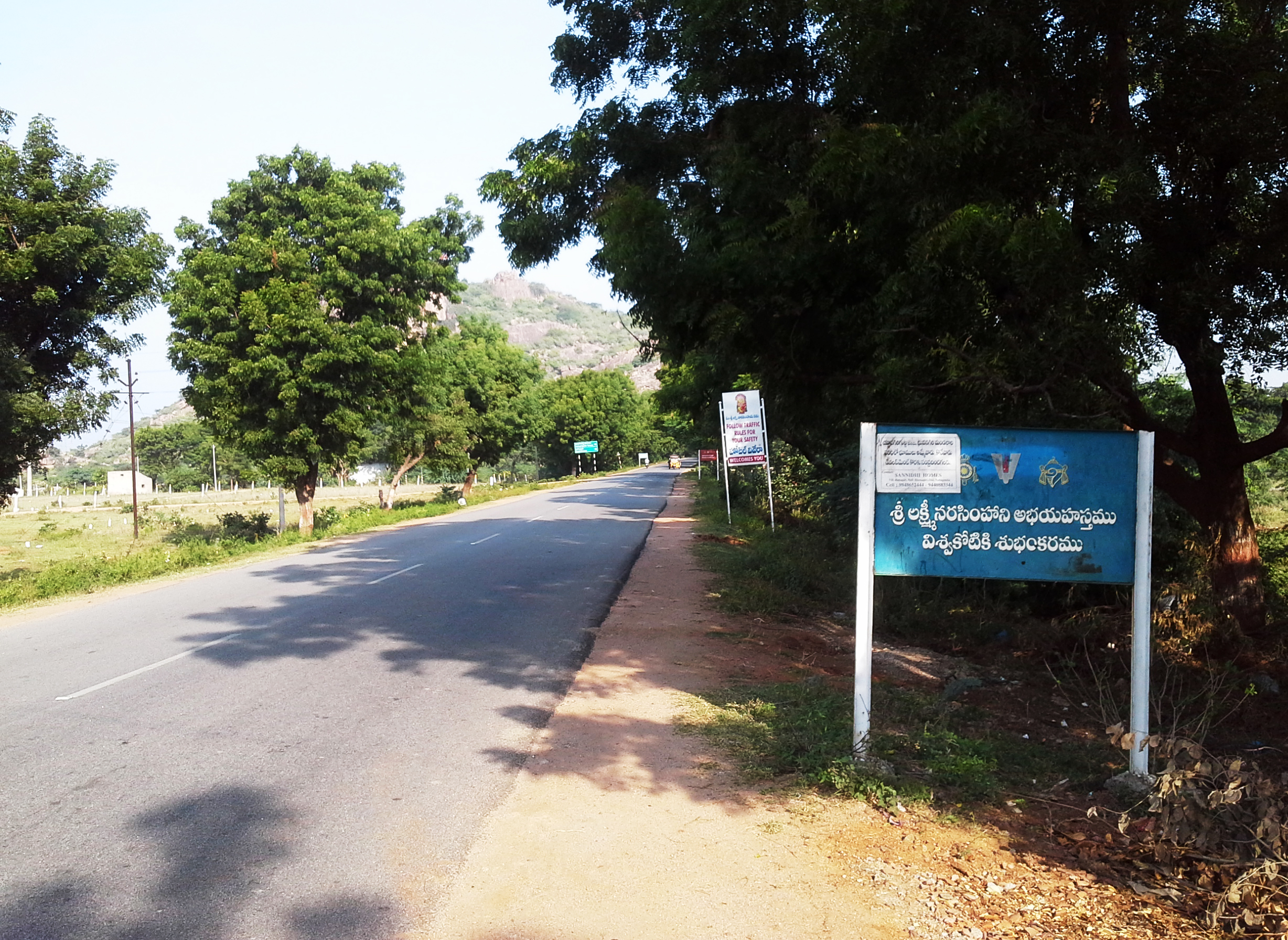
Route from Raigir to Yadadri temple

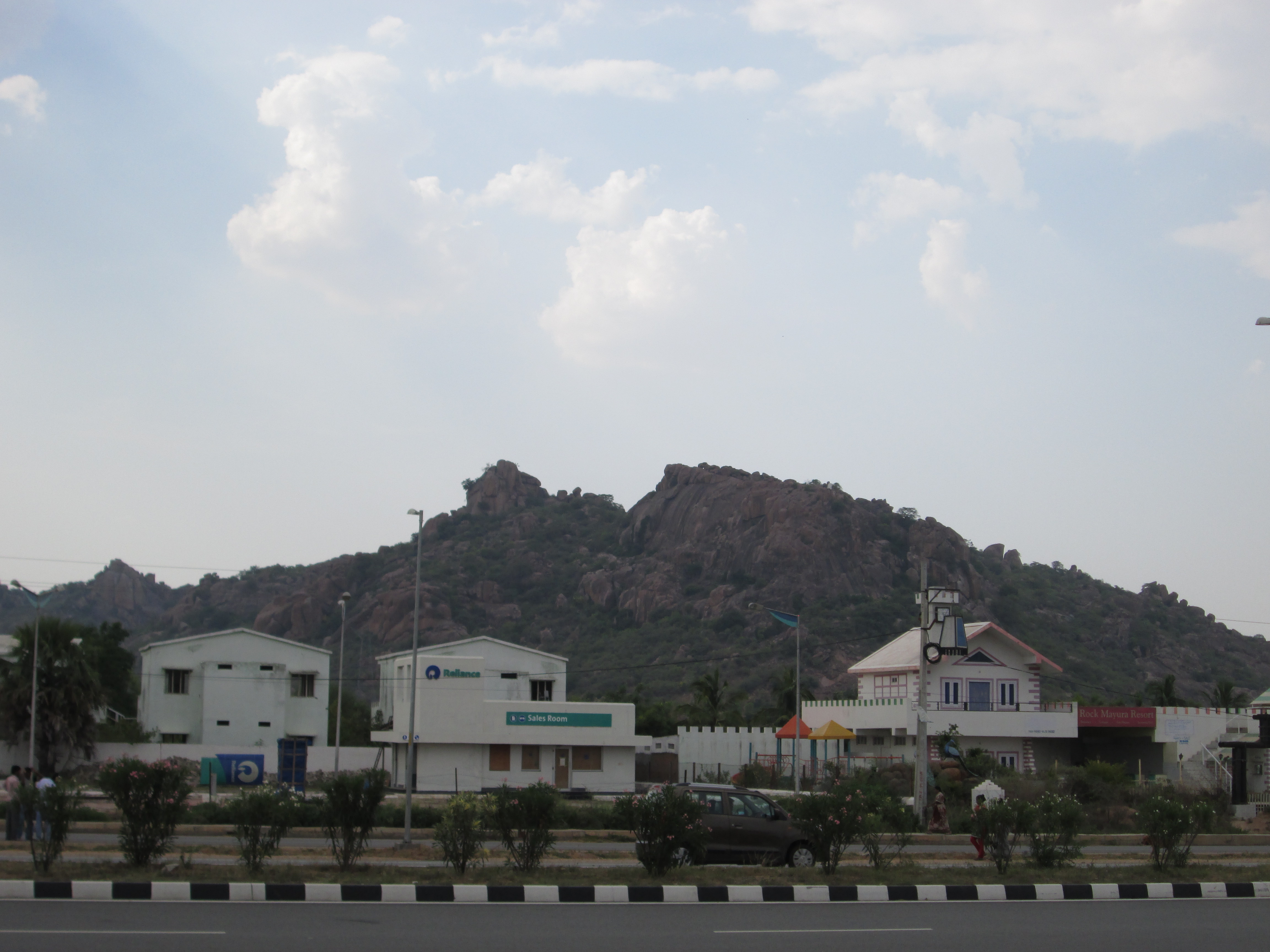
Reliance Petrol bunk in Raigiri
