= Bhongir Fort =

11th century fort in Telangana, India

Coordinates: 17°30′56.5″N 78°53′33.6″E

- భువనగిరి కోట (Telugu)
- Bhuvanagiri Fort
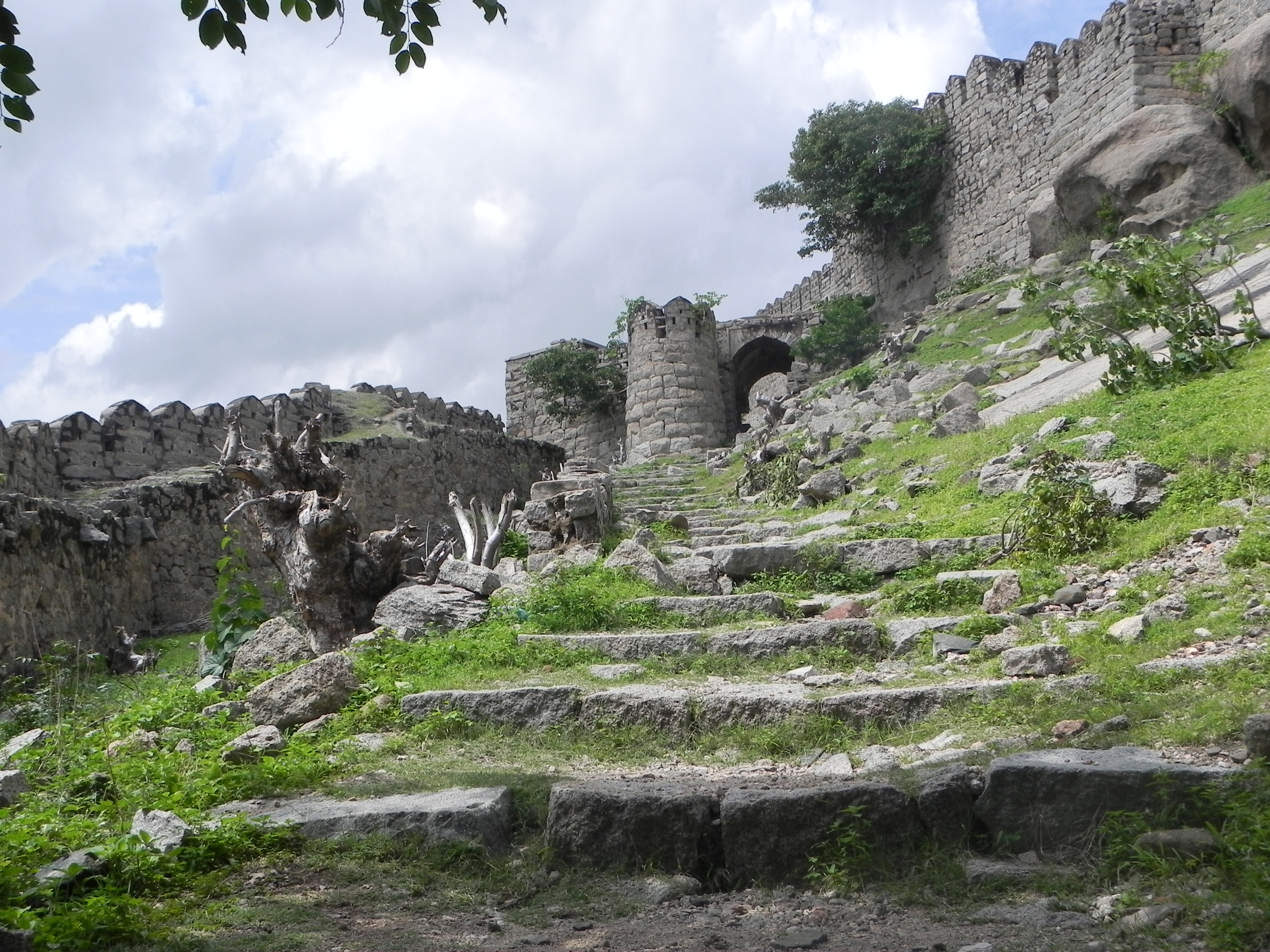

- Location within Telangana Location within India
- Interactive map of Bhongir Fort
- Type: Fort
- Etymology: Tribhuvanagiri
- Location: Bhongir
- Nearest city: Hyderabad

History
- Founder: Tribhu-vanamalla Vikramaditya-VI
- Built: 1076 AD
- Built for: Tribhuvanamalla Vikramaditya VI

Site notes
- Restored by: Musunuri Nayaks; Bahamani Sultans; Qutub Shahis
- Current use: Tourism
- Governing body: Archaeological Survey of India
- Owner: Archaeological Survey of India

Bhongir Fort, also known as Bhuvanagiri Fort, is a fort located in the heart of Bhongir a town in Yadadri Bhuvanagiri district, Telangana, India. It is located on a huge rock at a commanding height. 47 km from Hyderabad.

== History ==
Bhuvanagiri Fort is in Yadadri-Bhuvanagiri District it was built in the 10th century on an isolated monolithic rock by the Western Chalukya ruler Tribhuvanamalla Vikramaditya VI and was thus named after him as Tribhuvanagiri.This name gradually became Bhuvanagiri and subsequently Bhongir. At the foot of the fortified rocks 609.6 meters above the sea levels stands the town of Bhuvanagiri, the fort was considered practically impregnable by invading armies. The fort is associated with the rule of Queen Rudramadevi and her grandson Prataparudra II

Bhuvanagiri Fort is one of the most prominent places in the Yadadri Bhuvanagiri District. In the 10th century the cities of Bhuvanagiri Durgam and Bhuvanagiri existed. As king of the Chalukya dynasty, Rajayagiri was looking for a fort on the Mallanna Gutta. Impressed by the beauty of the mountain, King Rajagiri built a khilla (Quila) at the fort. When King Inamuliku gave Bonaiyah, who had shown a wonderful place he gently rejected them and requested that his name and the name of his wife Giramma built together. Legend has it that the city the king built on their names is today cultured in Bhuvanagiri. Bhuvanagiri fort was long time ruled by Qutub Shahi. Later, when the Mughals invaded Golconda in 1687, they came to power. Sarvai Papanna who was born in Telangana to a common kalu Geetha family won the Orugallu in 1708 and later took over Bhuvanagiri. Bhuvanagiri fort is an ancient monument built on a monolithic rock fortress, about 47 km from the city of Hyderabad. The hill is 184.5m high from road level it is one of the highest mountains in Deccan plateau. The mountain is an oval monolithic mountain and from the south it looks like a tortoise and a sleeping elephant from the western side travelling on the NH163. Bhuvanagiri fort is said to have been built during the reign of Mugla Vikramaditya, the 6th triangular dynasty of the western Chalukya dynasty. It is named after him as the Bhuvanagiri fort. The hill has southbound and south-eastern passageways. The current route starts from the southwest. Bhuvanagiri Fort is the first steel gateway. It is said that the Nizam built it at his own expense. The entrance resembles that of Fateh Darwaza, the first gate of Balahisar in Golconda Fort. Tall walls and spacious rooms are visible in the architecture. There is also a local perception of the Hillock in Bhuvanagiri that it resembles a sleeping elephant.

== The Fort ==
Bhuvangiri Fort sits on an egg-shaped rock hill which is more than 500 feet high. The steps from the bottom of the hill to the top are still intact; at the beginning of the steps there is a Hanuman Temple with two entry points protected by huge rocks, so the fort was considered practically impregnable by invading armies. A moat that encircles the fort, a vast underground chamber, trap doors, an armoury, stables, ponds, wells, etc., adds to the scenic view. The fort is associated with the rule of the queen Rudramadevi. The Bala Hisar or citadel on the top of the hill gives a bird's eye view. According to rumours, there once was an underground corridor connecting Bhuvangiri Fort to Golconda Fort, though no credible source confirms this. There is a statue placed at entry of the fort which came out in nearby diggings around fort. It is a popular trekking spot.

== Nearest Cities ==
- Hyderabad-49 km
- Nalgonda-70 km
- Warangal-99 km
- Suryapet-106 km
- Khammam-164 km
- Nizamabad-181 km

== See also ==
- Kakatiyas
- Warangal Fort
- Golconda Fort
