= Bhongir Municipal Corporation =

Local civic body in Bhuvanagiri, Telangana, India

Bhongir Municipality also known as Bhuvanagiri Municipality is a municipality in the Yadadri Bhuvanagiri district of the Telangana state of India. The municipality comprises 35 wards.

Bhongir Municipality is the 4th oldest municipality (in 1930) in Telangana after Hyderabad (1869), Warangal (1899), Khammam( 1910).

In 2000 elections, TDP formed the municipality and Penta Narsimha (28/03/2000 to 28/03/2005) served as chairman for the house. He was elected through the direct election by the people. In 2007 elections, Congress formed the municipality and Donakonda Vanitha (2007–2009), Barre Jhangir (2009–2011) served as chairmen for the house. In 2014 Elections BJP wWon - 8 Seats, TDP- 7 Seats, Congress - 7 Seats, Independents - 6 Seats, CPM - 1 Seat. In 2019 Elections TRS formed the municipality(Currently)
