= Bhongir =

Settlement in India

Bhongir భువనగిరి Bhuvanagiri भुवनगिरि
- City
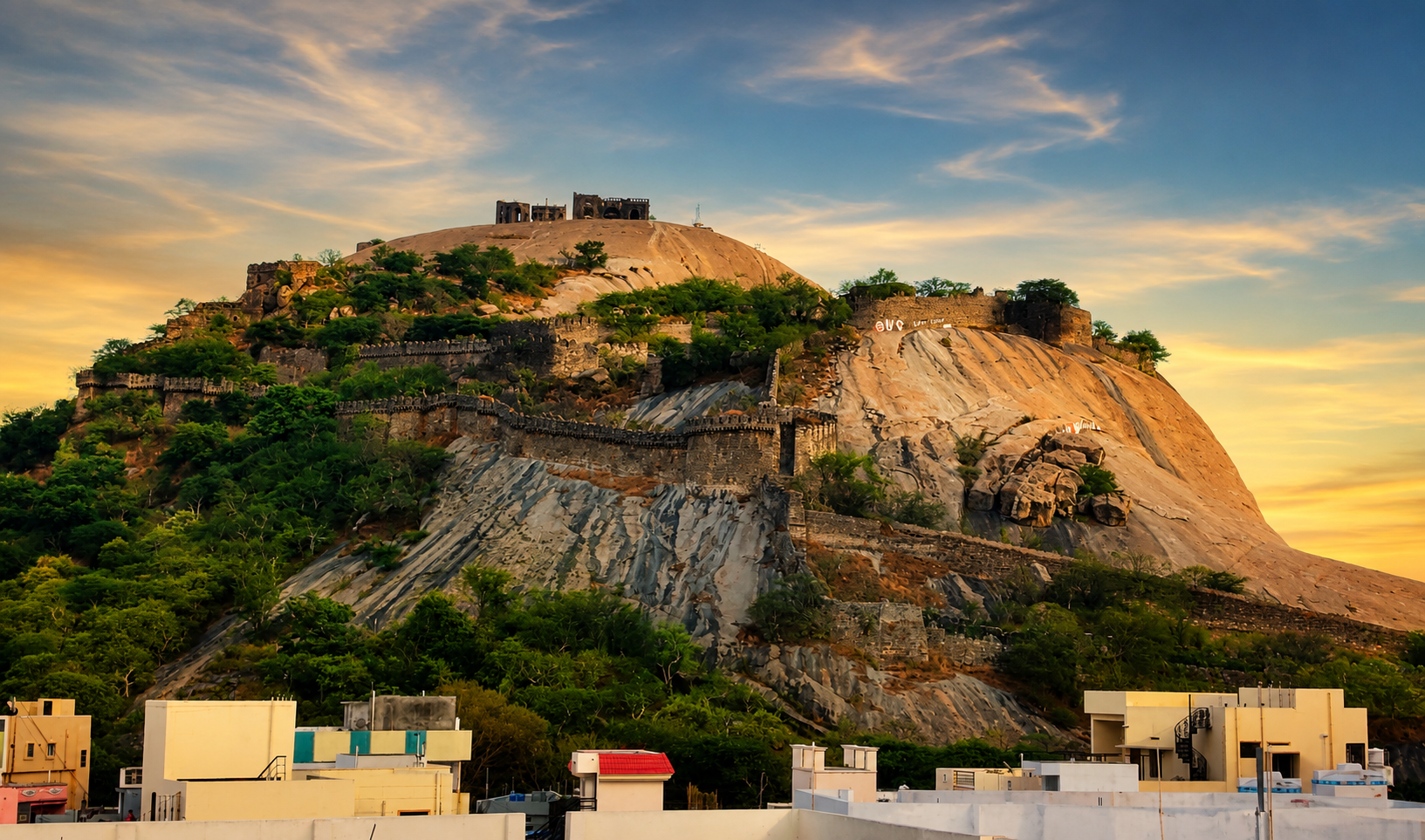
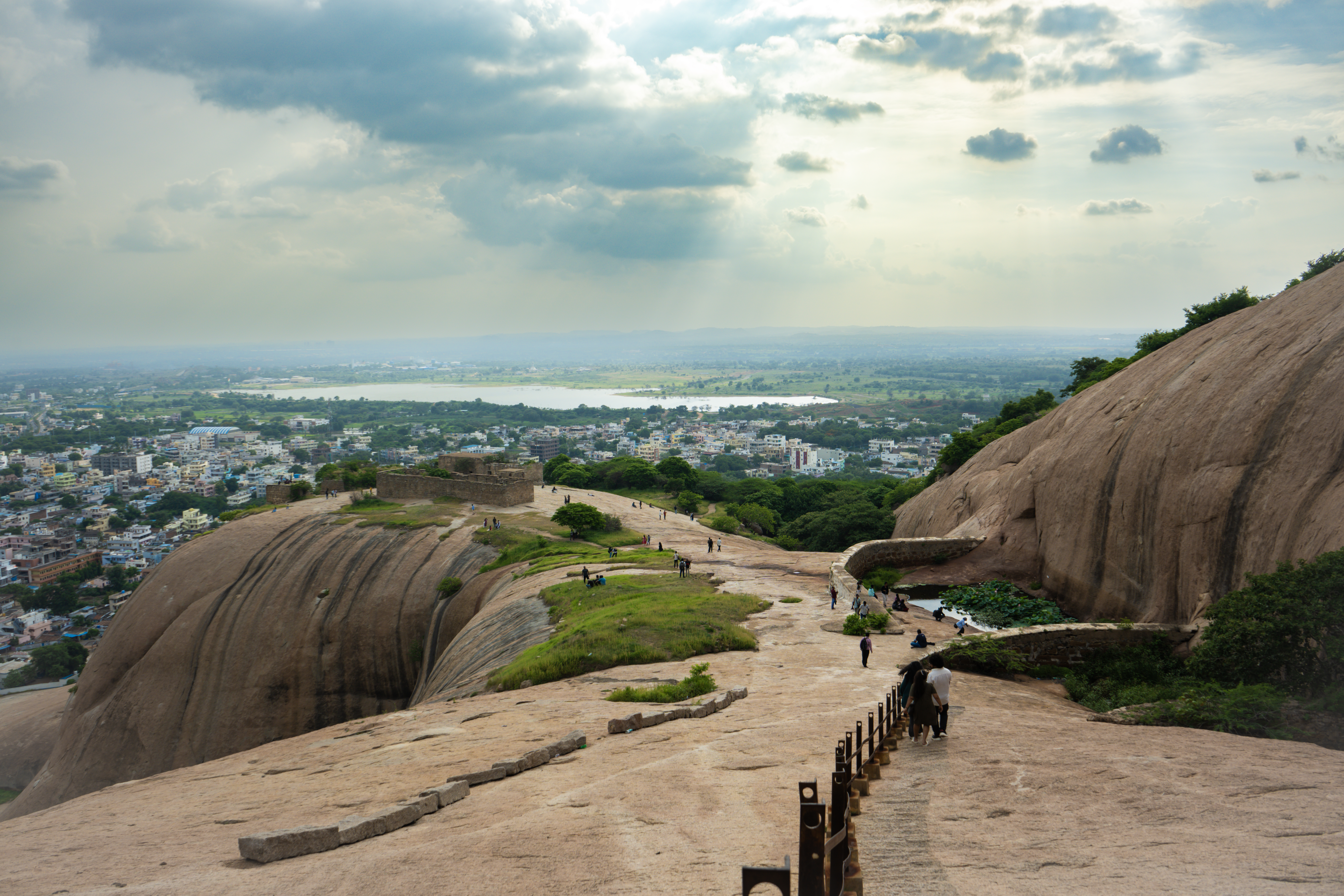
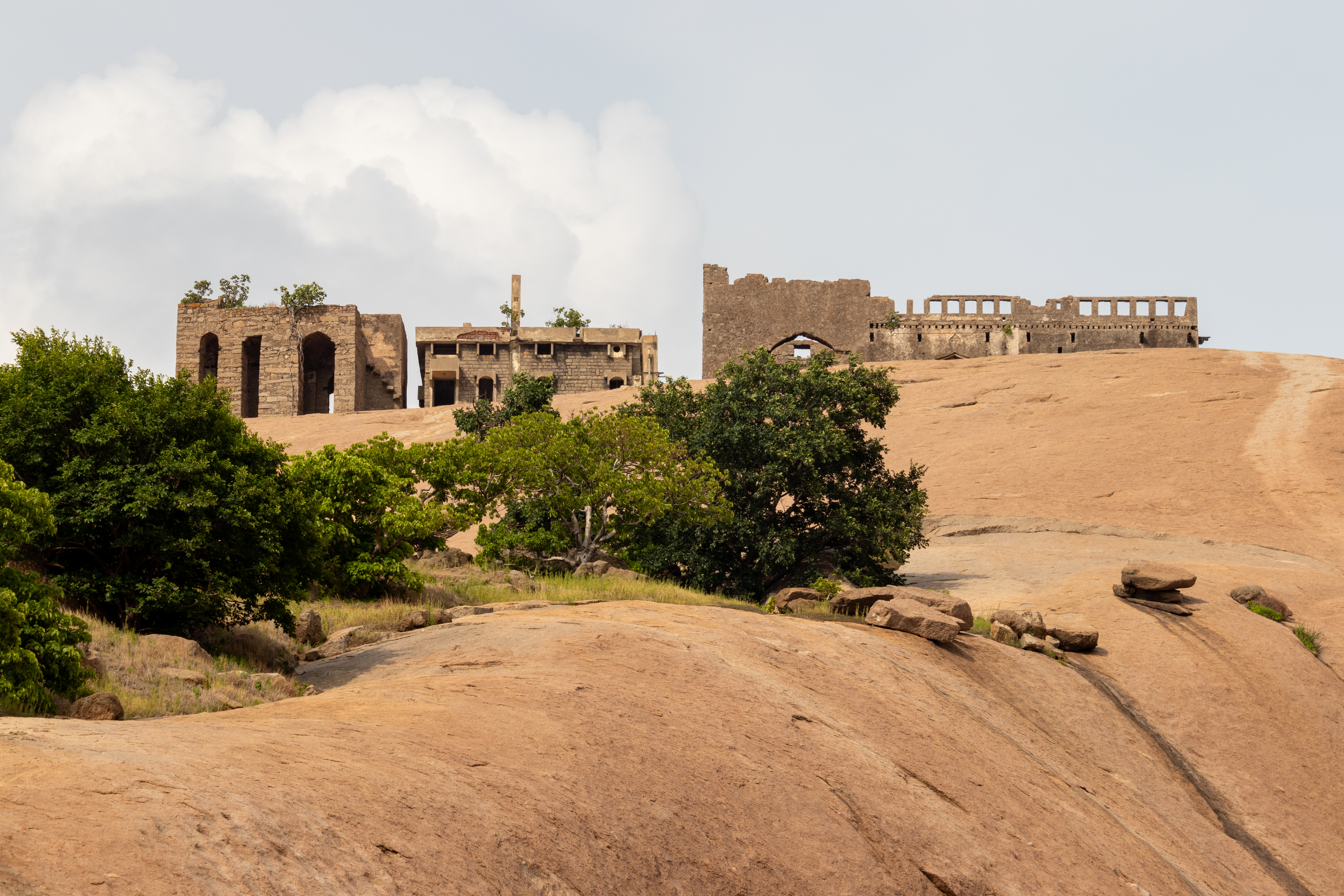
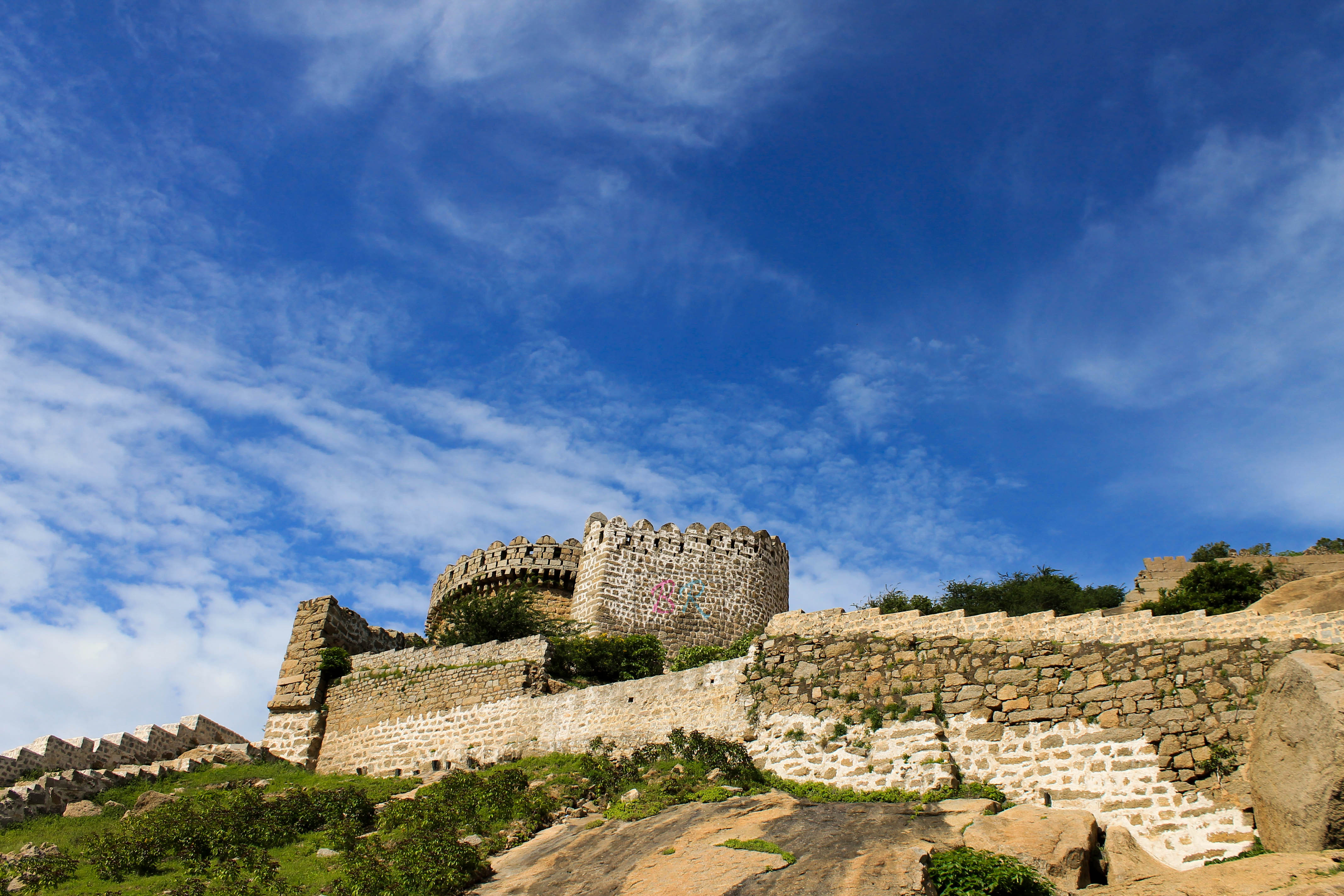
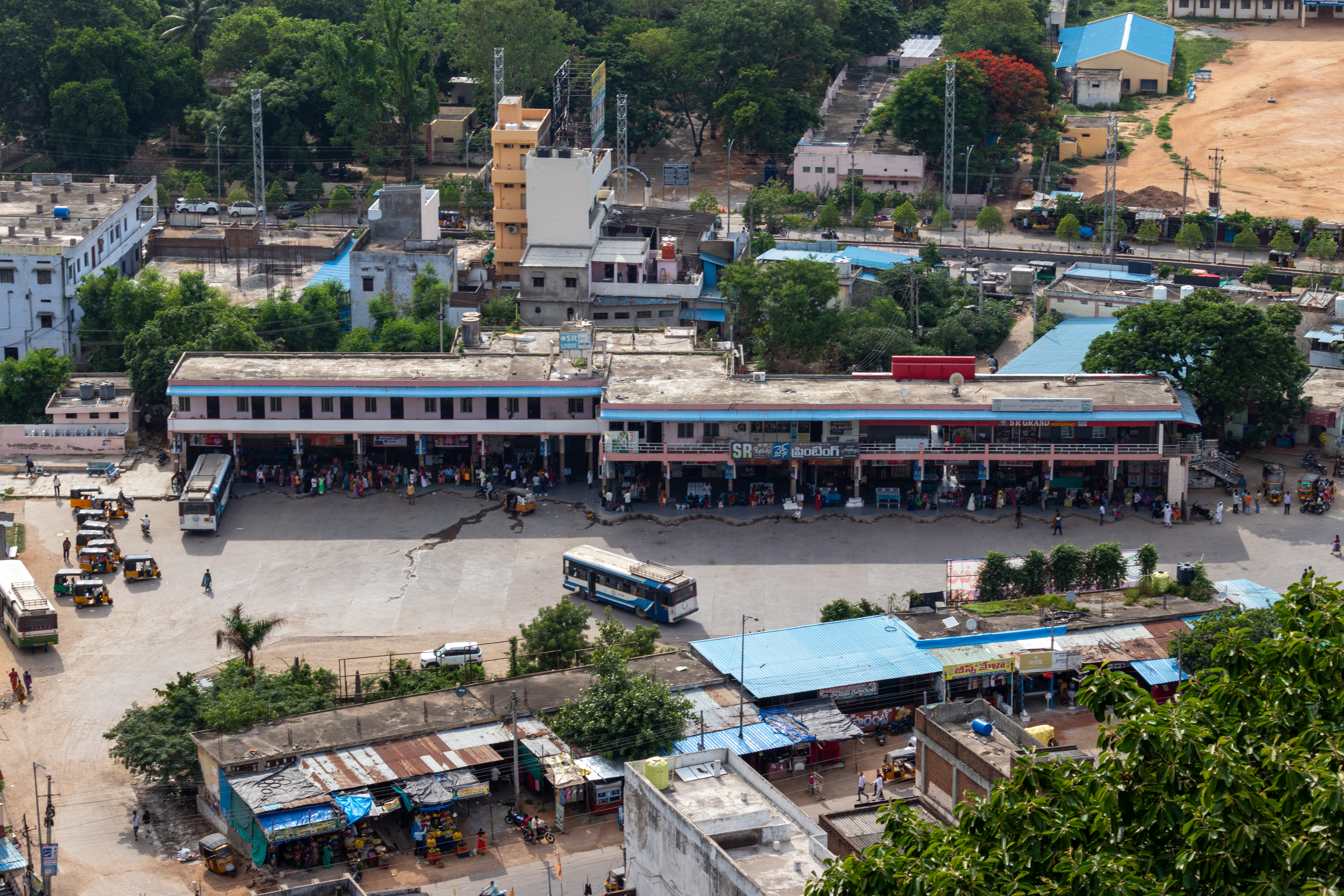
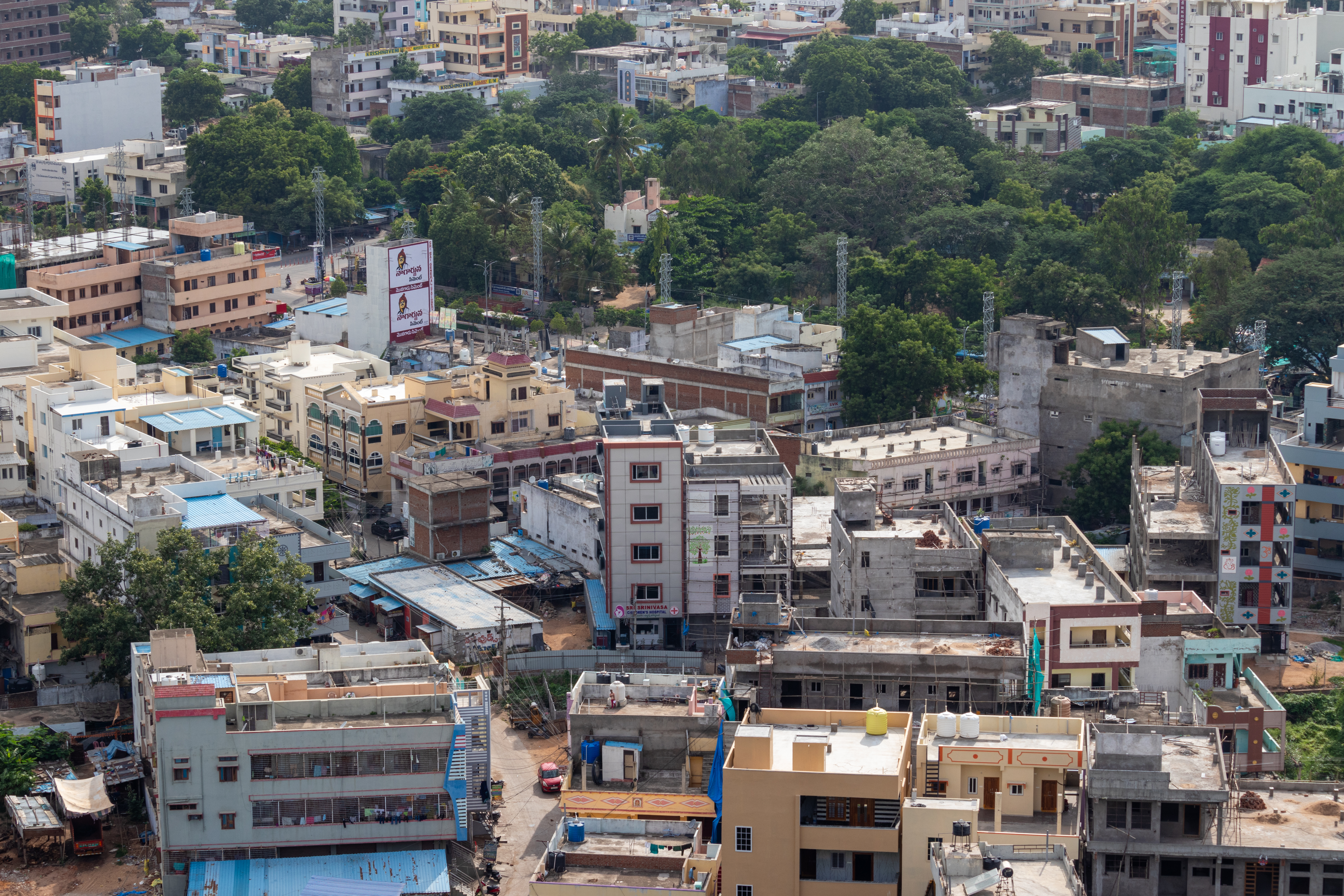
- Clockwise from top: Bhongir/Bhuvanagiri Fort, other Views of Fort, Bus Station, and City View from the fort
- Nickname: Bhuvanagiri
- Bhongir(Bhuvanagiri) in Telangana Bhongir(Bhuvanagiri), Telangana in India Bhongir(Bhuvanagiri), India in Asia Bhongir(Bhuvanagiri), India in World
- Coordinates: 17.51°N 78.89°E
- Country: India
- State: Telangana
- District: Yadadri Bhuvanagiri district
- District HQ: Bhongir, Telangana
- Metropolitan: Hyderabad Metropolitan Region
- Founded: 11 Century
- Named for: Tribhuvana Malla Vikramaditya VI (King of Fort)

Government
  - Type: Municipal Council
  - Body: Bhongir Municipality(4th Oldest in T.S)
  - MLA Bhongir-94: Kumbam Anil Kumar Reddy (2023-Present)-Congress
  - MP Bhongir-14: Chamala Kiran Kumar Reddy(2024-Present)-Congress

Area
  - Total: 76.537 km^{2} (29.551 sq mi)
- Elevation: 430 m (1,410 ft)

Population (2011)
  - Total: 53,339
  - Rank: 35th in Telangana
  - Density: 696.90/km^{2} (1,805.0/sq mi)
- Demonym: Bhongir wala

Languages
  - Official: Telugu, English
- Time zone: UTC+5:30 (IST)
- PIN: 508116, 508117
- Area codes: +91-08685
- Vehicle registration: TG-30 (previously TS-30(2017-2024), TS-05(2014-2017) and AP-24(Before 2014)
- Website: bhongirmunicipality.telangana.gov.in

Bhongir, also known as Bhuvanagiri, is a city and a district headquarters of the Yadadri Bhuvanagiri district and part of the Hyderabad Metropolitan Region of the Indian state of Telangana.

== History ==
Bhongir Fort is in Yadadri-Bhuvanagiri District it was built in the 10th century on an isolated monolithic rock by the Western Chalukya ruler Tribhuvanamalla Vikramaditya VI and was thus named after him as Tribhuvanagiri.This name gradually became Bhuvanagiri and subsequently Bhongir. At the foot of the fortified rocks 609.6 meters above the sea levels stands the town of Bhongir, the fort was considered practically impregnable by invading armies. The fort is associated with the rule of Queen Rudramadevi and her grandson Prataparudra II

Bhongir Fort is one of the most prominent places in the Yadadri Bhuvanagiri District. In the 10th century the cities of Bhuvanagiri Durgam and Bhuvanagiri existed. As king of the Chalukya dynasty, Rajayagiri was looking for a fort on the Mallanna Gutta. Impressed by the beauty of the mountain, King Rajagiri built a khilla (Quila) at the fort. When King Inamuliku gave Bonaiyah, who had shown a wonderful place he gently rejected them and requested that his name and the name of his wife Giramma built together. Legend has it that the city the king built on their names is today cultured in Bhuvanagiri. Bhuvanagiri fort was long time ruled by Qutub Shahi. Later, when the Mughals invaded Golconda in 1687, they came to power. Sarvai Papanna who was born in Telangana to a common kalu Geetha family won the Orugallu in 1708 and later took over Bhuvanagiri. Bhongir fort is an ancient monument built on a monolithic rock fortress, about 47 km from the city of Hyderabad. The hill is 184.5m high from road level it is one of the highest mountains in Deccan plateau. The mountain is an oval monolithic mountain and from the south it looks like a tortoise and a sleeping elephant from the western side travelling on the NH163. Bhuvanagiri fort is said to have been built during the reign of Mugla Vikramaditya, the 6th triangular dynasty of the western Chalukya dynasty. It is named after him as the Bhuvanagiri fort. The hill has southbound and south-eastern passageways. The current route starts from the southwest. Bhuvanagiri Fort is the first steel gateway. It is said that the Nizam built it at his own expense. The entrance resembles that of Fateh Darwaza, the first gate of Balahisar in Golconda Fort. Tall walls and spacious rooms are visible in the architecture. There is also a local perception of the Hillock in Bhongir that it resembles a sleeping elephant.

== Administration ==
The town was constituted as a city Municipality in the year 1910 (fourth oldest in Telangana). Subsequently, it constituted a Municipality in the year 1952, and recently as per the Government orders 3 gram panchayats namely Raigiri (North East), Pagidipalli (West) & Bommaipally (South) have been merged in Bhongir Municipality and town having spread over 76.537 km^{2}. The famous Lord Yadadri Lakshmi Narasimha Swamy Temple is located at 13 km from Bhongir.

Bhongir Lok Sabha constituency came into existence in 2008 as per the Delimitation Act of 2002.

- Chamala Kiran Kumar Reddy is the present MP
- Kumbam Anil Kumar Reddy -Indian National Congress is the present MLA

== Geography ==
Bhongir is located at 17.5108°N 78.8889°E. It has an average elevation of 329 metres (1,079 ft).

== Demographics ==
As of 2011 India census, Bhongir had a population of 53,339. Males constitute 51% of the population and females 49%. Bhongir has an average literacy rate of 70%, less than the national average of 74.04%; with male literacy of 78% and female literacy of 61%. 12% of the population is under 6 years of age.

As of 2012/2022 India. Bhongir Mandal population in 2022 is 132,529. According to the 2011 census of India, the Total Bhongir population is 103,538 people living in this Mandal, of which 52,720 are male and 50,818 are female. The population of Bhongir in 2021 is 128,387 Literate people are 66,957 out of 38,396 are male and 28,561 are female. Total workers are 44,778 depending on multi-skills out of which 28,234 are men and 16,544 are women. A total of 5,476 Cultivators are dependent on agriculture farming out of 3,577 are cultivated by men and 1,899 are women. 9,474 people work in agricultural land as labour in Bhongir, men are 3,775 and 5,699 are women.

== Transport ==
=== Airports ===
- Nearest Airport: RGIA Hyderabad(Shamshabad)

=== Rail Connectivity ===
The Railway Line comes under the South Central Railway & Secunderabad Division

- Nearest Railway Station: Bhongir railway station - 2.5 km -(Proposed MMTS Railway extension up to Yadadri Bhuvanagiri District)
- Nearest Railway Division(All Trains): Secunderabad railway division-47 km, Charlapalli railway station-34 km
- Nearest MMTS Railway Station: Ghatkesar railway station -23 km
- Nearest Metro Railway Station: Uppal metro station-38 km

Infrastructure development undertaken by MoR proposing a new railway line for construction of MMTS Phase II project up to Yadadri(Raigir) & Bhongir railway station for 33 km with an estimated cost of 412 crores proposed for construction.

=== Road Connectivity ===
- Nearest Bus station: Bhuvanagiri. It is owned by the Telangana State Road Transport Corporation (TGSRTC)
- Bhongir is well connected through NH163. Surrounded mandals and villages through state highways and primary roads.
- The major Urban centres are connecting via Bhongir is Nalgonda, Suryapet, Warangal, Siddipet are within the 100 km. Bhongir is well connected to other parts of the Districts in Telangana and Neighbourhood States with extensive rail and road connectivity.
- There are regular buses from JBS Secunderabad located within the 47 km from Bhongir Destination and MGBS Hyderabad located 48 km from Bhuvanagiri Destination, it is well connected from other major cities of the country to Bhuvanagiri District.
- Auto facilities are available from the Bhongir Bus Station to Bhongir Fort is connects from the Primary Roads from NH163.

== Economy ==
=== Theatres ===
There are five movie theatres in Bhongir, including the following: Currently, after Covid, Only two of them are running in Bhongir Town.

- Vasundhara Theatre
- Bhadradri Theatre
- Omkar h 70mm A/c (closed)
- KJR Theatre(Bharat Theatre-Closed)
- Neelagiri (Closed)
- Nearest Multiplex Theatre and Shopping mall are at MJR Asian Cine Square, Narapally, Hyderabad is around 25 km.

== Notable Persons ==
Notable persons from the town are Raavi Narayana Reddy, Alimineti Madhava Reddy, Belli Lalitha, and Pratyusha

== Education ==
=== Rock Climbing School (RCSB) ===
Rock Climbing School at Bhongir Fort is the training centre for rock climbing.
