= Alair Assembly constituency =

Constituency of the Telangana legislative assembly in India

Coordinates: 17.64°N 79.04°E

Alair
- Constituency No. 97 for the Telangana Legislative Assembly
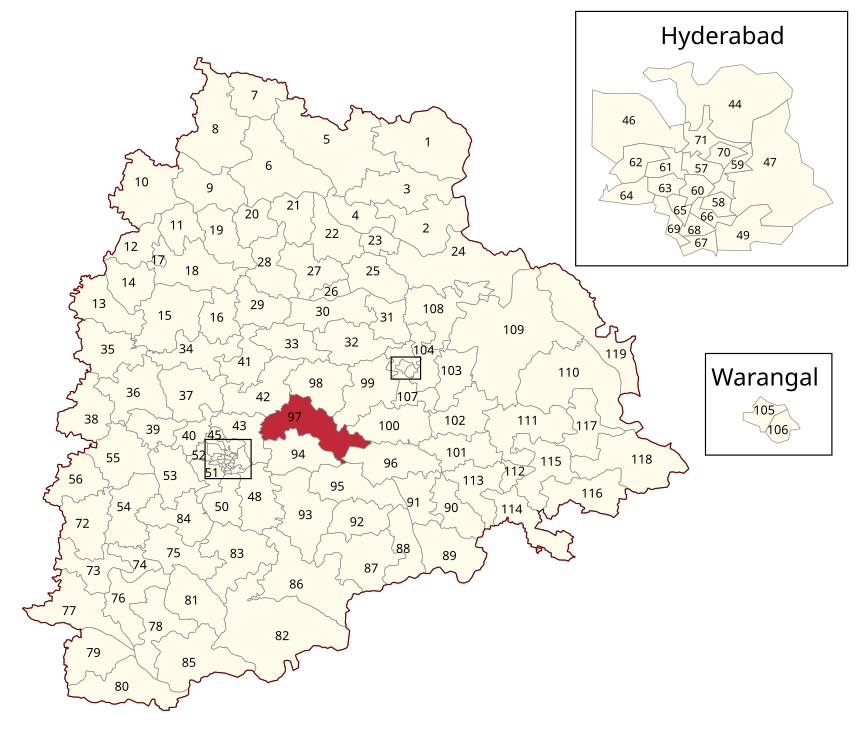
- Location of Alair Assembly constituency within Telangana

Constituency details
- Country: India
- Region: South India
- State: Telangana
- District: Yadadri Bhuvanagiri
- Lok Sabha constituency: Bhongir
- Established: 1951
- Total electors: 2,02,985
- Reservation: None

Member of Legislative Assembly
- 3rd Telangana Legislative Assembly
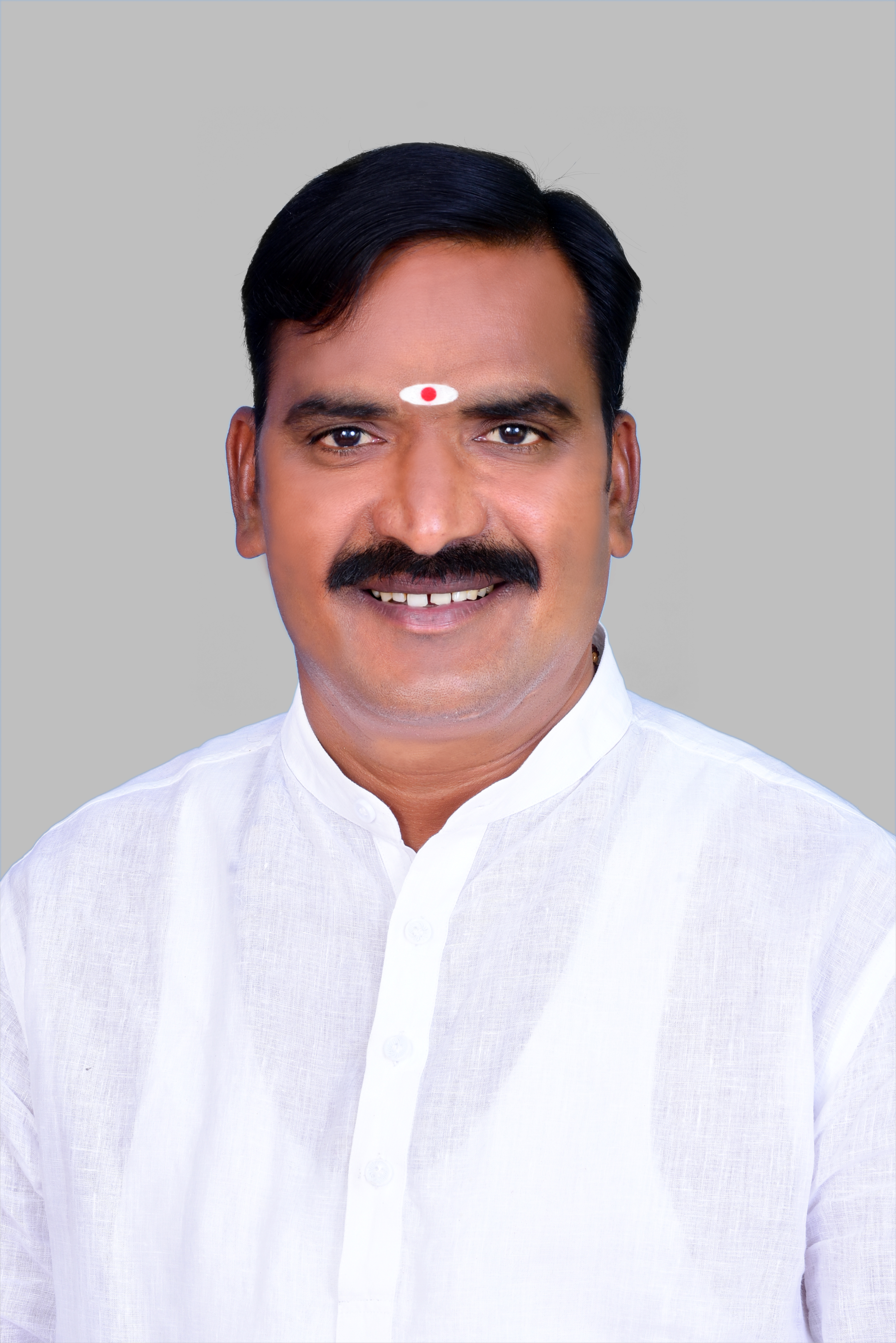
- Incumbent Beerla Ilaiah
- Party: Indian National Congress
- Elected year: 2023

Alair Assembly constituency is a constituency of the Telangana Legislative Assembly, India. It is one of 12 constituencies in Yadadri Bhuvanagiri district. It is part of Bhongir Lok Sabha constituency.

Beerla Ilaiah of Indian National Congress is currently representing the constituency.

== Mandals ==
The Assembly Constituency presently comprises the following Mandals:

Mandal
Alair
Rajapet
Yadagirigutta
Turkapally
Gundala
Atmakur (M)
Bommala Ramaram
Motakondur

== Members of the Legislative Assembly ==
Election	Member	Party
1952	Arutla Kamala Devi	People's Democratic Front
1957	Arutla Kamala Devi	People's Democratic Front
1962	Arutla Kamala Devi	Communist Party of India
1967	Anreddy Punna Reddy	Indian National Congress
1972	Anreddy Punna Reddy	Indian National Congress
1978	Salluri Pochaiah	Indian National Congress
1983	Motkupalli Narasimhulu	Telugu Desam Party
1985	Motkupalli Narasimhulu	Telugu Desam Party
1989	Motkupalli Narasimhulu	Independent politician
1994	Motkupalli Narasimhulu	Telugu Desam Party
1999	Motkupalli Narasimhulu	Indian National Congress
2004	Dr. Kududula Nagesh	Bharat Rashtra Samithi
2008 By-election	Dr. Kududula Nagesh	Bharat Rashtra Samithi
2009	Budida Bikshamaiah Goud	Indian National Congress
2014	Gongidi Suntiha	Bharat Rashtra Samithi
2018	Gongidi Suntiha	Bharat Rashtra Samithi
2023	Beerla Ilaiah	Indian National Congress

== Election results ==
=== Assembly Election 2023 ===
2023 Telangana Legislative Assembly election : Alair
Party	Candidate	Votes	%	±%
INC	Beerla Ilaiah	122,140	57.41%	▲24.89
BRS	Gongidi Suntiha	72,504	34.08%	New
BJP	Padala Srinivas	9,659	4.54%	▲1.93
Independent	Dheeravath Gopi Naik	1,591	0.75%	New
NOTA	None of the above	659	0.31%	▼0.46
Margin of victory		49,636	23.33%	▲5.92
Turnout		212,777	91.18%	▼0.31
Total valid votes		212,761		
Registered electors		233,366		▲11.47
INC gain from BRS		Swing	▲7.48	

=== Assembly Election 2018 ===
2018 Telangana Legislative Assembly election : Alair
Party	Candidate	Votes	%	±%
BRS	Gongidi Suntiha	94,870	49.93%	▼3.01
INC	Budida Bikshamaiah	61,784	32.52%	▼2.25
BSP	Kalluri Ramchandra Reddy	11,923	6.27%	▲5.33
Bahujana Left Party	Motkupalli Narasimhulu	10,473	5.51%	New
BJP	Donthiri Sridhar Reddy	4,967	2.61%	▼1.16
NOTA	None of the above	1,464	0.77%	▲0.32
Telugu Congress Party	Kandadi Manipal Reddy	1,230	0.65%	New
SP	Saritha Janne	1,200	0.63%	New
Margin of victory		33,086	17.41%	▼0.75
Turnout		191,534	91.49%	▲5.22
Total valid votes		190,016		
Registered electors		209,345		▲3.11
BRS hold		Swing	▼3.01	

=== Assembly Election 2014 ===
2014 Andhra Pradesh Legislative Assembly election : Alair
Party	Candidate	Votes	%	±%
BRS	Gongidi Suntiha	91,737	52.94%	▲20.96
INC	Budida Bikshamaiah	60,260	34.77%	▼4.85
ANC	Kotha Kishtaiah	7,086	4.09%	New
BJP	Dr. Kasam Venkateshwarlu	6,530	3.77%	▲0.42
BSP	Gopi Jonah	1,625	0.94%	▼2.54
CPI(M)	Gavala Rama Swamy	1,382	0.80%	New
NOTA	None of the above	778	0.45%	New
Margin of victory		31,477	18.16%	▲10.52
Turnout		175,160	86.27%	▲11.33
Total valid votes		173,293		
Registered electors		203,038		▼9.90
BRS gain from INC		Swing	▲13.32	

=== Assembly Election 2009 ===
2009 Andhra Pradesh Legislative Assembly election : Alair
Party	Candidate	Votes	%	±%
INC	Budida Bikshamaiah Goud	66,905	39.62%	▲20.48
BRS	Kallem Yadagiri Reddy	54,003	31.98%	▼7.29
PRP	Bandru Shobha Rani	16,659	9.86%	New
BSP	Dr. Kududula Nagesh	5,870	3.48%	New
BJP	Dr. Kasam Venkateshwarlu	5,664	3.35%	New
IJP	Chelmala Chandra Reddy	3,769	2.23%	New
Independent	Rachakonda Sitha	2,389	1.41%	New
LSP	Subburu Ramesh	2,099	1.24%	New
Independent	Ramchandra Reddy Gujjula	2,011	1.19%	New
Independent	T. Prathap Singh	1,956	1.16%	New
Margin of victory		12,902	7.64%	▲4.28
Turnout		168,882	74.94%	▲3.36
Total valid votes		168,882		
Registered electors		225,352		▲38.09
INC gain from BRS		Swing	▲0.35	

=== Assembly By-election 2008 ===
2008 Andhra Pradesh Legislative Assembly by-election : Alair
Party	Candidate	Votes	%	±%
BRS	Dr. Kududula Nagesh	45,867	39.27%	▼16.56
TDP	Motkupalli Narasimhulu	41,943	35.91%	▲1.08
INC	Shaga Lazarus	22,357	19.14%	New
Independent	Yonte Paka Swaroopa Rani	1,991	1.70%	New
Independent	Paladugu Gouramma Alias Mary Kumari	1,562	1.34%	New
Independent	Kotha Kishtaiah	971	0.83%	New
Independent	Potta Venkataiah	809	0.69%	New
Margin of victory		3,924	3.36%	▼17.64
Turnout		116,810	71.58%	▼3.14
Total valid votes		116,797		
Registered electors		163,195		▲3.11
BRS hold		Swing	▼16.56	

=== Assembly Election 2004 ===
2004 Andhra Pradesh Legislative Assembly election : Alair
Party	Candidate	Votes	%	±%
BRS	Dr. Kududula Nagesh	66,010	55.83%	New
TDP	Motkupalli Narasimhulu	41,185	34.83%	▼7.84
JP	Dr. Etikala Purushotham	2,719	2.30%	New
Independent	Thuti Sanjeeva	2,026	1.71%	New
Independent	Kashapaka Chandraiah	2,014	1.70%	New
Independent	Golluri Anjaiah	1,602	1.35%	New
BSP	Battu Ramchandraiah	1,523	1.29%	▲0.87
Independent	Sunchu Jannaiah	1,316	1.11%	New
Margin of victory		24,825	21.00%	▲14.20
Turnout		118,266	74.72%	▼1.71
Total valid votes		118,241		
Rejected ballots		25	0.02%	▼2.61
Registered electors		158,280		▲5.21
BRS gain from INC		Swing	▲6.36	

=== Assembly Election 1999 ===
1999 Andhra Pradesh Legislative Assembly election : Alair
Party	Candidate	Votes	%	±%
INC	Motkupalli Narasimhulu	55,384	49.47%	▲20.80
TDP	Dr. Kududula Nagesh	47,767	42.67%	▼23.01
CPI	Challoori Poshaiah	7,012	6.26%	New
Margin of victory		7,617	6.80%	▼30.20
Turnout		114,983	76.43%	▲4.11
Total valid votes		111,958		
Rejected ballots		3,025	2.63%	▲0.86
Registered electors		150,435		▲1.48
INC gain from TDP		Swing	▼16.21	

=== Assembly Election 1994 ===
1994 Andhra Pradesh Legislative Assembly election : Alair
Party	Candidate	Votes	%	±%
TDP	Motkupalli Narasimhulu	69,172	65.68%	▲31.01
INC	Dr. Kududula Nagesh	30,197	28.67%	New
BJP	Gurram Janardhan	3,072	2.92%	New
Independent	Kalepu Adivaiah	1,750	1.66%	New
Margin of victory		38,975	37.00%	▲23.67
Turnout		107,218	72.32%	▲1.22
Total valid votes		105,324		
Rejected ballots		1,894	1.77%	▼4.57
Registered electors		148,245		▲5.42
TDP gain from Independent		Swing	▲17.68	

=== Assembly Election 1989 ===
1989 Andhra Pradesh Legislative Assembly election : Alair
Party	Candidate	Votes	%	±%
Independent	Motkupalli Narasimhulu	44,953	48.00%	New
TDP	Yadagi Basani Sunnam	32,472	34.67%	▼33.86
Independent	Yata Vemkata Swamy	12,769	13.63%	New
BSP	Mukka Narahari	1,387	1.48%	New
Independent	Budidi Mallaiah	1,380	1.47%	New
Margin of victory		12,481	13.33%	▼37.15
Turnout		99,990	71.10%	▲7.25
Total valid votes		93,649		
Rejected ballots		6,341	6.34%	▲4.28
Registered electors		140,629		▲22.81
Independent gain from TDP		Swing	▼20.53	

=== Assembly Election 1985 ===
1985 Andhra Pradesh Legislative Assembly election : Alair
Party	Candidate	Votes	%	±%
TDP	Motkupalli Narasimhulu	49,068	68.53%	New
INC	Chettupalli Kennedy	12,922	18.05%	▼9.88
Independent	Salluri Pochaiah	6,788	9.48%	New
Independent	Neredu Swamy	1,293	1.81%	New
Independent	Bhuwanagiri Bichapathi	583	0.81%	New
Independent	Konapuram Chandraiah	539	0.75%	New
Margin of victory		36,146	50.48%	▲39.15
Turnout		73,109	63.85%	▼3.82
Total valid votes		71,604		
Rejected ballots		1,505	2.06%	▼0.08
Registered electors		114,507		▲11.98
TDP gain from Independent		Swing	▲29.26	

=== Assembly Election 1983 ===
1983 Andhra Pradesh Legislative Assembly election : Alair
Party	Candidate	Votes	%	±%
Independent	Motkupalli Narasimhulu	26,589	39.27%	New
INC	Sallooru Poshiah	18,914	27.93%	▲8.95
CPI	Ramchander. B	15,951	23.56%	New
BJP	Kandula Buchaiah	2,868	4.24%	New
Independent	Tatikayala Mallaiah	1,426	2.11%	New
INC(J)	Krishna Dhakoori	791	1.17%	New
Independent	Mailarapu Yadagiri	561	0.83%	New
Margin of victory		7,675	11.33%	▼15.81
Turnout		69,193	67.67%	▼6.41
Total valid votes		67,713		
Rejected ballots		1,480	2.14%	▼0.83
Registered electors		102,256		▲4.26
Independent gain from INC(I)		Swing	▼13.20	

=== Assembly Election 1978 ===
1978 Andhra Pradesh Legislative Assembly election : Alair
Party	Candidate	Votes	%	±%
INC(I)	Salluri Pochaiah	36,989	52.47%	New
JP	Patti Venkatramulu	17,852	25.32%	New
INC	Mukka Rajamallaiah	13,381	18.98%	▼22.02
Independent	Yata Vemkata Swamy	2,279	3.23%	New
Margin of victory		19,137	27.14%	▲14.55
Turnout		72,657	74.08%	▲4.75
Total valid votes		70,501		
Rejected ballots		2,156	2.97%	▲2.97
Registered electors		98,077		▲12.62
INC(I) gain from INC		Swing	▲11.47	

=== Assembly Election 1972 ===
1972 Andhra Pradesh Legislative Assembly election : Alair
Party	Candidate	Votes	%	±%
INC	Anreddy Punna Reddy	24,028	41.00%	▼1.18
Independent	K. Yakubu Reddy	16,653	28.42%	New
CPI	Pareddy Chenna Reddy	15,100	25.77%	▲3.55
Independent	Deeravathu Namayya	2,819	4.81%	New
Margin of victory		7,375	12.59%	▼7.37
Turnout		60,377	69.33%	▼2.49
Total valid votes		58,600		
Registered electors		87,085		▲12.28
INC hold		Swing	▼1.18	

=== Assembly Election 1967 ===
1967 Andhra Pradesh Legislative Assembly election : Alair
Party	Candidate	Votes	%	±%
INC	Anreddy Punna Reddy	22,404	42.18%	▼5.49
CPI	P. C. Reddy	11,801	22.22%	▼30.11
Independent	Y. N. Reddy	10,770	20.27%	New
CPI(M)	B. Narsimha	7,255	13.66%	New
ABJS	R. Venkataiah	890	1.68%	New
Margin of victory		10,603	19.96%	▲15.31
Turnout		55,702	71.82%	▲6.18
Total valid votes		53,120		
Registered electors		77,558		▲36.33
INC gain from CPI		Swing	▼10.15	

=== Assembly Election 1962 ===
1962 Andhra Pradesh Legislative Assembly election : Alair
Party	Candidate	Votes	%	±%
CPI	Arutla Kamala Devi	18,763	52.33%	New
INC	Anreddy Punna Reddy	17,094	47.67%	▲8.72
Margin of victory		1,669	4.65%	▼8.26
Turnout		37,346	65.64%	▲3.44
Total valid votes		35,857		
Registered electors		56,891		▲10.66
CPI gain from PDF		Swing	▲0.48	

=== Assembly Election 1957 ===
1957 Andhra Pradesh Legislative Assembly election : Alair
Party	Candidate	Votes	%	±%
PDF	Arutla Kamala Devi	16,581	51.85%	▼14.38
INC	Anreddy Punna Reddy	12,454	38.95%	▲5.18
ABJS	K. Yadgiri	2,943	9.20%	New
Margin of victory		4,127	12.91%	▼19.56
Turnout		31,978	62.20%	▲5.75
Total valid votes		31,978		
Registered electors		51,411		▲2.06
PDF hold		Swing	▼14.38	

=== Assembly Election 1952 ===
1952 Hyderabad State Legislative Assembly election : Aler
Party	Candidate	Votes	%	±%
PDF	Arutla Kamala Devi	18,834	66.23%	New
INC	Kancherla Rama Krishna Reddy	9,602	33.77%	New
Margin of victory		9,232	32.47%	
Turnout		28,436	56.45%	
Total valid votes		28,436		
Registered electors		50,372		
PDF win (new seat)				

== See also ==
- Alair
- List of constituencies of Telangana Legislative Assembly
