= Bhongir revenue division =

Coordinates: 17.1415°N 79.6236°E

Bhongir revenue division, Bhuvanagiri revenue division, భువనగిరి రెవిన్యూ విభాగం
- Country: India
- State: Telangana
- District: Yadadri Bhuvanagiri district

Bhongir revenue division (or Bhuvanagiri revenue division) is an administrative division in the Yadadri Bhuvanagiri district of the Indian state of Telangana. It is one of the 2 revenue divisions in the district which consists of 11 mandals under its administration. Bhongir is the divisional headquarters of the division. The revenue division got modified on 11 October 2011, based on the re-organisation of the districts in the state.

== Administration ==
The mandals in the Bhongir revenue division are:

S.No.	Bhongir revenue division
1	Bhongir
2	Alair
3	Atmakur (M)
4	Addaguduru
5	Bibinagar
6	Bommalaramaram
7	Gundala
8	Motakondur
9	Mothkur
10	Rajapet
11	Turkapally
12	Yadagirigutta

== See also ==
- List of revenue divisions in Telangana
- List of mandals in Telangana
