= Arutla (surname) =

Arutla (Telugu: ఆరుట్ల) is a Telugu surname. Notable people with the surname include:

- Arutla Kamala Devi (1920–2001), Indian politician and activist
- Arutla Ramchandra Reddy (born 1909), Indian politician and activist
