= Dharmojigudem =

- Village
- Country: India
- State: Telangana

Languages
  - Official: Telugu
- Time zone: UTC+5:30 (IST)
- Postal code: 508252

Dharmojigudem is a village in Yadadri district in Telangana, India. It falls under Choutuppal mandal. Its part of Hyderabad Metropolitan Development Authority.

== Schools ==
There is a Zilla Parishad High School in the village.
