= Pranay =

- Gender: male
- Language: Sanskrit

Origin
- Meaning: "affection/love", "regard"
- Region of origin: India

Pranay is a Hindu Indian masculine given name, which means "affection/love" or "regard".

Notable people with the name include:

- Pranay Chulet, Indian entrepreneur, founder of Quikr
- Pranay Gupte, Indian-American journalist, author and newspaper founder
- Pranaya SJB Rana, Nepali journalist, author and newspaper editor
- Pranay Sahay, Indian police officer
- Pranay Sharma, Indian cricketer
- Dasyam Pranay Bhasker, Indian politician
- Pranayraj Vangari, Telugu theatre research scholar and Telugu Wikipedia Administrator
