= Allapur, Yadadri Bhuvanagiri district =

Allapur Allapuram Allapuram
- Village
- Nickname: Allapuram
- Location in Telangana, India Allapur (India)
- Coordinates: 17.2410851°N 78.84746569999°E
- Country: India
- State: Telangana
- Founder: Tekula Prashanth Reddy
- Named for: Sri Sri Sri Sarala Maisamma Thalli Temple Allapuram

Languages
  - Official: Telugu
- Time zone: UTC+5:30 (IST)
- PIN: 508252
- Vehicle registration: TS
- Website: telangana.gov.in

Allapur is a village in Choutuppal mandal, Yadadri Bhuvanagiri in Telangana, India.
