= Prayanam =

Prayanam (lit. 'jouney' in Indian languages) may refer to:

- Prayanam (1975 film), an Indian Malayalam-language film directed by Bharathan
- Prayanam (2009 film), an Indian Telugu-language film directed by Chandra Sekhar Yeleti

== See also ==
- Payanam (disambiguation)
- Pranayam (disambiguation)
- Pranayama, a yogic practice
