= C. Gerald Fraser =

American journalist (1925–2015)

- Born: Charles Gerald Fraser; July 30, 1925; Boston, Massachusetts, U.S.
- Died: December 9, 2015 (aged 90); The Bronx, New York, U.S.
- Education: University of Wisconsin-Madison; New School for Social Research
- Occupation: Journalist
- Spouse: Geraldine McCarthy (d. 1981)
- Partner: M. Phyllis Cunningham
- Children: 2

Charles Gerald Fraser (July 30, 1925 – December 9, 2015) was an American journalist, best known for his long service (1967–1991) at The New York Times, having begun his journalistic career at the New York Amsterdam News in 1952. He was described by journalist and sociologist Thom Blair as "a citizen journalist inside the mainstream press".

== Early life and education ==
He was born as Charles Gerald Fraser Jr. in Boston, Massachusetts, on July 30, 1925, to parents who had migrated to the United States from the Caribbean. His father, who was a cook, came from Guyana, and his mother, a seamstress, from Jamaica.

Fraser earned a bachelor's degree in economics in 1949 from the University of Wisconsin–Madison, where he worked on the student newspaper. He then obtained a master's degree at The New School for Social Research, in New York.

== Career ==
From 1952 to 1956, Fraser worked as a reporter with the New York Amsterdam News. There, as Herb Boyd notes, "he covered everything from crime, housing integration, social affairs, economic issues, civil rights, education and labor." Fraser subsequently worked at the United Nations for several West Indian publications, prior to being hired by the New York Daily News.

In 1967, Fraser was employed by The New York Times, becoming the paper's second Black reporter. Later colleague Pranay Gupte, commenting in the Huffington Post on those "tough years in the journalism of an era where blacks weren't necessarily welcomed and their acuity questioned", recalled: "He would come up with his own assignments – not only about the burgeoning black communities in New York state, but also about a wide range of issues".

Leaving The New York Times in 1991, Fraser joined Earth Times, a monthly publication campaigning on environmental affairs, where he became a senior editor.

Fraser also taught at the Columbia University Graduate School of Journalism and at John Jay College of Criminal Justice of the City University of New York.

== Death ==
Fraser died at Calvary Hospital in the Bronx on December 9, 2015, having been diagnosed with cancer.

He was honored in the 2016 National Association of Black Journalists Hall of Fame as a pioneer and "inspirational mentor for generations of reporters".

== Selected articles ==
- "SNCC Has Lost Much of Its Power to Black Panthers", Eugene Register-Guard, October 9, 1968
- "Amilcar Cabral Death for A Symbol Of Hope", The New York Times, January 26, 1973
- "Defiant Judge Again Backs Right to Abortion Privacy", The New York Times, June 21, 1973
- "Art Farmer Finds Jazz In Europe Challenging", The New York Times, August 26, 1976
- "THEATER: 'Show Cause'", The New York Times, December 19, 1985
- "C. L. R. James, Historian, Critic And Pan-Africanist, Is Dead at 88", The New York Times, June 2, 1989
- "Me, my children, Chicago and Obama", Chronicle World, November 17, 2008
