= Lakkaram =

- Village
- Location in Telangana, India Lakkaram (India)
- Coordinates: 17°16′N 78°53′E
- Country: India
- State: Telangana
- District: Yadadri Bhuvanagiri
- Mandal: Choutuppal

Languages
  - Official: Telugu
- Time zone: UTC+5:30 (IST)
- PIN: 508252

Lakkaram is a village in Yadadri Bhuvanagiri in Telangana, India. It falls under Choutuppal mandal& choutuppal municipality. It has 2 wards. It is added advantage for this village to be near by Choutuppal. As it falls beside NH 65(NH 9), real estate boom present here. There are several famous schools for example Model High School, San Juan, SKDVM. It attracts people from other places for doing business.
