= Laxma Puram =

Lakshmapuram is a village located in Ramannapeta Mandal, Yadadri Bhuvanagiri (earlier Nalgonda district), Telangana. It had a population of 1,872 across 442 households in the 2011 Census of India.
