= Chinna Kondur =

- Village
- Location in Telangana, India Chinna Kondur (India)
- Coordinates: 17°18′N 78°54′E
- Country: India
- State: Telangana

Government
  - Type: s

Languages
  - Official: Telugu
- Time zone: UTC+5:30 (IST)

Chinna Kondur is a village in Yadadri Bhuvanagiri in Telangana, India. It falls under Choutuppal mandal.
