= Choutuppal =

- Census town
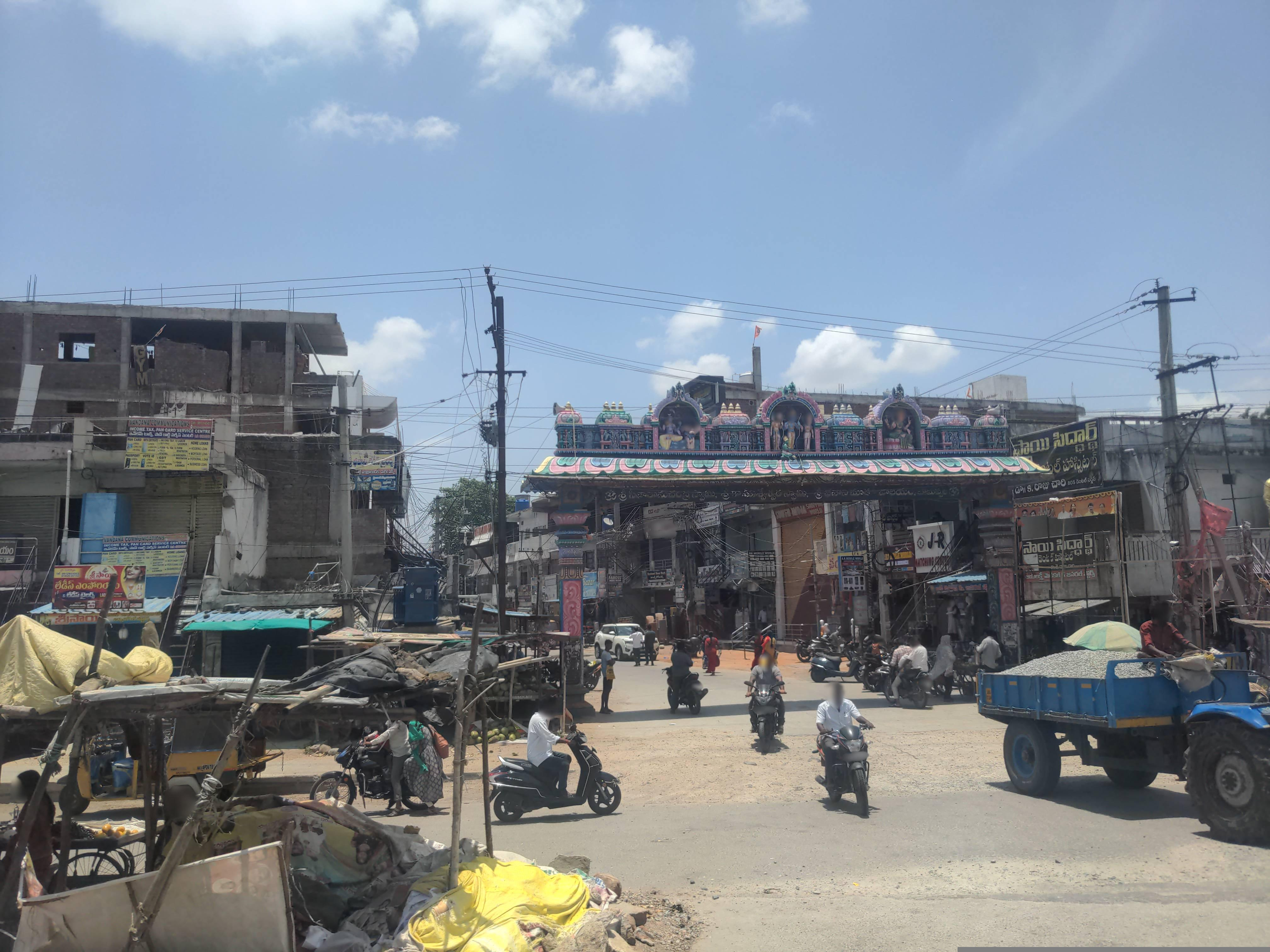
- A junction on Choutuppal main road

- Location in Telangana, India Choutuppal (India)
- Coordinates: 17°15′03″N 78°53′50″E
- Country: India
- State: Telangana
- District: Yadadri Bhuvanagiri
- Metropolitan area: Hyderabad Metropolitan Region

Government
  - Type: Municipal Council
  - Body: Municipality

Area
  - Total: 12.79 km^{2} (4.94 sq mi)

Population (2011)
  - Total: 19,092
  - Density: 1,493/km^{2} (3,866/sq mi)

Languages
  - Official: Telugu
- Time zone: UTC+5:30 (IST)
- PIN: 508252
- Vehicle registration: TG 30
- Nearest city: Hyderabad
- Lok Sabha constituency: Bhongir (Lok Sabha constituency)
- Vidhan Sabha constituency: Munugode Assembly constituency
- Website: telangana.gov.in

Choutuppal is a census town in Yadadri Bhuvanagiri district of the Indian state of Telangana. It is located in Choutuppal mandal of Choutuppal division. Its part of Hyderabad Metropolitan Development Authority. 49 km from Hyderabad.

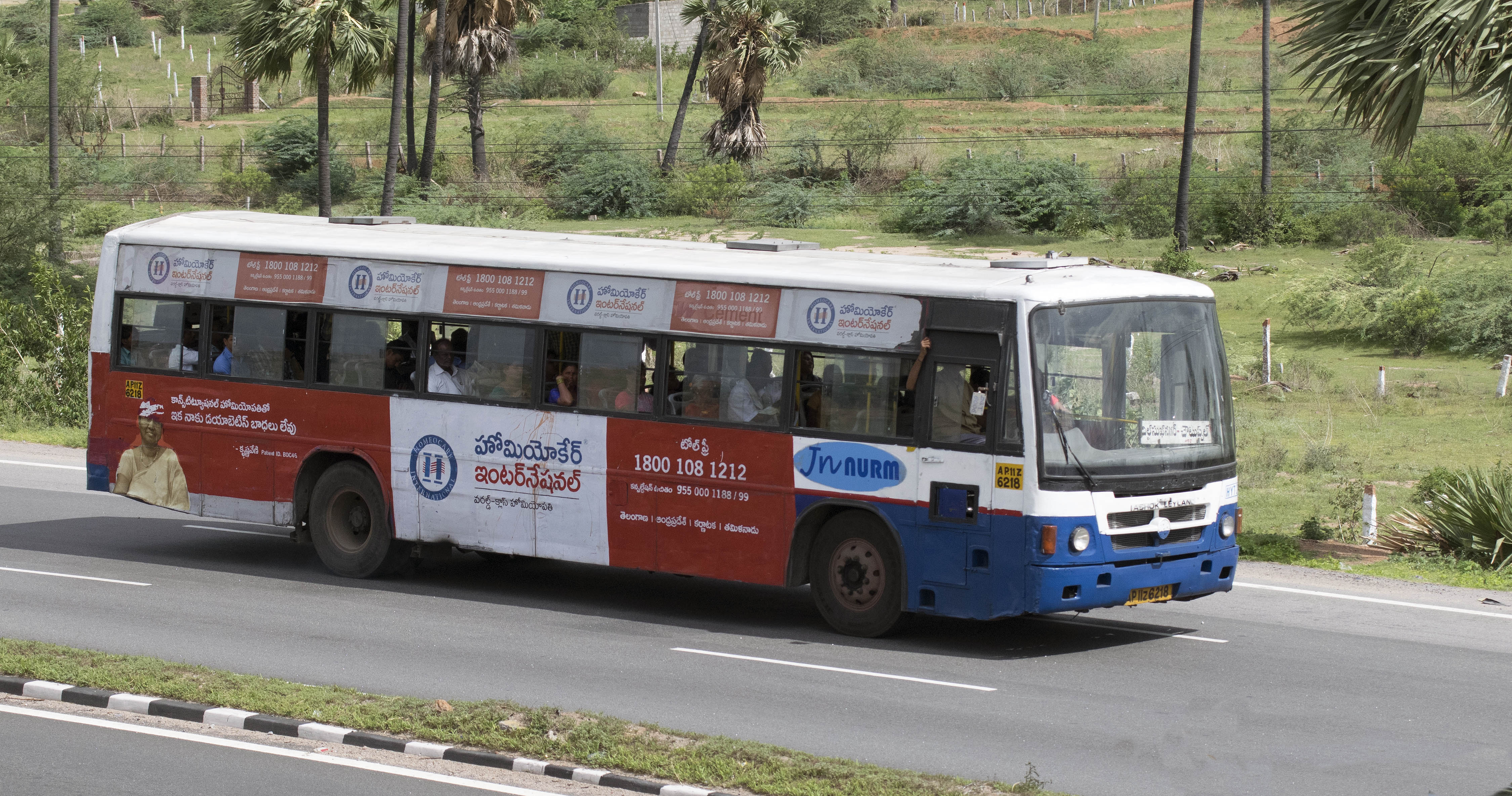
A local bus that commutes between Dilsukhnagar and Choutuppal

== Demographics ==
As of 2011 India census, Choutuppal is a Census Town city in district of Yadadri-Bhuvanagiri, Telangana. The Choutuppal Census Town has population of 19,092 of which 9,588 are males while 9,504 are females as per report released by Census India 2011.

The population of children aged 0-6 is 2410 which is 12.62% of total population of Choutuppal (CT). In Choutuppal Census Town, the female sex ratio is 991 against state average of 993. Moreover, the child sex ratio in Choutuppal is around 942 compared to Telangana state average of 939. The literacy rate of Choutuppal city is 82.41% higher than the state average of 67.02%. In Choutuppal, male literacy is around 88.85% while the female literacy rate is 75.97%.

Choutuppal Census Town has total administration over 4,565 houses to which it supplies basic amenities like water and sewerage. It is also authorized to build roads within Census Town limits and impose taxes on properties coming under its jurisdiction.

Nearby mandals of Choutuppal are Samsthan Narayanapur, Bhoodan Pochampally, Valigonda, Chityala, Munugode.

== Villages ==
Villages	Population
Allapur	687
Chinna Kondur	6,062
Devalamma Nagaram	6,321
Jai Kesaram	3,065
Khairathpur	832
Koyalagudem, Yadadri Bhuvanagiri district	
Lakkaram	3,945
Lingoji Guda	3,888
Malkapur	3,665
Nelapatla	3,052
Panthangi	6,307
Peddakondur	
Peepal Pahad	2,789
Swamulavari Lingotam	2,629
Tallasingaram	1,597
Tangad Palle	6,940
Tupranpet	1,501
Yellagiri	964

== Politics ==
Bhuvanagiri as a Lok Sabha constituency came into existence in 2008 as per Delimitation Act of 2002.

- Komatireddy Venkat Reddy is the present MP
- Komatireddy Rajagopal Reddy is the present MLA(2024 ELECTIONS)

Venreddy Raju is the present choutuppal municipal chairman chairman of choutuppal municipality

== Nearest cities ==
- Hyderabad – 50 km
- Pedda Amberpet ORR – 30 km
- Bhongir – 34 km
- Nalgonda – 52 km
- Suryapet – 88 km

== Transport ==
- Nearest Bus station: Choutuppal – 5 km
- Nearest Railway Division(All Trains): Secunderabad Code:SC – 56 km
- Nearest Airport: RGIA Hyderabad(Shamshabad) – 65 km
