= Mothkur =

Mothkur Mothkur
- Village
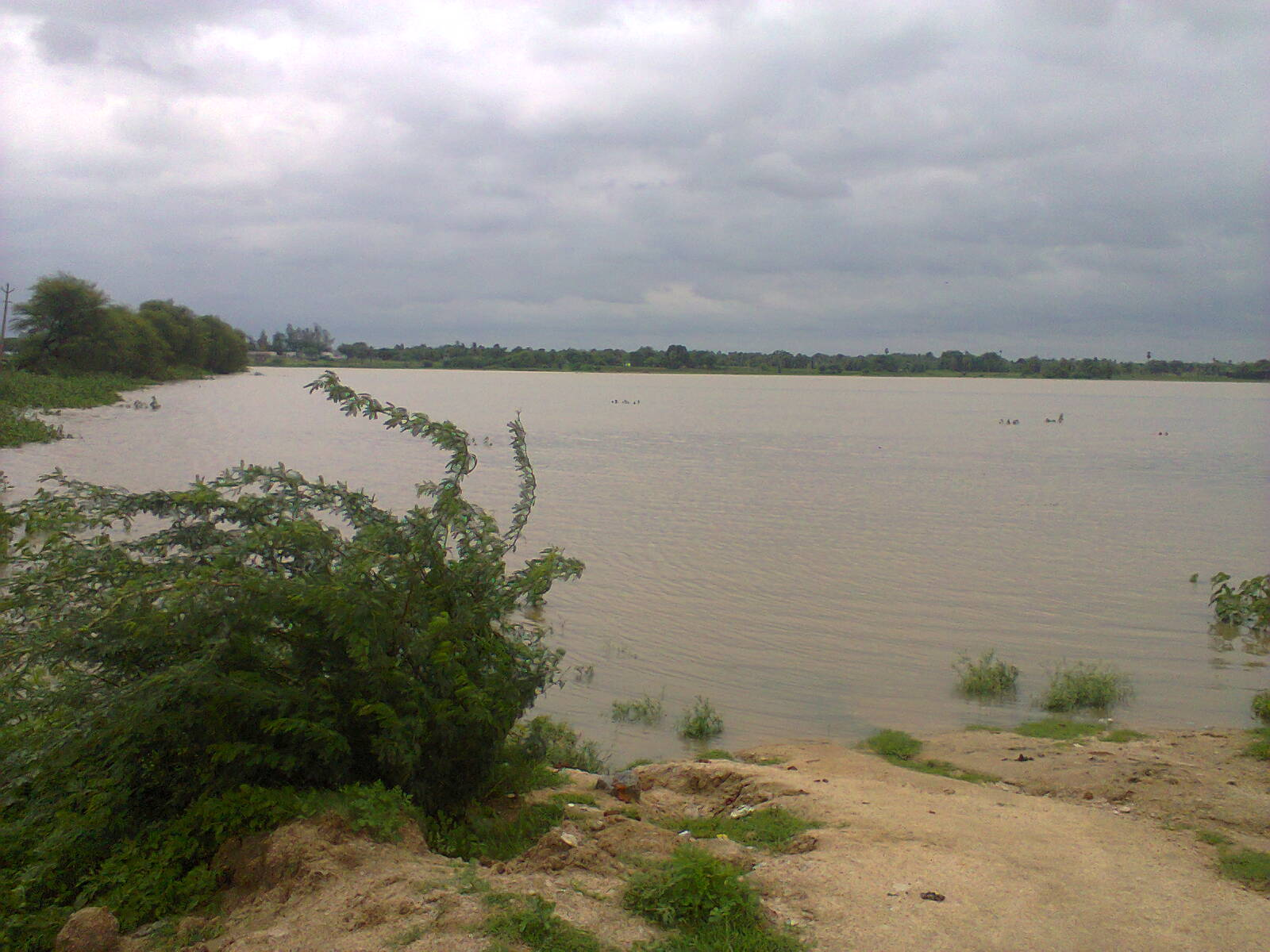
- Mothkur Mini Tank band

- Mothkur (Telangana) Mothkur (India)
- Coordinates: 17.456900°N 79.259200°E
- Country: India
- State: Telangana
- District: Yadadri Bhuvanagiri

Area
  - Total: 34.18 km^{2} (13.20 sq mi)
- Elevation: 309 m (1,014 ft)

Population (2011)
  - Total: 12,616
  - Density: 369.1/km^{2} (956.0/sq mi)

Languages
  - Official: Telugu
- Time zone: UTC+5:30 (IST)
- PIN: 508277
- Telephone code: 91 8694
- Vehicle registration: TS 05
- Lok Sabha constituency: Bhuvanagiri
- Vidhan Sabha constituency: Tungathurthy
- Website: telangana.gov.in

Mothkur is a municipality and also a mandal headquarters in Yadadri Bhuvanagiri district in the Indian state of Telangana. It was formerly a taluka. Mothkur is located 90 kilometers away from Telangana's capital city, Hyderabad.

== Geography ==
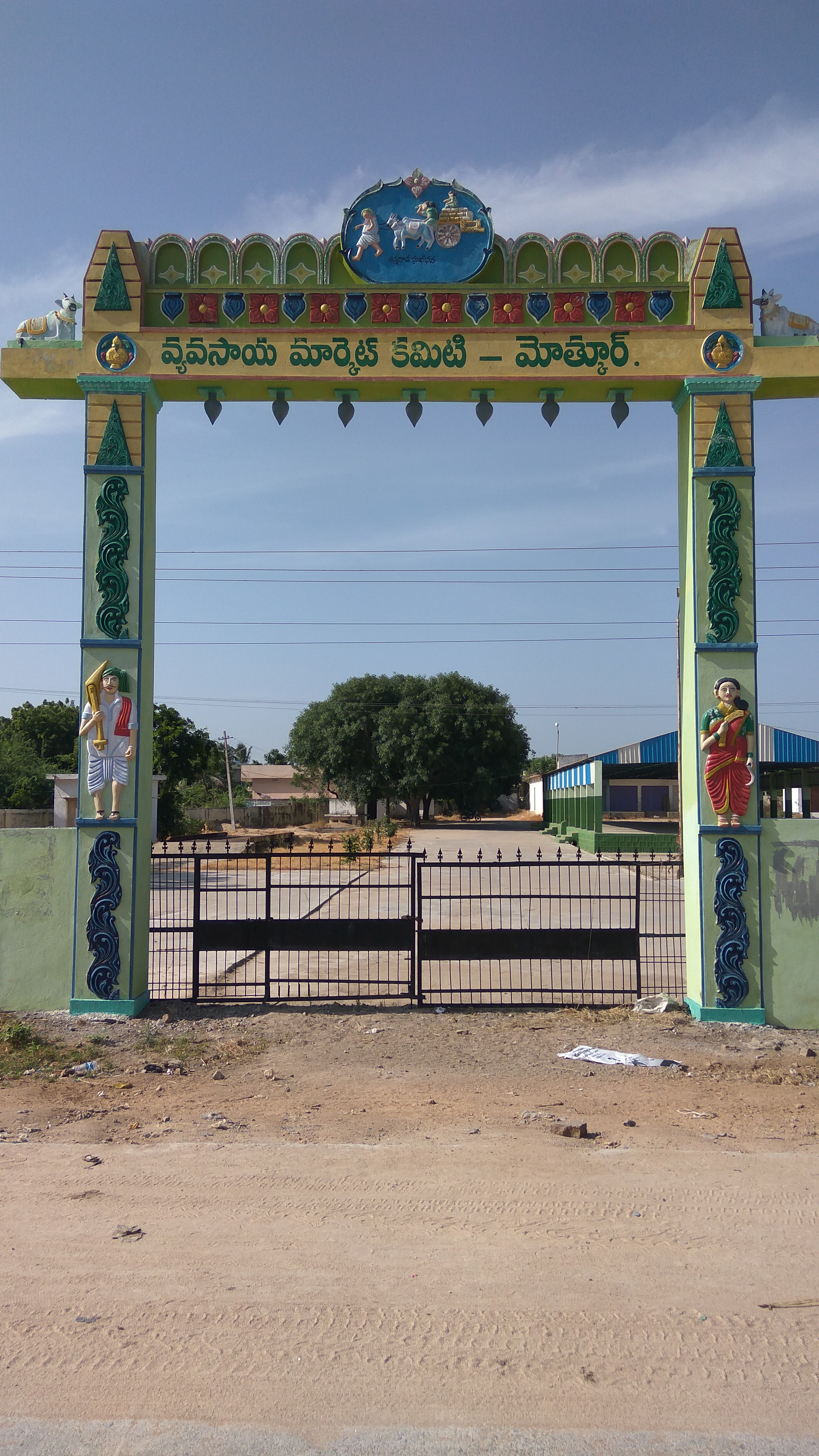
Agricultural Market, mothkur

Mothkur is located at 17.4500°N 79.2667°E. It has an average elevation of 292 metres (961 ft).

== Etymology ==
The name Mothkur evolved from Modhuga-luru, which refers to the modhuga plant..

== History ==
Historically part of the Telangana region, the area was under the administration of the Hyderabad State during the rule of the Nizam of Hyderabad. Following the reorganization of states, it remained part of the Nalgonda district until the formation of the new Yadadri Bhuvanagiri district in 2016. Having met the statutory demographic and revenue thresholds, Mothkur was officially upgraded from a gram panchayat to a Grade-III municipality in 2019.

== Demographics ==
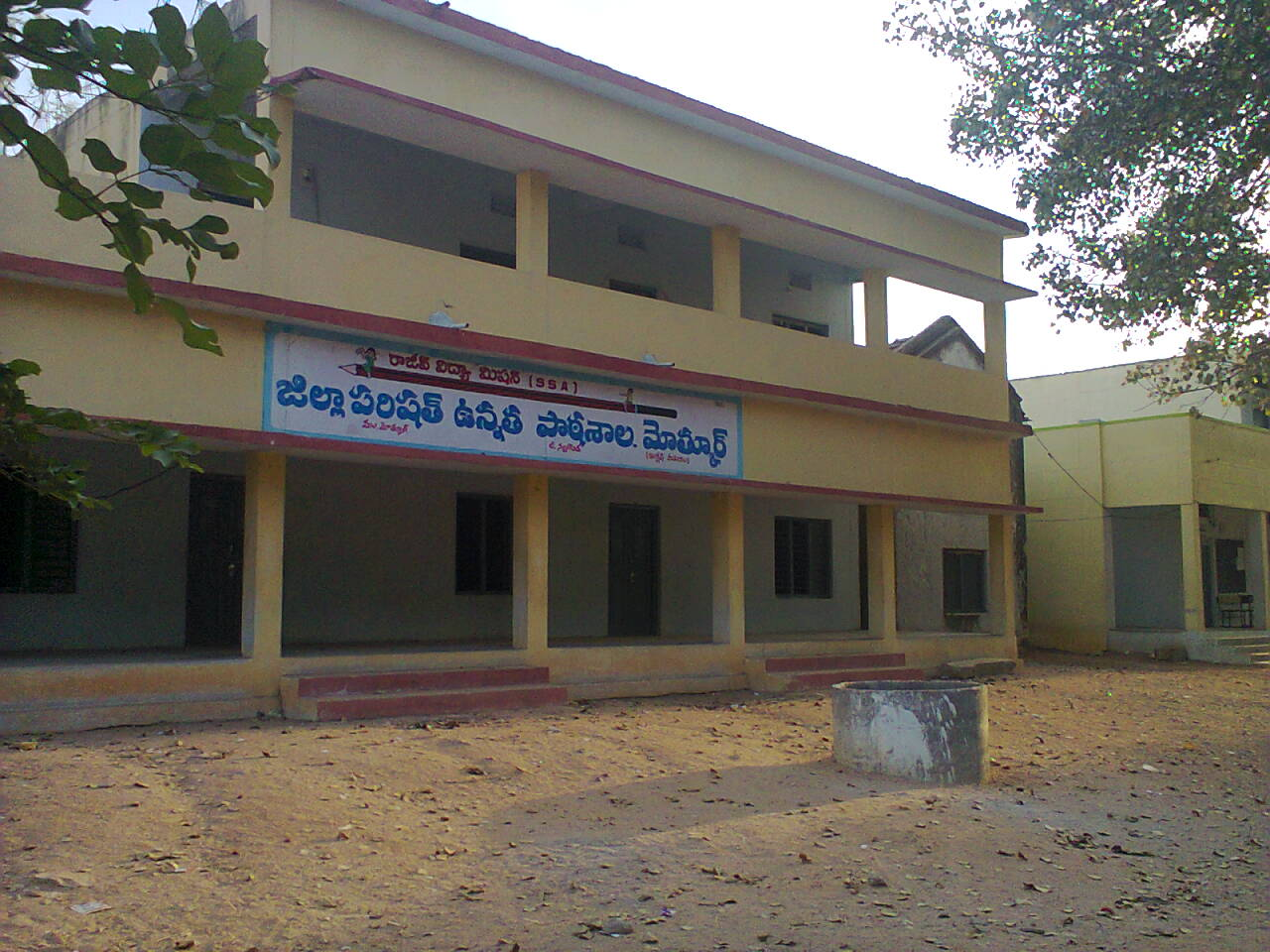
Zilla Parishad High School, mothkur

Mothkur town total population is 12616 and number of houses are 3202. The female population is 49.3%. The town literacy rate is 64.2% and the female Literacy rate is 27.5%.

The population of Mothkur Mandal as per 2001 census is 55638 and 2011 census is 55699 with a very low growth of 0.11%. The nearby mandals are Addagudur, which was excerpted from Mothkur as a new mandal.

== Economy ==
The local economy is predominantly agrarian. According to census data, the primary agricultural activities in the region include the cultivation of paddy and cotton. The town also contains basic food processing units, such as rice mills, and serves as a local market center for surrounding rural areas.

== Politics ==
Mothkur is situated in the assembly constituency of Tungathurty, and Parliamentary constituency of Bhuvanagiri.

It is a former Taluka. and this was under Ramannapet constituency earlier. Political Stalwarts like Gurram Yadagiri Reddy Uppunuthala Purushottam Reddy, Kalvala Prabhakar Rao, N.Preetham K.RamakrishnaReddy belongs to this region.

Mothkur is Epicentre during CPI led Telangana SayudhaPoratam and also in later period.

There are huge demands for a Government Degree college and TSRTC Bus Depot, Revenue Division

30 bedded Government Hospital

There is Widespread demand among people to Declare Mothkur as Assembly constituency with Mothkur, Atmakur, Gundala, Addagudur mandals.

== About Town ==
Gundala, Mothkur and Atmakur were popularly known as TriSisters (three sisters). It is a regional trade centre for the four mandals.They are Mothkur, Atmakur and Gundala and Addagudur. It is located on the banks of Bikkeru a tributary of Musi River which itself is a tributary of river Krishna. Roadways are the only mode of transport to this town. There are variety of shops and Markets that cater the needs of the people who live in villages surrounding Mothkur.

Though the majority of the people are Hindus, the town has substantial presence of Muslims, and a little Christian community. The town has the Ramalingeshwara temple belonging to medieval India (probably Kakatiyas), Peddamma temple and SaiBaba temple pothaigadda. Sri venkateswara swamy temple in Venkateswara colony. Some mosques and a missionary run chapel. Every year at Ramalingeshwara swamy temple a local festival called "Agni Gundalu (అగ్ని గుండాలు )" is conducted after the famous Hindu festival Holi. Many people attend for this local festival from nearby villages.

It is an agricultural town with a small sized food processing industry, mainly rice mills, and vegetable oil mills. Wet paddy is the major crop, other crops include cotton, fruits, and other vegetables and pulses. It is a developing town. Marketing of natural goods is the major source.Paddy marketing is the major resource.Also now mothkur is now hub for regional textile industry with handloom Cooperatives.

This town has one cinema theatre – Tara Theatre.

The town consists of Old Busstand, New Busstand and Pothaigadda. Old Mothkur is also called as the Old bus stand area. New Mothkur is well planned and has many residential colonies like the Drivers Colony, Padmashaali Colony, Teachers Colony, Lourdu Nagar, Venkateswara Colony and Sundarayya Colony, Gandhinagar. New busstand consists of RTC Busstand, police station and Zilla Parishad High School. The town has a big tank named Pedda Cheruvu and that area called as Cheruvu katta on which there is a road towards Tirumalagiri and Thorrur. Mothkur Cheruvu was developed as Mini Tankbund by Govt of telangana. Most of the government offices i.e, Municipal office, MPDO OFFICE, MRO OFFICE, PHC, FIRE STATION are situated after the crossing with the Cheruvu. That area was known as DaBunglow Area. Mothkur now became municipality under new municipal Act 2019 by Merging some villages to Mothkur. They are Rajanna gudem, Dharmapuram, Bujilapuram, Jamachetlabavi, Kondapuram. It now emerged as big town with population over twenty thousand.

== Education ==
Sacred Heart High School, a christian missionary school, reputed all over the state for producing talented students every year who were at high positions in various Government and private sectors. There are many other Private and public schools in mothkur, including Zillaparishad High School, Govt.primary school. Private Schools like Akshara, Sai chaithanya, Shivashivani, LittleFlower etc.

Government junior college was present at aregudem road of mothkur.

there are some private junior and degree colleges like Santhosh SaiRam Akshara etc in mothkur.

== LifeStyle and Culture ==
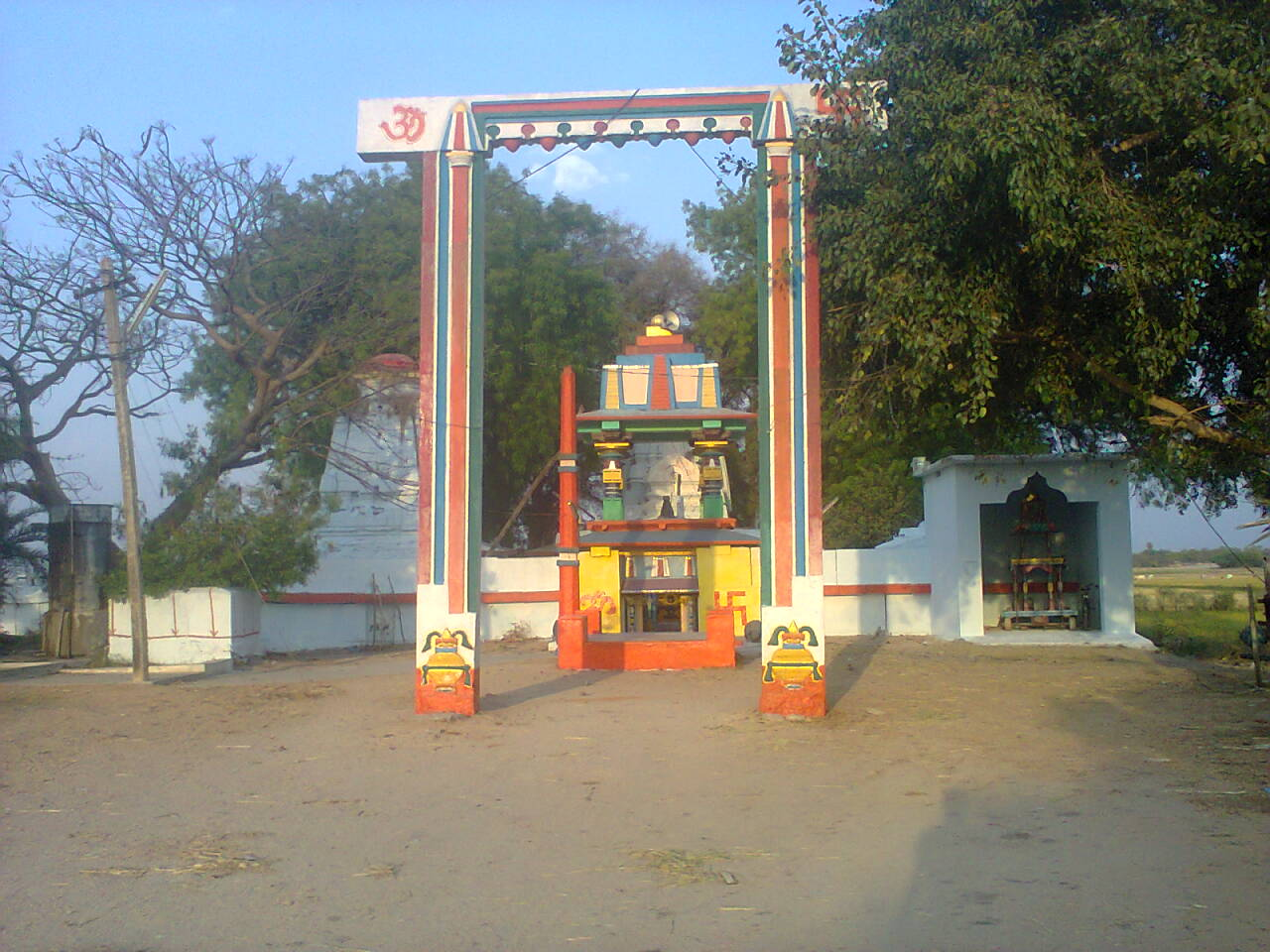
Shri RamaLingeshwara Temple, mothkur

The town has the Ramalingeshwara temple belonging to medieval India (probably Kakatiyas) Every year at Ramalingeshwara swamy temple a local Antara helds it is called "Agni Gundalu (అగ్ని గుండాలు )" is conducted after the famous Hindu festival Holi. Peddamma Temple at new busstand. Muthyalamma Gudi at Cheruvukatta, famous for Bonalu.

Ugadhi was uniquely celebrated and special in whole Telangana.famously known as "Non veg Ugadhi".Bullock cart exhibition was one more special attraction. Many people attend for this event from nearby villages.

It is an agricultural town with a small sized food processing industry, mainly rice mills, and vegetable oil mills. Wet paddy is the major crop, other crops include red chili peppers, cotton, green gram, castor and other vegetables and pulses. It is a developing town. Marketing of natural goods is the major source. There are many Banks, petrol pumps, Function halls and schools.

Paddy and cotton marketing is the major resource.

Weekend Market (అంగడి ): Every Sunday there will be a local weekend Market (called "అంగడి" in Local Language Telugu) is conducted. This market is famous for sale of Animals used for agriculture, vegetables, clothes and common groceries.

== Mandal Details ==
The Mothkur mandal consists of 10 villages:

- Anajipuram
- Musipatla
- Panakabanda
- Ragibavi
- Dathapagudam
- Paladugu
- Podichedu
- Dacharam
- Patimatla
- Sadarshapur

== Notable Persons ==
The region has produced several individuals who have contributed to the socio-political, agricultural, and cultural development of Telangana.

1. KASOJU SRIKANTH CHARY the first Martyr in Telangana Statehood movement was proud son of Poduchedu in mothkur mandal.
2. Late Shri Kalvala Narahari Rao (1891–1942) was Vathandar (Mali Patel) in Nizam government, great Philanthropist, and a landed gentry. Developed community common water wells, community marriage system, temples, various charities. At times risked his personal welfare and went against Nizam Revenue officer and allowed to develop wet lands by conserving water bodies. Very instrumental in organizing and celebrating major festivals like Ugadhi, Dasara, Bonalu for the harmony of the village in all levels.Still people are fallowing tradition established by late Sri Kalvala Nrahari Rao.
3. Late Shri Kalvala Prabhakar Rao, Ex-Member of Parliament Rajya Sabha(1986–1992). in his tenure built a road bridge between Mothkur and Gundala mandal and Water resource to Agriculture for SCs
4. Late M.Ranga Reddy worked as Secretary Hyderabad Cricket Association and Vice President of BCCI
5. Konatham BakkaReddy, a popular Communist party leader.
6. Suddala Hanumanthu from Paladugu.
7. Pranayraj Vangari: Telugu Theatre Research Scholar, Telugu Wikipedia Administrator and Chief Secretary of "Popcorn Theatre" group.
