= Yellanki =

- Village
- Location in Telangana, India Yellanki (India)
- Coordinates: 17.290°N 79.026°E
- Country: India
- State: Telangana
- District: Yadadri Bhuvanagiri
- Mandal: Ramannapeta

Languages
  - Official: Telugu
- Time zone: UTC+5:30 (IST)
- Postal code: 508113
- Vehicle registration: TS

Yellanki or "Vellanki" or "Vellanky" or "Ellanki" is a village in Ramannapeta mandal of Yadadri Bhuvanagiri District of the Indian state of Telangana. It comes under a cluster of 80 villages in Yadadri Bhuvanagiri District of Telangana. The interesting combination of tradition, history, heritage, and modernity is widely known for Ikat- the most typical weaving village. It is famous for the cotton Ikat dress material.
