= Singaram, Yadadri Bhuvanagiri district =

Coordinates: 17°39′N 78°25′E

Singaram
- Village
- Interactive map of Singaram
- Country: India
- State: Telangana

Languages
  - Official: Telugu
- Time zone: UTC+5:30 (IST)
- Vehicle registration: TS
- Website: telangana.gov.in

Singaram is a village in Yadadri Bhuvanagiri district in Andhra Pradesh, India. It falls under Rajapeta mandal.
