= Peddakondur, Yadadri Bhuvanagiri =

Peddakondur is a village in the Choutuppal mandal of Yadadri Bhuvanagiri district in the state of Telangana, India.
