= Nelapatla =

Nelapatla Nyalapatla
- Village
- Country: India
- State: Telangana

Languages
  - Official: Telugu
- Time zone: UTC+5:30 (IST)
- Vehicle registration: AP

Nelapatla is a village in Yadadri Bhuvanagiri district in Telangana, India. It falls under Choutuppal mandal.
