= Beerla Ilaiah =

Indian politician

Beerla ilaiah
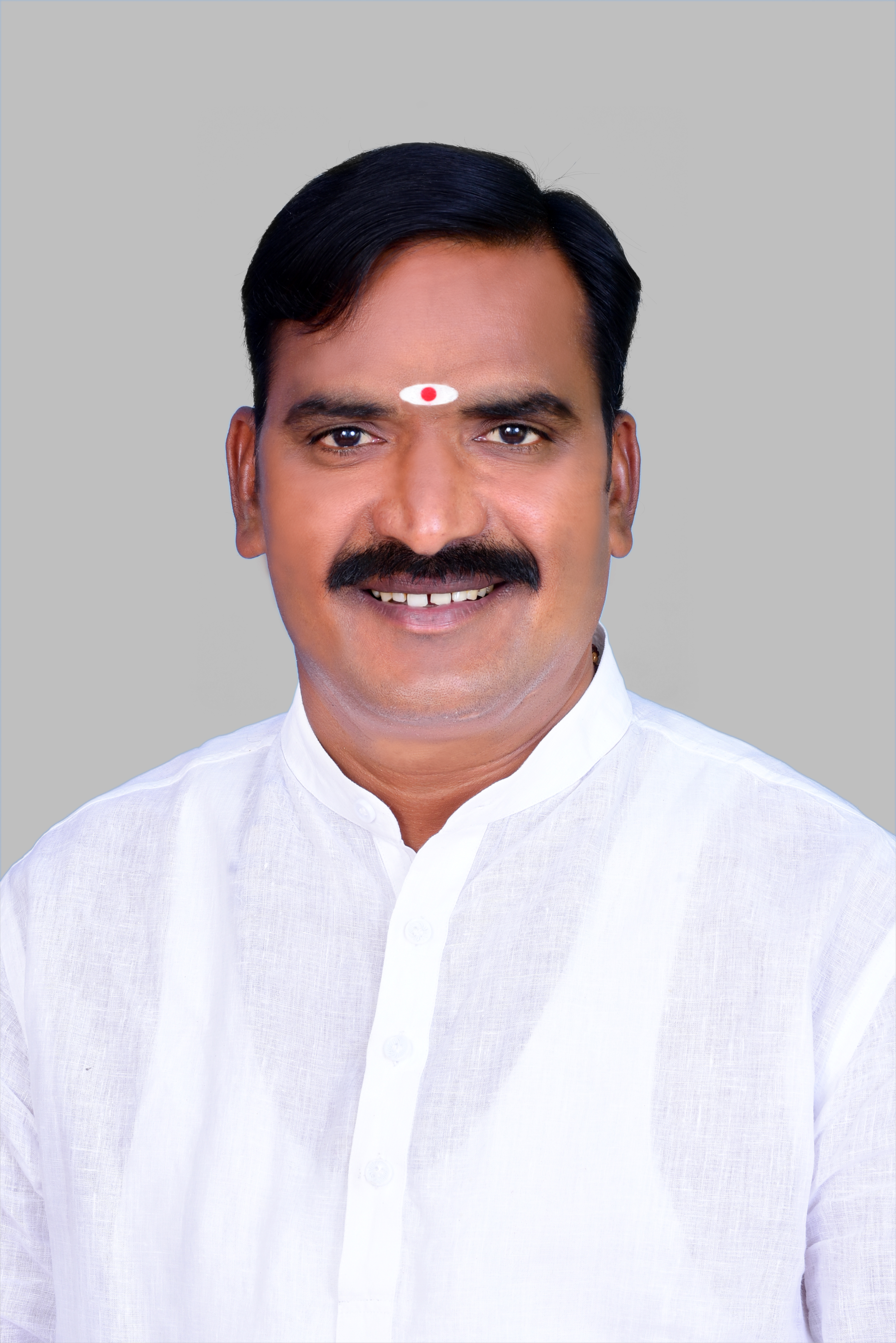

Member of the Telangana Legislative Assembly
- Incumbent
- Assumed office 2023
- Preceded by: Gongidi Sunitha
- Constituency: Alair

Personal details
- Born: 5 June 1975 (age 51) Saidapuram, Yadagirigutta, Yadadri Bhuvanagiri, Telangana
- Party: Indian National Congress
- Spouse: Beerla Anitha
- Children: 3
- Education: B.A, SLNS Degree college, Bhongir
- Occupation: Politician

Beerla Ilaiah (born 6 June 1975) is a politician from the state of Telangana. He is a member of the Telangana Legislative Assembly representing the Indian National Congress from Alair Assembly constituency in Yadadri Bhuvanagiri district.

In 2023 Telangana Legislative Assembly election, he contested as Indian National Congress party candidate and won the Alair seat by defeating Gongidi Sunitha of BRS by a margin of 49,636 votes. He polled 1,22,140 votes.

== Early life and education ==
Ilaiah was born in Saidapur Village in the Yadadri Bhuvanagiri district, Telangana. His parents are Beerla Somajaru and Beerla Buchamma. He belongs to Kuruma Community of BC-B. He completed his schooling at Zilla Parishad High School in Yadadri Bhuvanagiri in 1991. He did his graduation in arts at Sri Laxmi Narasimha Degree College in Bhongir in 2000. He married Beerla Anitha and together they have a son and two daughters.

== Career ==
As a student, Ilaiah joined National Students’ Union of India (NSUI), the student wing of the Congress party in SLNS Degree College. In 2006, he became the village Sarpanch of Saidapur. In 2008, he became the Mandal president of Yadadri-Bhuvanagiri. Later, he became the incharge of Alair Assembly constituency for Congress.

He made his debut as MLA in 2023 winning from Alair.

Ilaiah Was appointed as Yadadri Bhuvanagiri District Congress Committee (DCC) President on 22 November 2025.
