= Payanam =

Payanam may refer to:

- Payanam (1976 film), an Indian Tamil film
- Payanam (2011 film), an Indian film
- Payanam, Tamil Nadu, a village in India

== See also ==
- Prayanam (disambiguation)
