= Gongidi Suntiha =

Indian politician

Gongidi
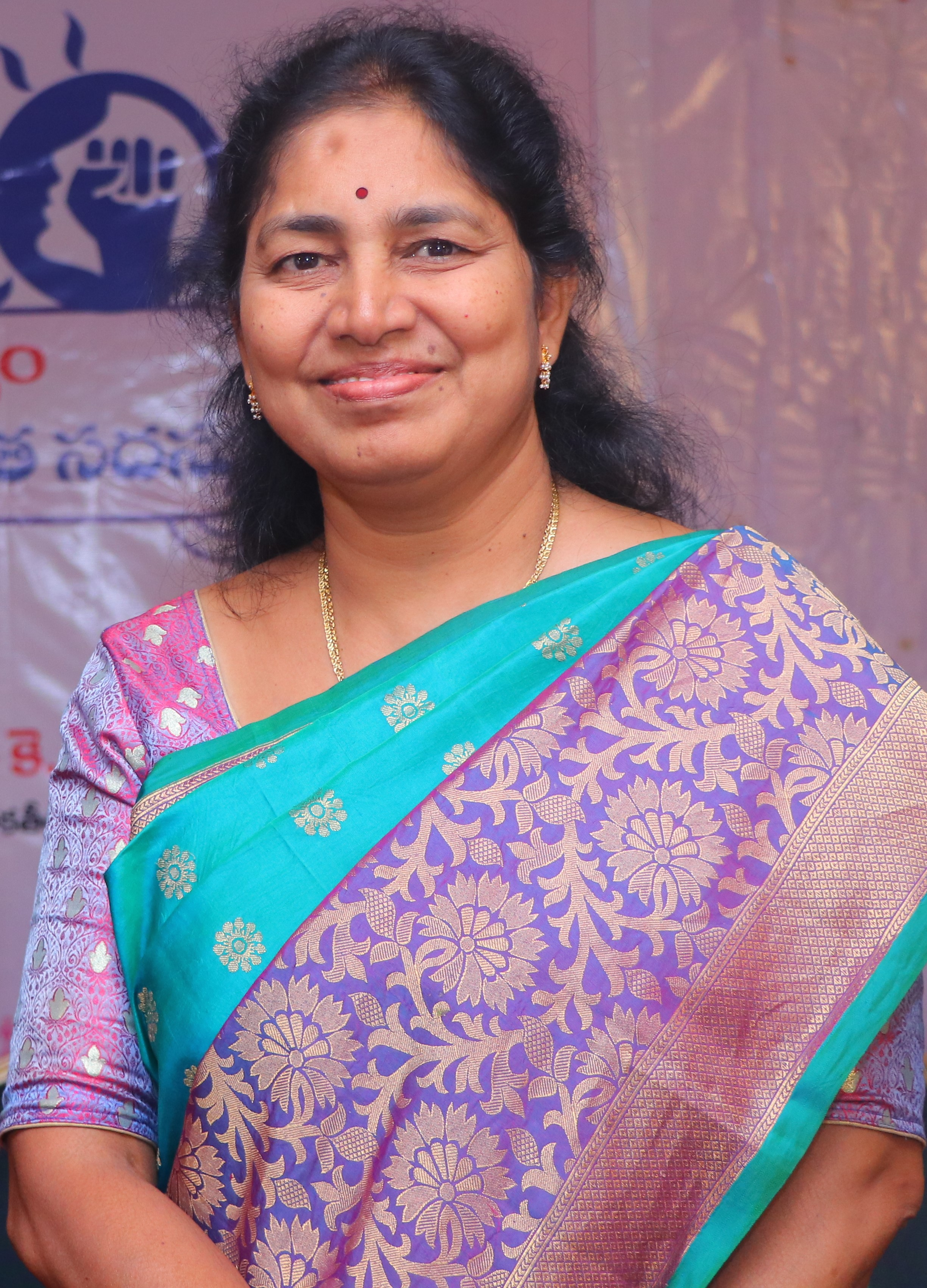

MLA and Government Whip Telangana Legislative Assembly
- In office 2 June 2014 – 03 December 2023
- Constituency: Alair, Telangana

Personal details
- Born: 16 August 1969 (age 57) Hyderabad, Andhra Pradesh, India
- Party: Telangana Rashtra Samithi
- Spouse: Mahender Reddy
- Education: Osmania University

Gongidi Sunitha Mahender Reddy (born 16 August 1969) is an Indian politician. She served as a member of the Telangana Legislative Assembly, representing the Alair constituency of Yadadri Bhuvanagiri district, from 2 June 2014 to 3 December 2023. She also served as Government Whip. She is a member of the Telangana Rashtra Samithi Party.

== Early life ==
Karingula Sunitha Rani was born on 16 August 1969 in Hyderabad, Telangana, to Sarala and Narsimha Reddy, in a lower-middle-class family. She did her schooling at Wesley Girls High School, Secunderabad, and B.Com. from Osmania University.

== Career ==
Sunitha Reddy worked for a private company during her graduation to support her family. Even after her marriage, she remained at her job until her political entry.

=== Political career ===
She entered politics in June 2001 by joining the TRS Party. She won as Yadagirigutta MPTC, MPP, from 2001 to 2006. She was State General Secretary of the TRS Party in 2002. She won the post of Sarpanch in 2006 – 2011 from Vangapally. She has been a member of TRS Politbureau since 2009.

She won the 2014 Assembly elections with a majority of over 30,000 over Budida Bixmaiah Goud of the Indian National Congress. In the 2018 Telangana Legislative Assembly election, she was re-elected with a majority of 33086 votes.

She also worked with an NGO, HELP, that works for the employability of underprivileged women.

== Political statistics ==
Election results
| Year | Election | Constituency | Party | Opponent | Majority | Result | Ref. |
|---|---|---|---|---|---|---|---|
| 2014 | Andhra Pradesh Legislative Assembly election | Alair | TRS | Budida Bikshamaiah Goud (INC) | 31148 | Won | |
| 2018 | Telangana Legislative Assembly election | Alair | TRS | Budida Bikshamaiah Goud (NC) | 33086 | Won | |
| 2024 | Telangana Legislative Assembly election | Alair | TRS | Beerla Ilaiah (INC) | 49636 | Lost | |

== Personal life ==
Sunitha married Gongidi Mahender Reddy, a TRS party member in 2001. She has two daughters.
