= Pallepahad =

Pallepahad is a small village in Amthmakur (M) Mandal of Yadadri district in Telangana, India.
