= Budida Bikshamaiah Goud =

Indian politician

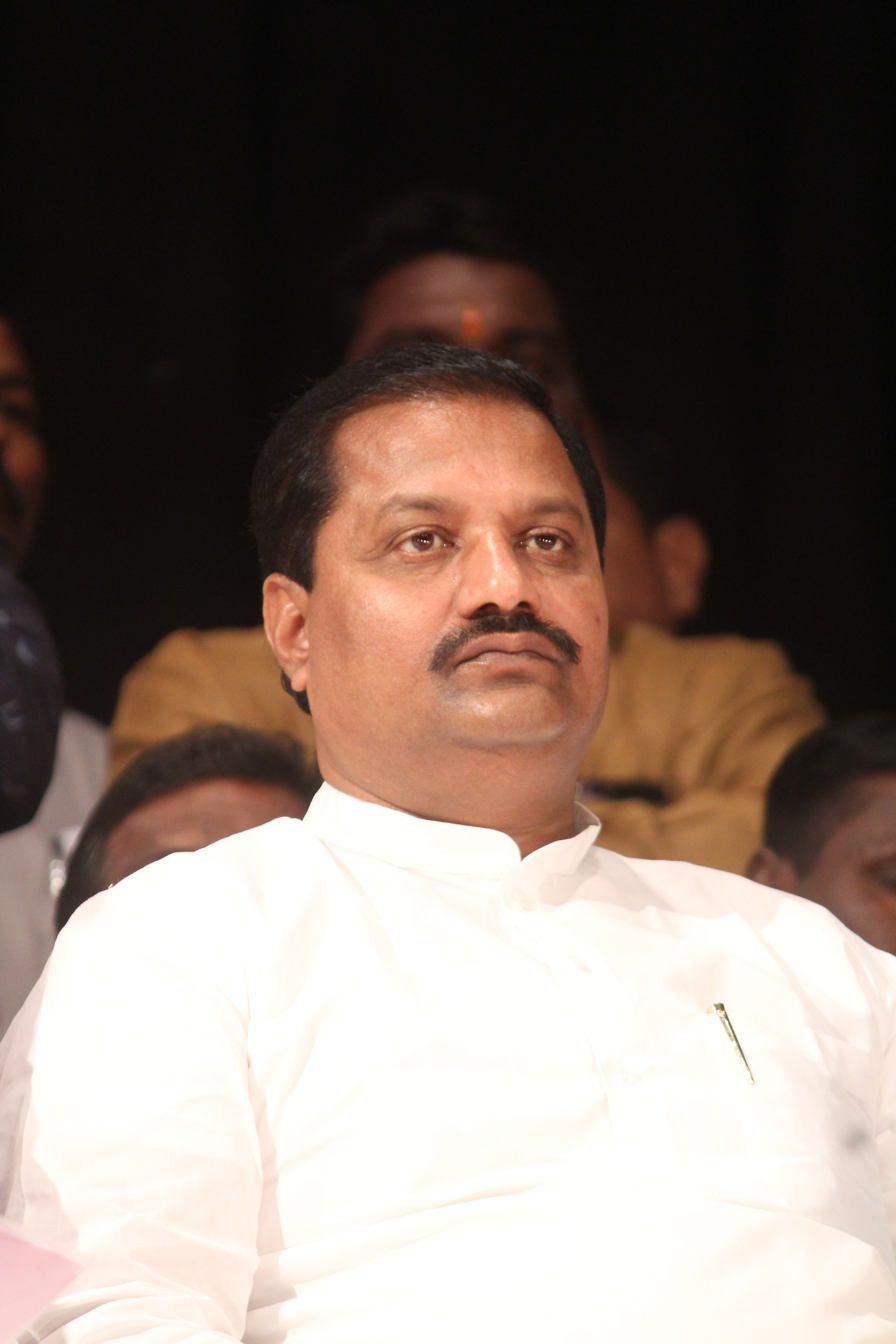

Member of Legislative Assembly
- In office 2009 - 2014
- Preceded by: Dr. Kududula Nagesh
- Succeeded by: Gongidi Suntiha
- Constituency: Alair

Personal details
- Born: 1971 (age 54–55) Parupally, Gundala Mandal, Yadadri Bhuvanagiri District, Telangana, India
- Party: Congress (before 27 March 2019); TRS (27 March 2019 – 5 April 2022); BJP (5 April 2022 - 20 October 2022); TRS (21 October 2022 -
- Spouse: Suvarna
- Children: Two
- Education: MBA
- Occupation: Politician

Budida Bikshamaiah Goud is an Indian politician. He was an MLA in Andhra Pradesh Legislative Assembly from Alair assembly constituency.

== Political career ==
Budida Bikshamaiah Goud's political career was started as party member in Indian National Congress party. He was elected as a member of the Andhra Pradesh Legislative Assembly in the 2009 election from Alair with a majority of 12902 votes. He had lost the same seat in the 2014 election and 2018 election against Gongidi Sunitha of Telangana Rashtra Samithi (TRS) consecutively. Bikshamaiah Goud later worked as Nalgonda, Yadadri-Bhongir DCC president and as AICC Member.

Budida Bikshamaiah Goud joined the ruling party TRS on 27 March 2019 in the presence of Party working president K. T. Rama Rao at Telangana Bhavan and later joined the Bharatiya Janata Party on 5 April 2022 in the presence of BJP national general secretary and Telangana BJP Incharge Tarun Chugh and BJP state president Bandi Sanjay Kumar in New Delhi. On 20 October 2022, he rejoined TRS, again in the presence of KTR.
