= Yellagiri =

Village in Telangana, India

Coordinates: 17°16′03″N 78°50′23″E

Yellagiri (ఎల్లగిరి) is a village in the Choutuppal mandal of Yadadri Bhuvanagiri district, in the Indian state of Telangana. It functions as a gram panchayat and is part of the rural local administrative structure under the Choutuppal block.

Yellagiri spans an area of approximately 370 hectares. The village lies about 8 km from its mandal headquarters, Choutuppal, and roughly 56 km from the district headquarters in Nalgonda (prior to district reorganization, though current district is Yadadri Bhuvanagiri).

The nearest major city is Hyderabad, located approximately 52 km away.

== Education and health ==
Yellagiri has at least one government primary school serving the local children. For higher education, the nearest colleges, including degree colleges and polytechnic institutes, are located in Choutuppal and Hyderabad. Health facilities are limited within the village; primary health centers and sub-centres are accessed in nearby settlements or Choutuppal.
