= Malkapur, Yadadri Bhuvanagiri =

Malkapur
- Village
- Location in Telangana, India Malkapur (India)
- Coordinates: 17.2410851°N 78.847465699999°E
- Country: India
- State: Telangana

Languages
  - Official: Telugu
- Time zone: UTC+5:30 (IST)
- Postal code: 508252
- Vehicle registration: TS
- Website: telangana.gov.in

Malkapur is a village in Yadadri Bhuvanagiri in Telangana, India. It falls under Choutuppal mandal.
