= Modumaigudem =

Modubavigudem
- Village
- Country: India
- State: Telangana

Population (2019)
  - Total: 500

Languages
  - Official: Telugu
- Time zone: UTC+5:30 (IST)
- Postal code: 508111
- Vehicle registration: TS
- Website: telangana.gov.in

Modubavigudem is a village in Yadadri district in Telangana, India. It falls under Atmakur (M) mandal.
