= Chandepally =

- Village
- Country: India
- State: Telangana state

Languages
  - Official: Telugu
- Time zone: UTC+5:30 (IST)

Chandepally is a village in Yadadri Bhuvanagiri district in Telangana state, India. It falls under Mootakondur mandal.
