= Koratikal =

Coordinates: 17°30′N 79°10′E

- Village
- Interactive map of Koratikal
- Country: India
- State: Andhra Pradesh

Population (2001)
  - Total: 3,000 above

Languages
  - Official: Telugu
- Time zone: UTC+5:30 (IST)
- Vehicle registration: Telangana

Koratikal is a village in Yadadri district in Telangana, India. It falls under Atmakur mandal.
