= Kranthi (Drill Man) =

Indian adventurer and television presenter (born 1990)

Panikera Kranthi
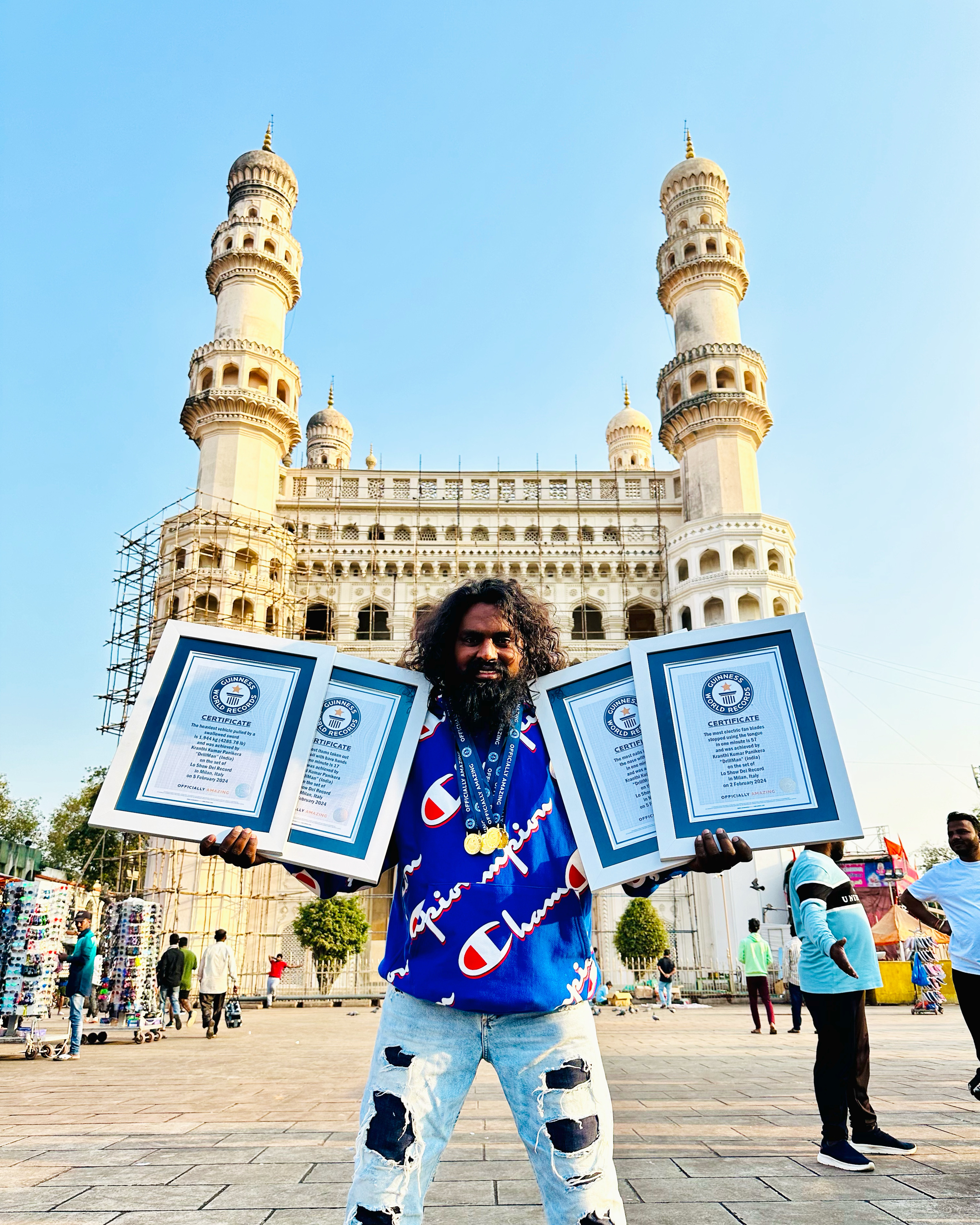
- Born: 30 June 1990 (age 36); Addagudur, Bhuvanagiri District, Telangana
- Occupations: Adventurer, Television presenter
- Years active: since 2012
- Known for: Adventure
- Parents: Panikera Sattaih (father); Mallamma (mother)

Kranthi Kumar Panikera (30 June 1990) also known as Drill Man is an Indian adventurer and television presenter. He first drew global attention at the Guinness World Records, in Milan, Italy for making 4 different Guinness records for his adventures. His adventure videos went viral globally after the Guinness World Records shared his adventure videos on the internet.

== Early life and education ==
Kranthi was born in a small village of Addagudur, Yadadri Mandal, Bhuvanagiri district of Telangana state. He currently resides in Suryapet. He has an elder brother and a younger sister. His father Panikera Sattaih is a daily wage laborer, and his mother Mallamma works in fields. Kranthi grew up witnessing his parents' struggles to manage household expenses.

Kranthi attended a government school in Addagudur and earned a diploma in teacher training from Vennela Education Institutions. After graduating with a bachelor's degree from Maharshi Degree College, he pursued a Diploma in Magic at Potti Sreeramulu Telugu University.

== Career ==
Kranthi began working at a young age to support his family, taking up part-time jobs, including one at a local food stall. It was during this time that he discovered his physical endurance. Encouraged by his unique abilities, he started practicing stunts under professional guidance, combining rigorous training with safety measures.

In 2012, Kranthi performed his first signature act that involved extreme precision and endurance, earning him the title “Drill Man of India.”

He went on to perform on popular television platforms, including India’s Got Talent, and represented India on international stages like America’s Got Talent and Tengo Talento Mucho Talento. He performed on over 300 television shows till 2025.

== Awards and recognition ==
- Yuvaratna-Saahasaveera Puraskaaram
- Akkineni Foundation of America for his contributions to the performing arts.

=== Guinness Records ===
- Heaviest vehicle pulled by a swallowed sword
- Most items taken out of hot oil with bare hands in one minute
- Most electric fan blades stopped using the tongue in one minute
- Most nails inserted into the nose with a hammer in one minute
