= Pranayraj Vangari =

Film Maker, Theatre Artiste, Researcher and Telugu Wikipedia Admin

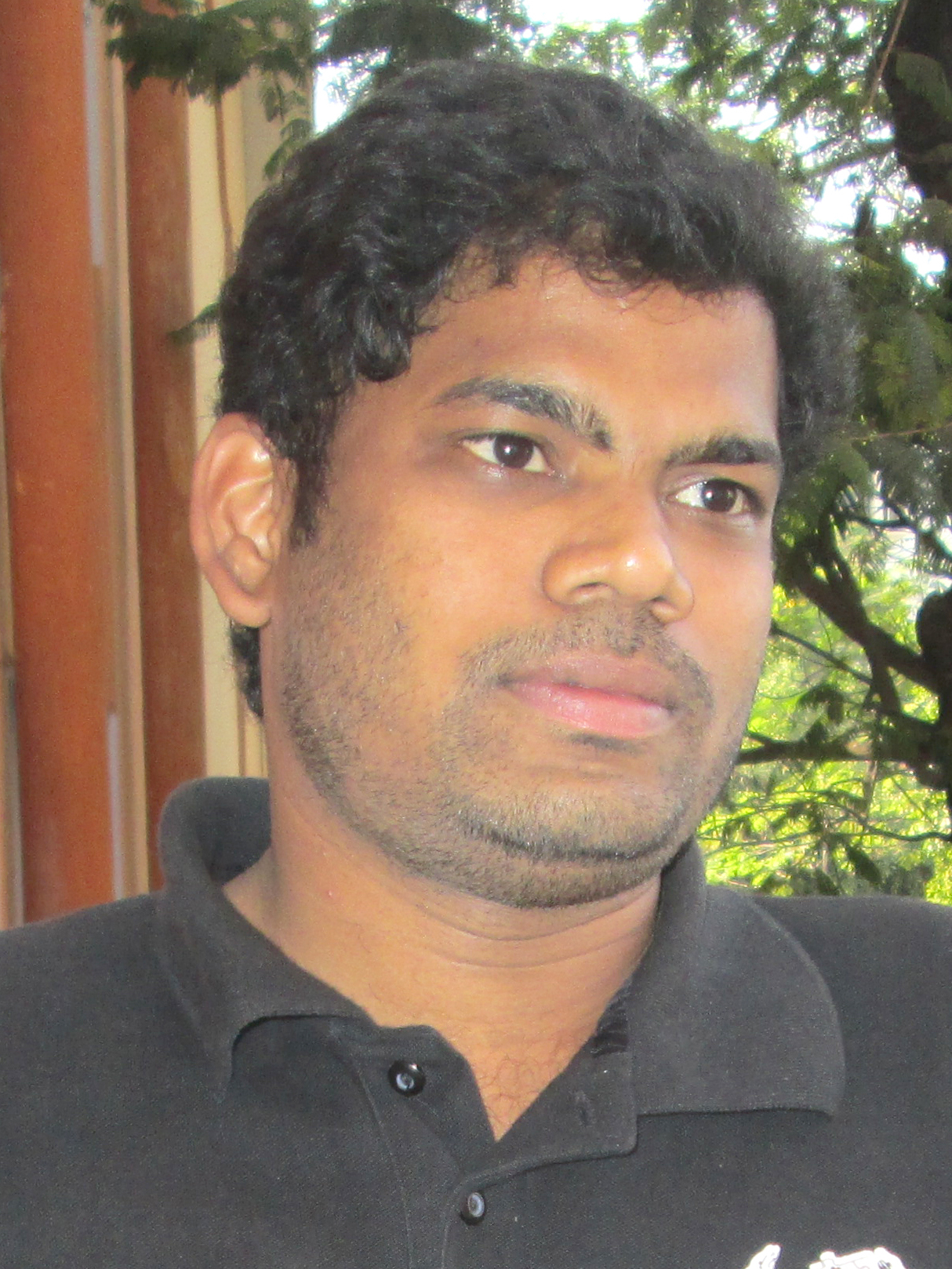
- Vangari in 2013
- Born: Mothkur, Yadadri Bhuvanagiri, Telangana
- Years active: Telugu Theatre and Cinema (2009 - Present); Telugu Wikipedia (8 March 2013 - Present)
- Known for: Theatre Research Scholar; Telugu Wikipedia Administrator

Pranayraj Vangari is a Telugu theatre research scholar and Telugu Wikipedia Administrator. With a concept name WikiVatsaram (transl. Wiki Year), he has written 365 new articles on Wikipedia in 365 days in a row. He is the first person to achieve this credit in the world. Continuing that trend, he completed 1000 articles in 1000 days as of June 4, 2019. Now he completed 1500 articles in 1500 days as of October 17, 2020.

== Birth ==
Pranayraj was born in Mothkur, Yadadri Bhuvanagari district in a weavers family. According to Pranayraj, his father is an admirer of films and his mother used to sing Bathukamma songs among others which attracted him towards the arts. He started listening to songs on the radio and practiced singing movie songs from lyrics books. Then he started performing in his school events, Vinayaka Chavithi celebrations and marriage ceremonies in his home town.

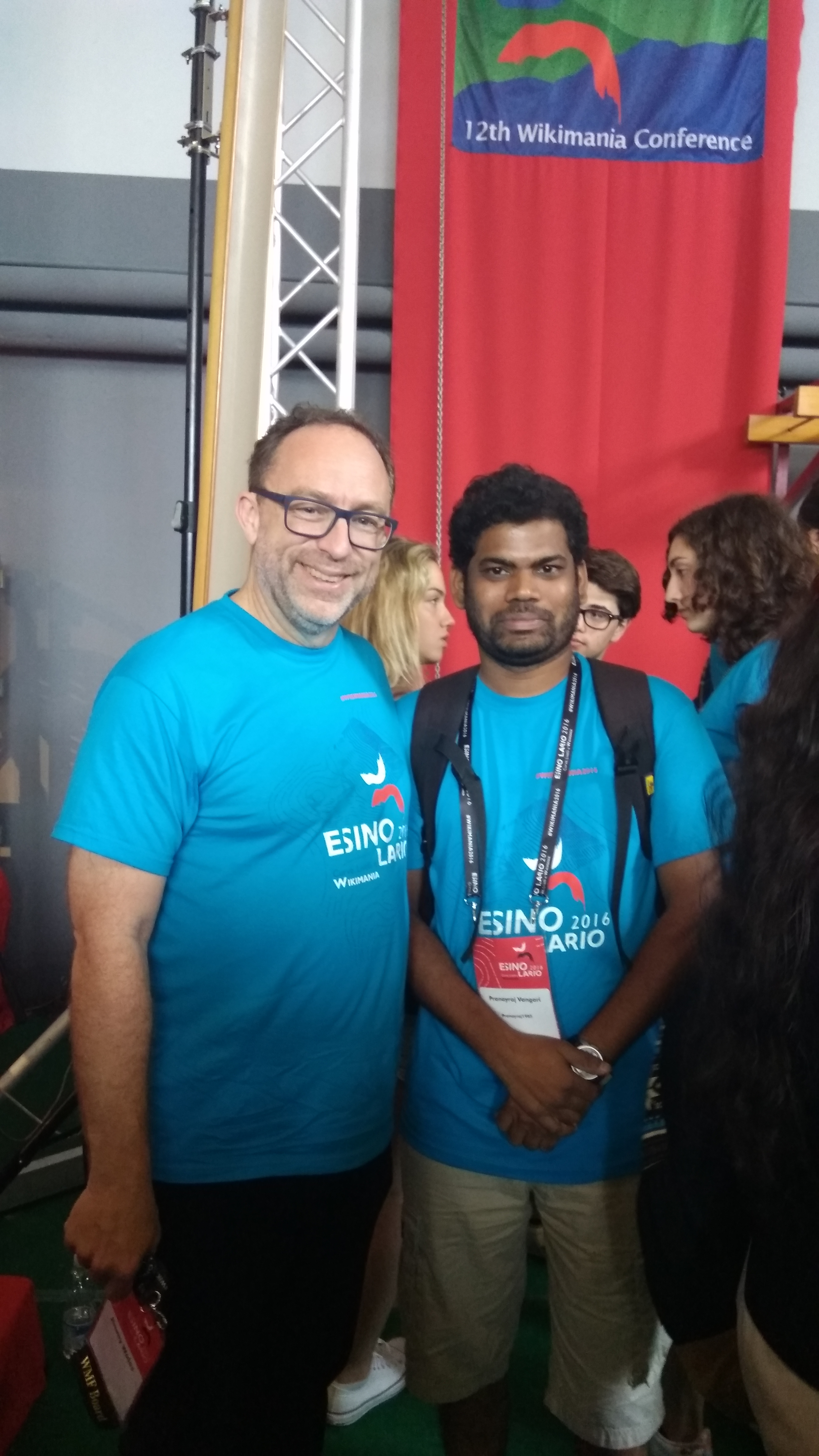
Pranayraj with Wikipedia co-founder Jimmy Wales in Esino Lario in Italy in Wikimania 2016

== Theatre ==
Pranayraj participated in Tifli International Theatre Festival for Children and Young Audience, in New Delhi during February 17–23, 2014. On March 20, he established Popcorn Theatre with the performance of Amma Cheppina Katha in Golden Threshold, Abids, Hyderabad by collaborating with some of his friends who are also working in Telugu Theatre. Through the Popcorn Theatre, he is working to attract Children and Youth towards Theatre.

== Contributions in Telugu Wikipedia ==
- Acted as General Secretary for 10th Anniversary Celebrations in 2014 hosted in Vijayawada and 11th Anniversary Celebration in 2015 hosted in Tirupathi.
- Campaigning about Telugu Wikipedia through various mediums to reach it to everyone. Recognizing Pranayraj's contributions, Wikimedia Foundation invited him to Wikipedia International Conference Wikimania 2016 held in Italy.
- Pranayraj completed 100 days – 100 Wiki articles challenge happening in various languages of Wikipedia worldwide. During 8 September 2016 – 16 December 2016 he had written 100 wiki articles.
- He became the first wikipedian in the world by writing 365 wiki articles in 365 days under WikiVastaram concept. Starting on 8 September 2016, writing a wiki article every day, he completed WikiVastaram on 7 September 2017.
- On 4 June 2019, he completed 1000 days - 1000 Wiki Articles.
