= Anajipuram =

- village
- Location in Telangana, India Anajipuram (India)
- Coordinates: 17.4547582°N 78.9044609°E
- Country: India
- State: Telangana
- District: Yadadri Bhuvanagiri district

Languages
  - Official: Telugu
- Time zone: UTC+5:30 (IST)
- PIN: 508285
- Telephone code: 08685
- Vehicle registration: TG
- Lok Sabha constituency: Bhongiri
- Vidhan Sabha constituency: Bhongiri
- Website: telangana.gov.in

Anajipuram is a village in Yadadri district of the Indian state of Telangana. It is administered under Bhongir mandal of Bhongir revenue division.
