= Valigonda =

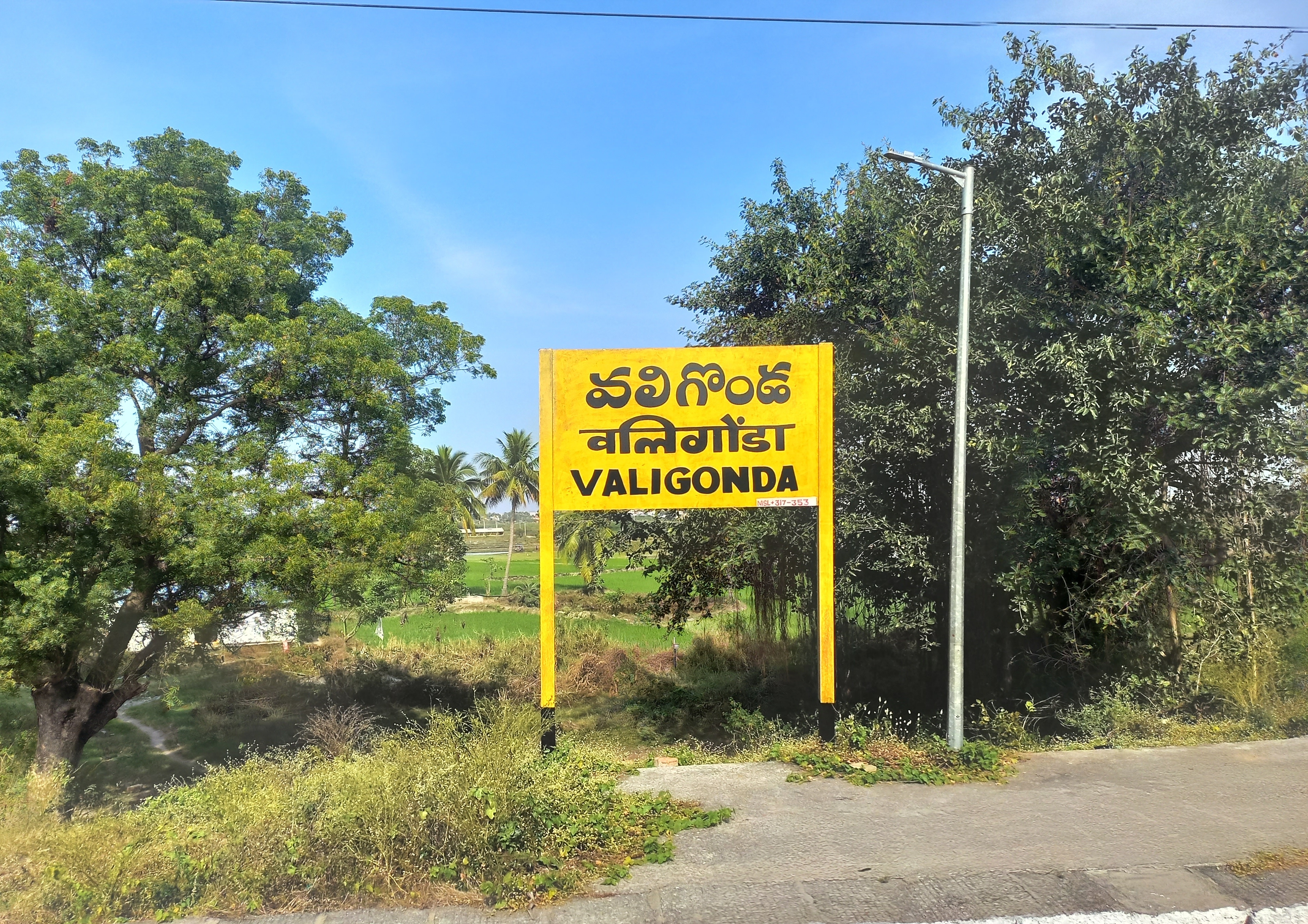

- Location in Telangana, India Valigonda (India)
- Coordinates: 17.3667°N 79.0500°E
- Country: India
- State: Telangana
- District: Bhuvanagiri

Government
  - Type: Panchyat raj department
  - Body: Kumbam Anil Kumar Reddy; Beerla Ilaiah; Chamala Kiran Kumar Reddy; Komatireddy Venkat Reddy; N. Uttam Kumar Reddy

Area
  - Total: 9.59 km^{2} (3.70 sq mi)
- Elevation: 291 m (955 ft)

Population (2011)
  - Total: 7,324
  - Density: 764/km^{2} (1,980/sq mi)

Languages
  - Official: Telugu
- Time zone: UTC+5:30 (IST)
- Postal code: 508112
- Vehicle registration: TG-30
- Climate: hot (Köppen)
- Website: telangana.gov.in

Valigonda is a census town in Yadadri Bhuvanagiri district of the Indian state of Telangana. It is located on the banks of Musi River, in Valigonda mandal of Bhongir division. It was near the place where the Valigonda rail accident occurred.

== Geography ==
Valigonda is located at 17.3667°N 79.0500°E. It has an average elevation of 291 metres (958 ft).

== Notable people ==
- V. Eshwaraiah, one of the justices of Andhra Pradesh High Court, was born in Nemalikaluva village of this mandal.
