= Shenbagavalli Amman Temple, Payanam =

Sree Chenbagavalli Amman Temple is dedicated to Chenbagavalli Amman, an incarnation of Goddess Parvati. Within the ‘Mandapam,’ the sanctum is situated below the vimana and is supported by 17 pillars that coordinate of the ‘Chenbagavalli Amma’.

The deity of the temple is postured to hold a trident, and a child in her hands. A shrine of the temple is dedicated to hard working people of payanam, who put tremendous effort to build this temple.

A Sacred Fig, (Ficus religiosa, or Bo-Tree), Chenabagavalli nursery school and a Banyan tree are situated outside the main temple. This temple is maintained by Chenbagavalli Amma trust. And this trust helps poor people in Payanam.

In the end of February or the beginning of March, the famous annual Festival is held at this site. During this festival, the Goddess is taken out on a procession throughout the Marthandam town and the Payanam village.

The temple committee :President M.Sasi Nadar.MA MEd PhD, Secretary :C.Rajan, Panchayat Councilor, Assistant Secretary : K. Ravi. Vice President: Swamydhas, Treasurer : T. Rajendran
