= Pranayam =

Pranayam (lit. 'affection' or 'love' in Indian languages) may refer to:

- Pranayam (2011 film), a 2011 Indian Malayalam-language romantic drama film by Blessy
- Pranayam (2024 film), a 2024 Indian Kannada-language romantic thriller film by S. Dattatreya
- Pranayam (TV series), a 2015 Indian Malayalam-language TV series on Asianet

== See also ==
- Pranay, an Indian male given name
- Pranayama (lit. 'life extending'), breathing exercises in Yoga
- Pranayamanithooval, 2002 Indian Malayalam-language film by Thulasidas
- Pranaya Vilasam, a 2023 Indian Malayalam-language romantic film by Nikhil Muraly
- Pranaya Meenukalude Kadal, a 2019 Indian Malayalam-language romantic drama film by Kamal
- Pranayakalam, a 2007 Indian Malayalam-language romantic film directed by Uday Ananthan
- Pranaya Nilavu, a 1999 Indian Malayalam-language film directed by Vinayan
- Pranayavarnangal, a 1998 Indian Malayalam-language romantic film directed by Sibi Malayil
- Pranayavarnangal (TV series), a 2021 Indian Malayalam-language TV series on Zee Keralam
