= Motakondur =

- Village
- Location in Telangana, India
- Coordinates: 17.6500°N 79.0500°E
- Country: India
- State: Telangana
- District: Yadadri Bhuvanagiri
- Mandal: Motakondur

Government
  - Type: Panchayati raj
  - Body: Motakondur gram panchayat
  - Sarpanch: Srilatha 2019 elections

Area
  - Total: 4,276 ha (10,570 acres)

Population (2011)
  - Total: 5,954
  - Density: 139.2/km^{2} (360.6/sq mi)

Languages
  - Official: Telugu
- Time zone: UTC+5:30 (IST)
- Vehicle registration: TG

Motakondur is a village & Mandal in Yadadri Bhuvanagiri district of the Indian state of Telangana. It is located in Motakondur mandal of Bhongir revenue division.
