= Samsthan Narayanapur =

- Village
- Location in Telangana, India
- Coordinates: 17.1622°N 78.8817°E
- Country: India
- State: Telangana
- District: Bhuvanagiri
- Elevation: 349 m (1,145 ft)

Population (2011)
  - Total: 7,927

Languages
  - Official: Telugu
- Time zone: UTC+5:30 (IST)
- PIN: 508253
- Vehicle registration: TG
- Climate: hot (Köppen)

Samsthan Narayanapur is a Mandal in Yadadri Bhuvanagiri district of Telangana State, India. Narayanapur Mandal Headquarters is Narayanapur town. It belongs to Telangana region. It is located 39 km towards west from District headquarters Bhongir.

Narayanapur Mandal is bounded by Choutuppal Mandal towards North, Manchal Mandal towards west, Marrigudem Mandal towards South, Munugode Mandal towards East. Bhongiri, Hyderabad, Devarakonda, Jangaon are the nearby to Narayanapur.

Narayanapur consist of 77 Villages and 14 Panchayats. Kothulapuram is the smallest Village and Narayanapur is the biggest Village. It is in the 322 m elevation(altitude). This Place is in the border of the Nalgonda District and Rangareddi District. Rangareddi District Manchal is west towards this place.

Hyderabad, Nagarjunsagar, Nagarjunakonda (Nagarjuna Sagar Dam), Medak, Warangal (Orugallu) are the nearby important tourist destinations to see.

== Puttapaka ==
Narayanapur is mandal HQ (mdl code-36) in Nalgonda District, Telangana.

There are 14 villages in this mandal:

- ALLAMDEVICHERUVU
- RACHAKONDA
- MAHAMMADABAD
- GUDDI MALKAPURAM
- KOTHULAPURAM
- CHIMIRIYALA
- NARAYANAPUR
- KOTHA GUDEM
- KANKANAL GUDEM
- SARVAIL
- GUJJA
- PUTTAPAKA
- JANGAM
- VAILA PALLE
- CHILLAPURAM
- PALLAGATTU THANDA

== Geography ==
Narayanpur is located at 17.1622°N 78.8817°E. It has an average elevation of 349 metres (1148 ft).

== Demographics ==
According to Indian census, Telugu is the Local Language here. Also People Speaks Urdu. Total population of Narayanapur Mandal is 41,064 living in 9,055 Houses, Spread across total 77 villages and 14 panchayats. Males are 20,963 and Females are 20,101.

=== Weather and Climate of Narayanapur Mandal ===
It is too Hot in summer. Narayanapur summer highest day temperature is in between 28 °C to 46 °C.

Average temperatures of January is 25 °C, February is 26 °C, March is 30 °C, April is 32 °C, May is 35 °C

== How to reach Samsthan Narayanapur mandal ==
=== By Rail ===
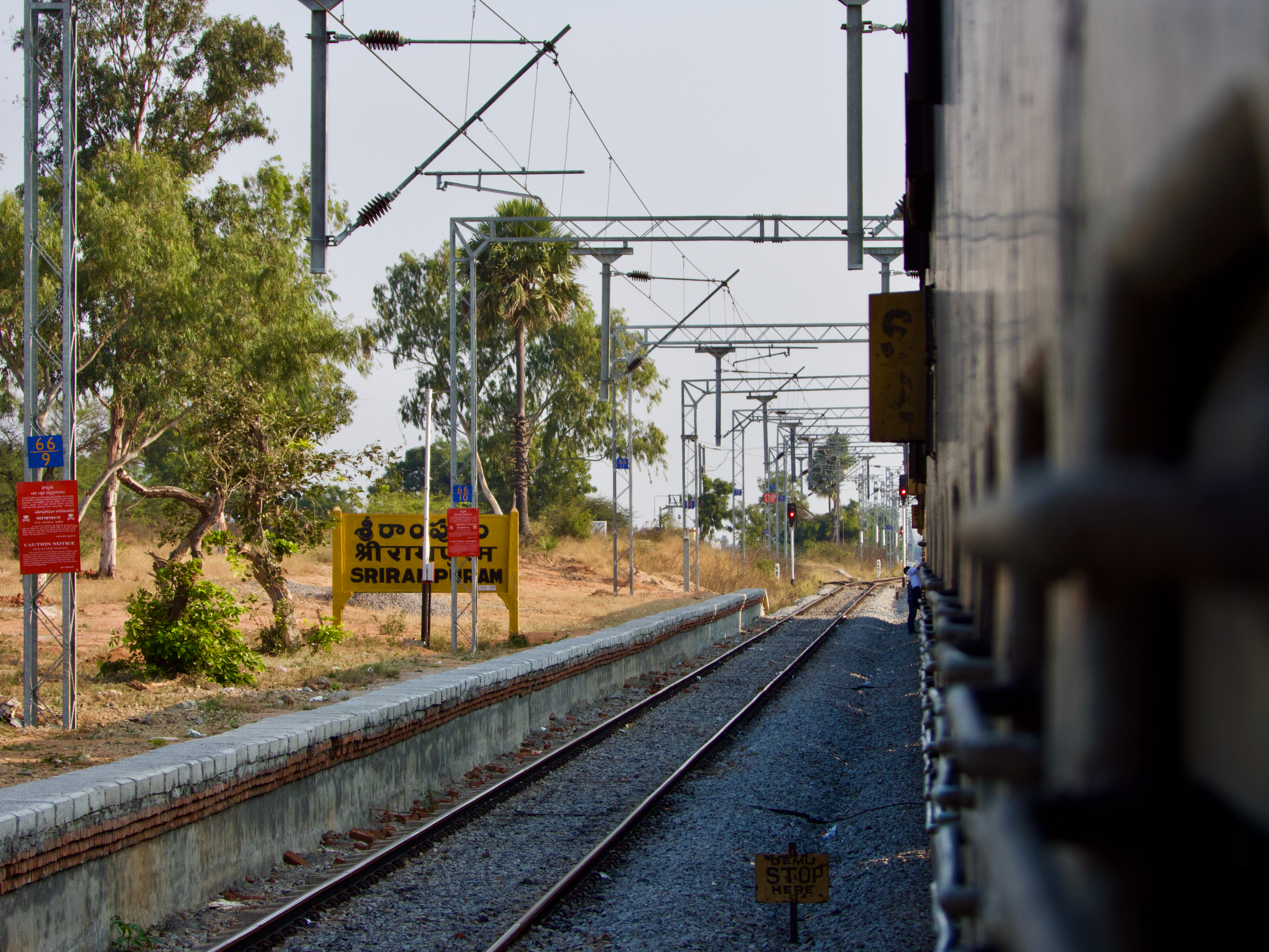
Srirampuram railway station

There is no railway station near to Narayanapur Mandal in less than 10 km. Nalgonda Rail Way Station (near to Nalgonda), Srirampuram Rail Way Station (near to Nalgonda) are the Rail way stations reachable from near by towns. However Secunderabad Jn Rail Way Station is amajor railway station 56 km from Narayanapur.

=== By Road ===
Choutuppal is the nearby town and It has road connectivity to Narayanapur.
