= Payanam, Tamil Nadu =

Payanam
- village
- Country: India
- State: Tamil Nadu
- District: KanyaKumari

Languages
  - Official: Tamil Malayalam
- Time zone: UTC+5:30 (IST)
- PIN: 629179
- Telephone code: 04651
- Vehicle registration: TN 74 & TN 75
- Nearest city: Marthandam
- Lok Sabha constituency: Nagercoil
- Vidhan Sabha constituency: Vilavancode

Payanam is a village in the Kanyakumari district, Tamil Nadu next to Unnamalaikadai, in India. The total population is around 2000). The major religions practiced in the village are Hinduism and Christianity.

Payanam tops as a largest agricultural village of unnamalaikadai town panchayat, by contributing 35% of its total food need. The village is situated 2 kilometres (1.2 mi) from Marthandam and part of unnamalaikadai town panchayat. The area includes a river, ponds and hills.

The brick industries, rubber groves, coconut plantations and paddy fields play main role in the economy of the village. A river links remote villages with Payanam with the help of boat service. The boat service provides a cheap and economical mode of transport to remote villages like Thikkurichy, Vallakadavu, Nellikkai villai, ootichai, a popular Thikukurichy Shivan temple and a catholic church.

Payanam is also called "temple village", referring to the temples built for each family in the village.

The Sree Chenbagavalli Amman Temple and Sree Chenbaga primary school are situated at the junction itself. Follow Shenbagavalli Amman temple payanam link to know cultural heritage of enchanting Chenbagavalli Amman temple. Chenbagavalli auditorium is another feature of Payanam village, built to reduce the heavy marriage expenses suffered by Payanam people. Back to marthandam down below 500 yards off from Payanam junction, there exist a Christian holy shrine, a holy gathering place for 25% Christians in Payanam village.

Jaya Seelan is the village president and C. Rajan is the village councilor.
