= Arutla Ramchandra Reddy =

Indian politician

Arutla Ramchandra Reddy was an Indian freedom fighter. He represented Bhongir constituency from 1962 to 1967. He was among the leaders and fighters in the armed freedom struggle against the rule of Nizam (the last ruler of the erstwhile princely state of Hyderabad). The communists joined with the poor peasants in the present day Telangana state during the 1940s to overthrow the Nizam's feudal regime. It was a sub-movement in the larger independence struggle of India, his wife Arutla Kamala Devi was involved in Freedom Struggle and she too was a Member of Legislative Assembly for 3 terms.

== Early life ==
Arutla Ramchandra Reddy was born in Kolanpak in Alair mandal of Nalgonda district.

== Career ==
Arutla Ramachandra Reddy participated in the armed struggle against the tyrannical regime of the Nizam, during which time he underwent rigorous imprisonment and led underground life.

== Personal life ==
Arutla Ramchandra Reddy was married to Arutla Kamaladevi.
