= Arutla Kamala Devi =

Indian politician

Member of Andhra Pradesh Legislative Assembly
- In office 1952–1967
- Preceded by: Position created
- Succeeded by: Anreddy Punna Reddy
- Constituency: Alair

Personal details
- Born: 1920 Manthapuri
- Died: 1 January 2001 (aged 80–81)
- Party: Communist Party of India
- Spouse: Arutla Ramchandra Reddy

Arutla Kamala Devi is an indian politician, freedom fighter and leader of Communist Party of India. She represented Alair constituency from 1952 to 1967 with 3 consecutive terms. She was among the leaders and fighters in the armed freedom struggle against the rule of Nizam (the last ruler of the erstwhile princely state of Hyderabad). The communists joined with the poor peasants in the present day Telangana state during the 1940s to overthrow the Nizam's feudal regime. It was a sub movement in the larger independence struggle of India. She is the first woman opposition leader in India.
