= Alair =

- Town
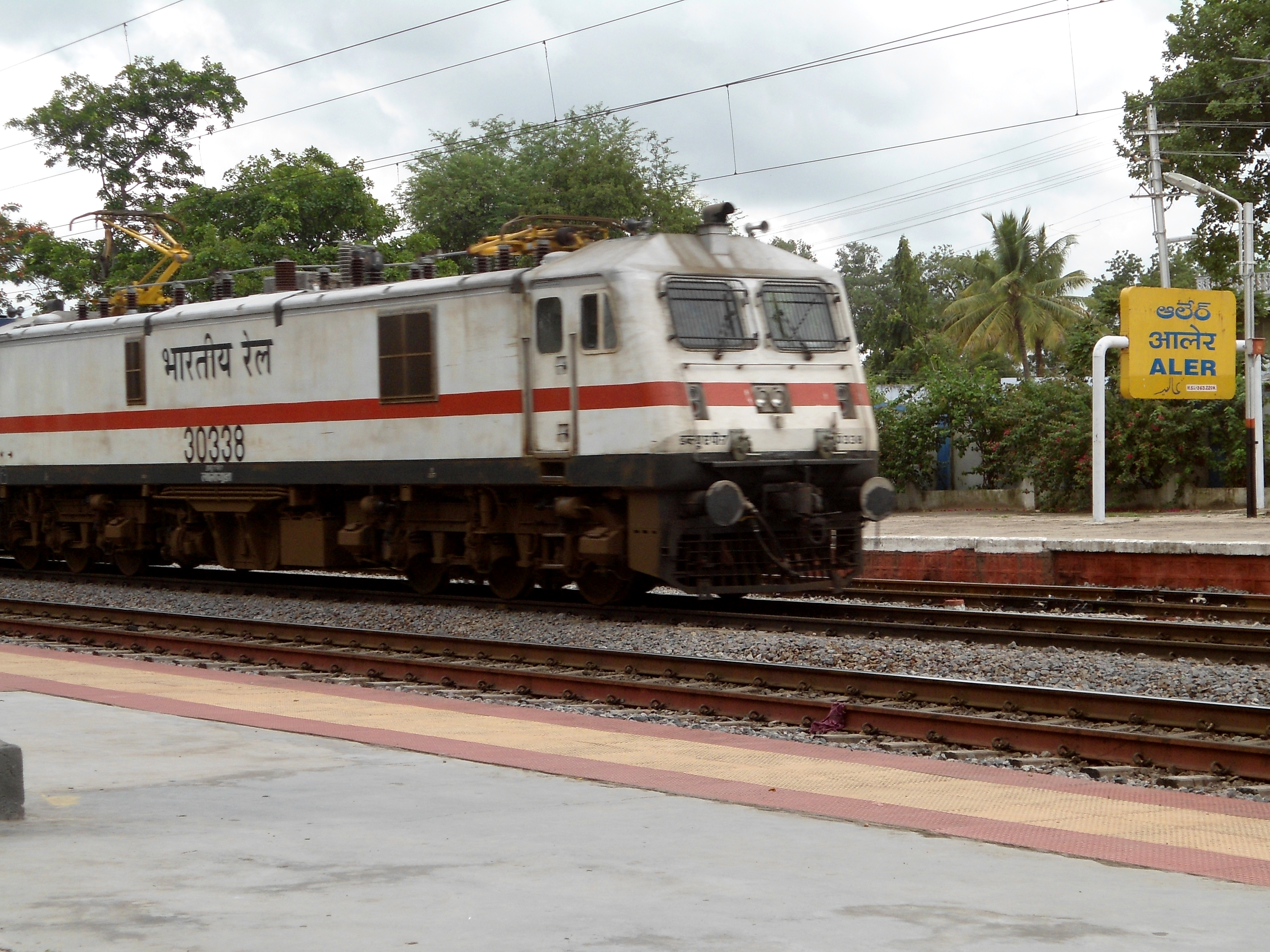
- AP Express crossing Alair Railway Station

- Location in Telangana, India
- Coordinates: 17.65°N 79.05°E
- Country: India
- State: Telangana
- District: Yadadri Bhuvanagiri
- Mandal: Alair
- Revenue Division: Bhongir
- Incorporated (town): 1 August 2018

Government
  - Type: Municipal council
  - Body: Alair Municipality

Area
  - Total: 2,942 ha (7,270 acres)

Population (2011)
  - Total: 18,054
  - Density: 613.7/km^{2} (1,589/sq mi)

Languages
  - Official: Telugu
- Time zone: UTC+5:30 (IST)
- PIN: 508101
- Area code: +91–8685
- Vehicle registration: TG 30
- Website: alairmunicipality.telangana.gov.in

Alair or Aleru is a town in Alair(ఆలేరు) mandal of Bhongir revenue division in Yadadri Bhuvanagiri district of the Indian state of Telangana. It is a municipality and one of the constituencies in the Yadadri Bhuvanagiri district.

== Geography ==
Aler is located at 17.6500°N 79.0500°E. It has an average elevation of 361 meters (1187 ft).

== Government and politics ==
Alair municipality is the local self-government, constituted on 1 August 2018, by merging Alair and Bahadurpeta gram panchayats. Alair falls under Alair assembly constituency of Telangana Legislative Assembly, which is one of the segments of Bhongir Lok Sabha constituency.
