= M.Turkapally =

M.Turkapally Yadadri Bhuvanagiri
- Village
- Interactive map of M.Turkapally
- Coordinates: 17°39′11.899″N 78°49′40.872″E
- Country: India
- State: Telangana
- District: Yadadri Bhuvanagiri

Area
  - Total: 5.18 km^{2} (2.00 sq mi)

Population (2011)
  - Total: 2,571
  - Density: 496/km^{2} (1,290/sq mi)

Languages
  - Official: Telugu
- Time zone: UTC+5:30 (IST)
- Postal code: 508115
- Vehicle registration: 'TS-30'
- Climate: hot (Köppen)
- Website: telangana.gov.in

M.Turkapally (or Mannevari Turkapalle) is a village in yadadri bhuvanagiri district of the Indian state of Telangana. It is located in Turkapally mandal of Bhongir division.
