= Yadagirigutta =

Yadagirigutta Yadadri
- Town
- Nickname: Temple City
- Location in Telangana, India Yadagirigutta (India)
- Coordinates: 17°35′11″N 78°56′46″E
- Country: India
- State: Telangana
- District: Bhuvanagiri

Area
  - Total: 12.74 km^{2} (4.92 sq mi)

Population (2011)
  - Total: 15,232
  - Density: 1,196/km^{2} (3,097/sq mi)

Languages
  - Official: Telugu
- Time zone: UTC+5:30 (IST)
- Postal code: 508126
- Vehicle registration: TS 30 (RTA YBG)

Yadagirigutta is a census town in Alair Assembly constituency of Yadadri Bhuvanagiri district of the Indian state of Telangana. It is a temple town as the famous Lakshmi Narasimha Temple is situated here. It is located at a distance of 16 km from the district headquarters Bhuvanagiri which is a part of Hyderabad Metropolitan Region and 65 km from Uppal, a major suburb of Hyderabad. The proposed Hyderabad Regional Ring Road passes through Yadagirigutta.

== Demographics ==
As of 2001 India census, Yadagirigutta had a population of 13,267. Males constitute 50% of the population and females 50%. Yadagirigutta has an average literacy rate of 61%, less than the national average of 74.04%: male literacy is 71%, and female literacy is 52%. In Yadagirigutta, 13% of the population is under 6 years of age.

== Transport ==
Yadagirigutta is about 65 km from Mahatma Gandhi Bus Station and 82 km from Rajiv Gandhi International Airport at Hyderabad.
