= Pranay Gupte =

American journalist (born 1948)

- Born: 1948; Bombay (now Mumbai), India
- Died: December 2025 (aged 76–77); Florida
- Education: Brandeis University; Columbia University Graduate School of Journalism
- Occupations: Journalist; writer; documentary film producer; television; radio commentator
- Writing career
- Years active: 1970s–present

Pranay Gupte (born 1948) is an American journalist of Indian origin, writer of biographical and non-fiction books, documentary film producer, and television and radio commentator. He worked for many years as a New York Times staff reporter and international correspondent in Africa, the Middle East, and Asia, and later as a global affairs columnist for Newsweek. In 1991, he founded The Earth Times, a newspaper that focused on environmental affairs, economic development, and issues relating to population and family planning. He has written many books, including Mother India: A Political Biography of Indira Gandhi, which appeared in 1992 and in a second edition in 2009.

== Early life and education ==
Gupte was born in Bombay (now Mumbai) in 1948, and attended St. Xavier's School. His father, Balkrishna T. Gupte, was a lawyer and former executive at the Central Bank of India. His mother, Dr. Charusheela Gupte, was a professor of Sanskrit and Marathi at the University of Mumbai and a prolific writer of novels and plays. Both parents died in 1985. In 2016, Gupte published a tribute to them in the Huffington Post, in which he reflected especially on the accomplishments of his mother, who rose to professional success after escaping from a childhood of deep poverty and who published her fortieth novel in the Marathi language in the year of her death. He also reflected on his own emigration from India to the United States, and on the migrant's nostalgia, ambivalence, and uncertainty vis-à-vis the family and home left behind. He has continued to write about Mumbai, where a public square has been named in his mother's honor.

Pranay Gupte came to the United States in 1967, when he won a scholarship to attend Brandeis University as an undergraduate. After earning BA degrees in political science and economics from Brandeis in 1970, he attended Columbia University Graduate School of Journalism.

== Career ==
Gupte worked for The New York Times for fifteen years. By 1975, as a local staff reporter, he was covering news for Suffolk County on Long Island; later, he was an international correspondent in Africa, the Middle East, and Asia. He then moved to Newsweek International and wrote as one of its global affairs columnists for eighteen years. Over the years, Gupte has contributed columns to many other news venues, too, such as Forbes, Asian Finance, The Atlantic Monthly, Reader's Digest, People, The Cricketer (London), The Hindu (Chennai), and The Straits Times Singapore.

Gupte was also a columnist and business editor of The New York Sun and The Daily Star (Beirut). In the late 1980s and early 1990s, he produced documentary films for PBS, Discovery Channel, and other outlets. Several of these documentaries profiled countries, for example, Belize, Malaysia, and Nepal. His documentaries also covered topics ranging from world banking to working women. He published op-eds in venues ranging from The Wall Street Journal and The Philadelphia Inquirer to the International Herald Tribune and The Los Angeles Times. He appeared on television as a guest commentator for CNN, Fox News, PBS, ABC and NBC, and on radio for BBC and NPR. He hosted a radio interview show on for PBS in New York. Gupte also became Editor-in-Chief of Al Arabiya International Network's English-language website, and created the site's Web TV.

In 1991, he founded The Earth Times, a newspaper that appeared once every two weeks and that focused on environmental affairs, economic development, and issues relating to population and family planning. The Earth News appeared until 2003. In 1999, he launched an associated not-for-profit book division called Earth Times Books. The first book to appear in its series, an anthology called All of Us: Births and a Better Life: Population, Development and Environment in a Globalized World, included a contribution from Bill Clinton. In 2012, Gupte published an obituary and tribute to his former boss, New York Times publisher Arthur Ochs Sulzberger, noting that Sulzberger was the first donor to The Earth Times when Gupte started it.

From 2007 to 2011, Gupte was senior media advisor to His Highness Sheikh Mohammed bin Rashid Al Maktoum, Vice President and Prime Minister of the United Arab Emirates, and Ruler of Dubai. In this position, Gupte helped Sheikh Maktoum to write his memoirs and English-language articles for the press. Gupte served as a media advisor to organizations including the United Nations and World Bank, and moderated or featured in panels at the Davos conference.

Gupte is an elected life member of the Council on Foreign Relations in New York.

His books include Mother India: A Political Biography of Indira Gandhi (1992, 2009); The Crowded Earth: People and the Politics of Population (1984); and Global Emirates: An Anthology of Tolerance and Enterprise (2009).
