= Rajapet =

Rajapeta
- Village
- Location in Telangana, India Rajapeta (India)
- Coordinates: 17°44′N 78°55′E
- Country: India
- State: Telangana
- District: Bhuvanagiri

Area
  - Total: 7.98 km^{2} (3.08 sq mi)

Population (2011)
  - Total: 4,902
  - Density: 614/km^{2} (1,590/sq mi)

Languages
  - Official: Telugu
- Time zone: UTC+5:30 (IST)
- Postal code: 508105
- Vehicle registration: 'TS-30'
- Website: https://rajapeta.com/

Rajapeta is a historic location, popularly known as Samsthan Rajapeta, which has forts of Indian state of Telangana located in Yadadri Bhuvanagiri district.

Rajapeta Sansthan was one of the 14 princely states of Hyderabad during the Nizam's rule.
