= Gundala mandal, Yadadri Bhuvanagiri district =

Gundala
- Village
- Location in Telangana, India Gundala (India)
- Coordinates: 17°30′35″N 79°17′40″E
- Country: India
- State: Telangana
- District: YDR BHUVANAGIRI

Area
  - Total: 25.35 km^{2} (9.79 sq mi)

Population (2011)
  - Total: 3,892
  - Density: 153.5/km^{2} (397.6/sq mi)

Languages
  - Official: Telugu
- Time zone: UTC+5:30 (IST)
- PIN: 508227
- Vehicle registration: TS
- Nearest city: Mothkur (7km) jangaon (33Km); Aler(36Km); Bhuvanagiri(District HQ)-(50km); Lok Sabha constituency bhongir vidhana sabha constituency aler
- Vidhan Sabha constituency: Aler
- Climate: hot (Köppen)
- Website: yadadri.telangana.gov.in

Gundala is a mandal headquarter in Yadadri Bhuvanagiri district of the Indian state of Telangana.
