= Yadadri Bhuvanagiri =

Coordinates: 17°30′36″N 78°53′24″E

Yadadri Bhuvanagiri district
- District of Telangana
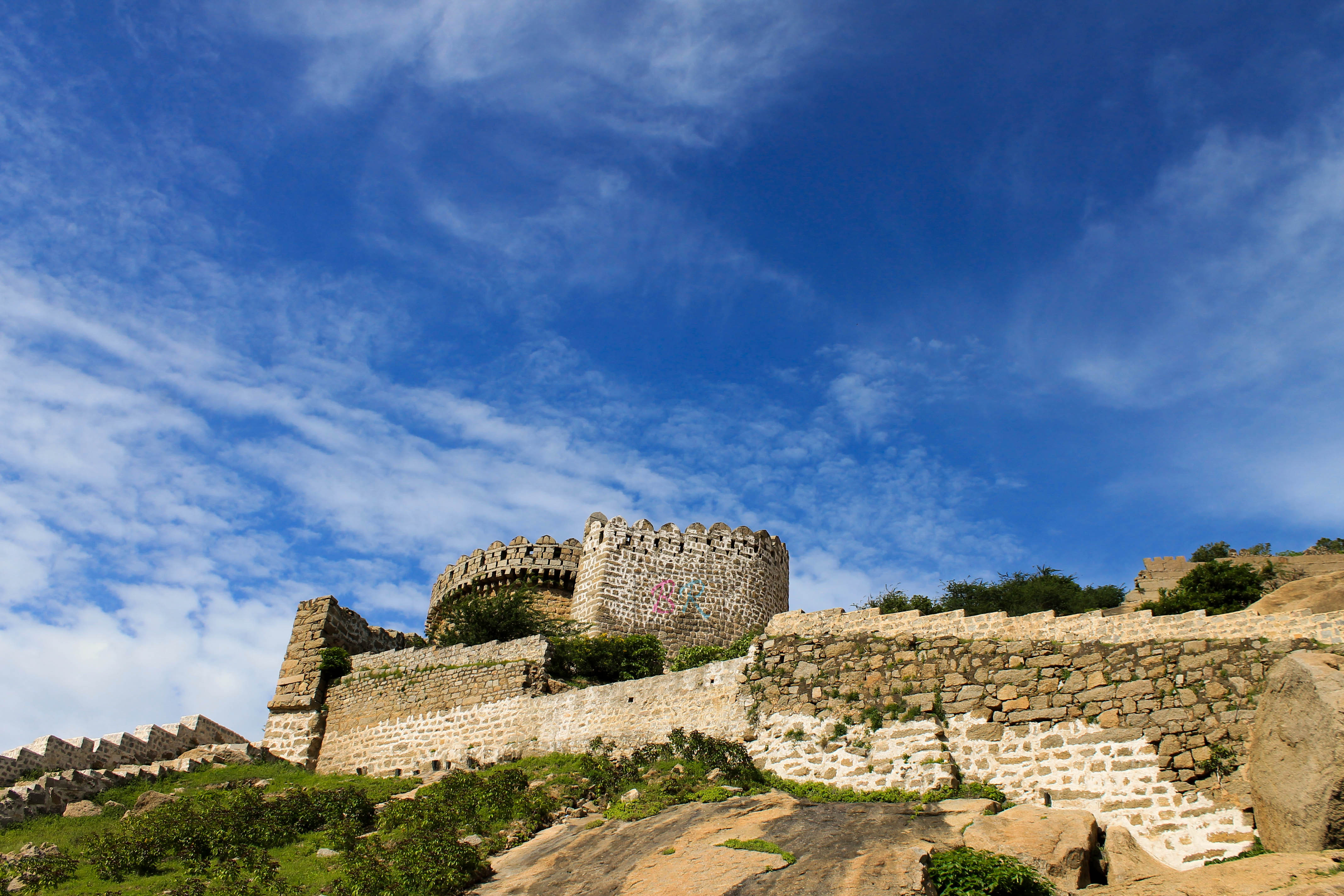
- View of Bhongir Fort

- Location in Telangana
- Yadadri Bhuvanagiri district
- Coordinates (Bhongiri): 17°30'36"N, 78°53'24"E
- Country: India
- State: Telangana
- Headquarters: Bhongir
- Mandalas: 16

Government
  - District collector: T, Vinay Krishna Reddy, IAS
  - Add.District Collector: Sri D Srinivas Reddy
  - Additional Collector Local Bodies: Sri Deepak Tiwari IAS
  - Deputy Commissioner Of Police: Sri Narayana Reddy
  - Administrative Officer: Sri M.Nageshwara Chary

Area
  - Total: 3,091.48 km^{2} (1,193.63 sq mi)

Population (2011)
  - Total: 770,833
  - Density: 249.341/km^{2} (645.790/sq mi)
- Time zone: UTC+05:30 (IST)
- Vehicle registration: TG–30
- Nominal GDP (2022-23): ₹24,611 crore (equivalent to ₹270 billion or US$2.8 billion in 2026)
- Per capita Income ( 2022-23 ): ₹267,605 (US$2,800)
- Website: yadadri.telangana.gov.in

Yadadri Bhuvanagiri district is a district in the Indian state of Telangana. The administrative headquarters is located at Bhuvanagiri which is also known as Bhongiri. The district shares boundaries with Suryapet, Nalgonda, Jangaon, Siddipet, Medchal-Malkajgiri and Rangareddy districts.

== Geography ==
The district is spread over an area of 3,091.48 square kilometres (1,193.63 sq mi).

== Demographics ==
Religion in Yadadri Bhuvanagiri district (2011)
Hinduism	94.81%
Islam	3.69%
Christianity	0.96%
Other or not stated	0.54%

As of 2011 Census of India, Yadadri Bhuvanagiri district has a population of 770,833. Yadadri Bhuvanagiri has a sex ratio of 974 females per 1000 males and a literacy rate of 65.67%. 79,962 (10.37%) were under 6 years of age. 123,165 (15.98%) lived in urban areas. Scheduled Castes and Scheduled Tribes made up 136,916 (17.76%) and 43,774 (5.68%) of the population respectively.

Languages of Yadadri Bhuvanagiri district (2011)
1. Telugu (90.5%)
2. Lambadi (5.00%)
3. Urdu (3.42%)
4. Others (1.04%)

At the time of the 2011 census, 90.54% of the population spoke Telugu, 5.00% Lambadi and 3.42% Urdu as their first language.

== Administrative divisions ==
The district has two revenue divisions of Bhongir and Choutuppal. It is sub-divided into 16 mandals.

=== Mandals ===
S.No.	Bhuvanagiri revenue division	Choutuppal revenue division
1	Bhongir	Choutuppal
2	Alair	Boodhan Pochampally
3	Atmakur (M)	Ramannapet
4	Addaguduru	Samsthan Narayanapur
5	Bibinagar	Valigonda
6	Bommalaramaram	
7	Gundala	
8	Motakondur	
9	Mothkur	
10	Rajapet	
11	Turkapally	
12	Yadagirigutta	

== See also ==
- List of districts in Telangana
