= MEMU =

Electric multiple unit trains in India

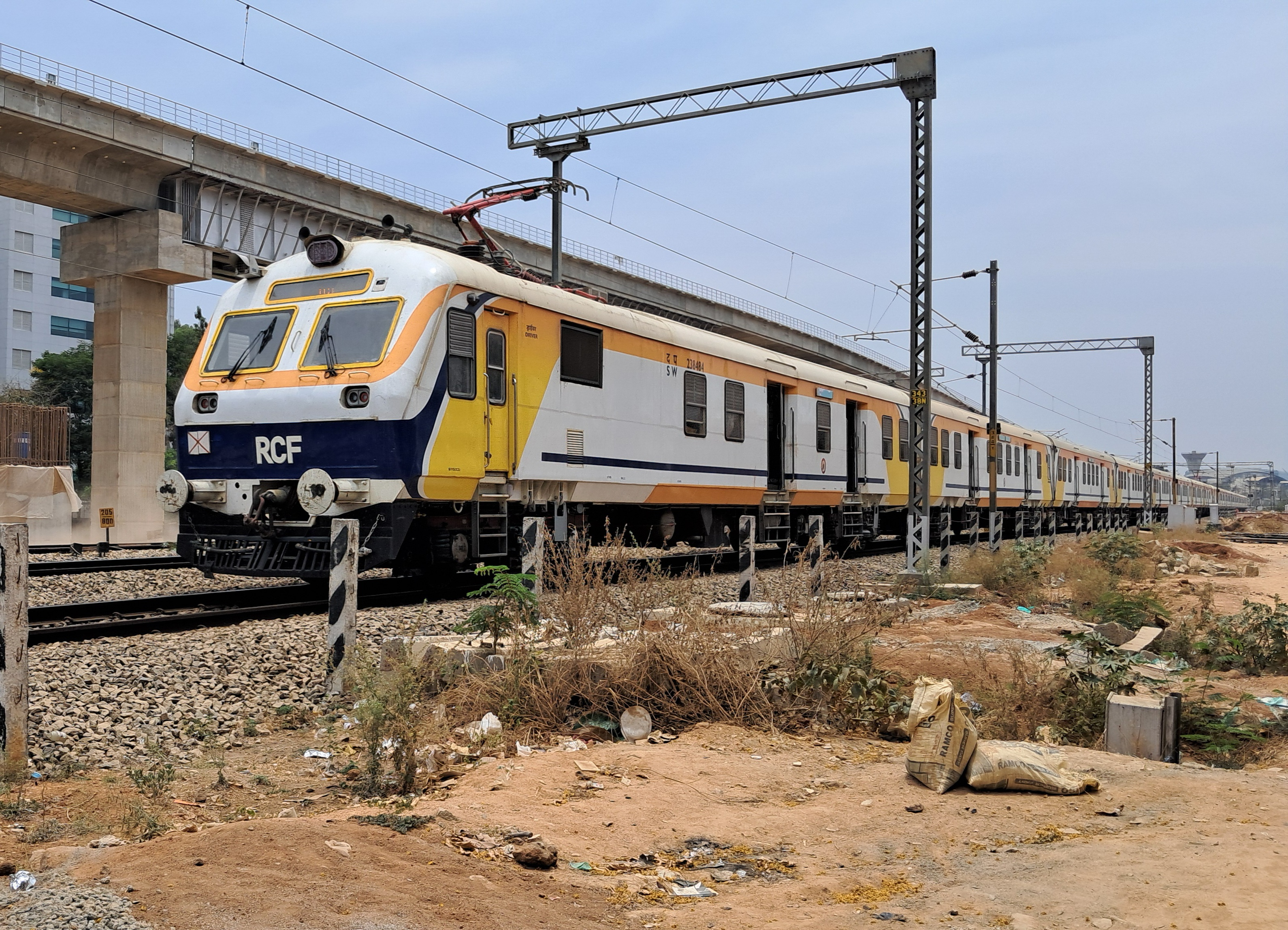
- A 3rd-generation MEMU train produced by Rail Coach Factory (RCF), Kapurthala.

Overview
- Owner: Indian Railways
- Area served: India
- Transit type: Regional rail/Commuter rail

Operation
- Began operation: 1995
- Operator: Indian Railways
- Reporting marks: IR
- Train length: 8/12/16 coaches

Technical
- Track gauge: 5 ft 6 in (1,676 mm) broad gauge
- Electrification: 25 kV AC Overhead line
- Average speed: 45 km/h (28 mph)
- Top speed: 110 km/h (68 mph)

Mainline Electric Multiple Units (MEMU) are electric multiple unit (EMU) trains operated by Indian Railway that serve short and medium-distance routes in India, compared to normal EMU trains that connect urban and suburban areas.

== History ==
Indian Railways (IR) started MEMU service on Asansol – Adra section on 15 July 1995 and on Kharagpur – Tata section on 22 July 1995. Delhi-Panipat MEMU service started on 27 September 1995. Raipur–Durg–Bhatapara–Raipur–Bilaspur MEMU service started on 17 October 1995. Arakkonam-Jolarpettai MEMU service on 22 May 2000. Bankura-Midnapore MEMU started on 30 June 2000. The first 20 coach MEMU ran between Surat to Virar in 2017. Since 2019, 3rd gen MEMUs have started replacing existing MEMU sets.

New 3rd generation trains were rolled out from RCF Kapurthala with following features:

1. Ethernet-based Train Control Management System which provides advanced control features
2. design speeds of up to 110 kmph
3. Energy efficient LED lights with half power emergency lights in each coach
4. A GPS-based public address and passenger information system in each coach to facilitate passengers with respect to railway stations enroute
5. 3-phase IGBT-based converter and inverters designed and developed by BHEL
6. a technologically advanced regenerative braking system.

IR is progressively replacing all locomotive-hauled slow and fast passenger and intercity trains with EMUs. The upgraded trains are being re-branded as MEMUs.

== Operation ==
The system uses multiple electrical units operating on 25 kV AC drawn from overhead lines. The trailer coaches have two toilets for passengers and one for the crew.

The train can run up to 200 km (120 mi) between Eastern Ghat and Western Ghat. The sets have a maximum permitted speed of 105 km/h (65 mph). The motorcoaches use asynchronous DC traction motors and have a maximum designed speed of 110 km/h. These have a stainless steel body. Two of them operate on South Central Railways.

ICF prodused new MEMUs capable to operate at 110–130 km/h. The construction cost was ₹ 26 crore per unit and can carry 2,618 passengers. The sets use phase traction motors which use 35% less energy. They offers GPS-based passenger information systems and announcement, have double leaf sliding doors, gangways, CCTV cameras and aluminium luggage racks. The driver's cabin has AC and the coaches have an emergency communication facility. They are designed to operate between cities 200–300 km (120–190 mi) away in Uttar Pradesh. The sets entered service in February 2019.

== Manufacturing ==
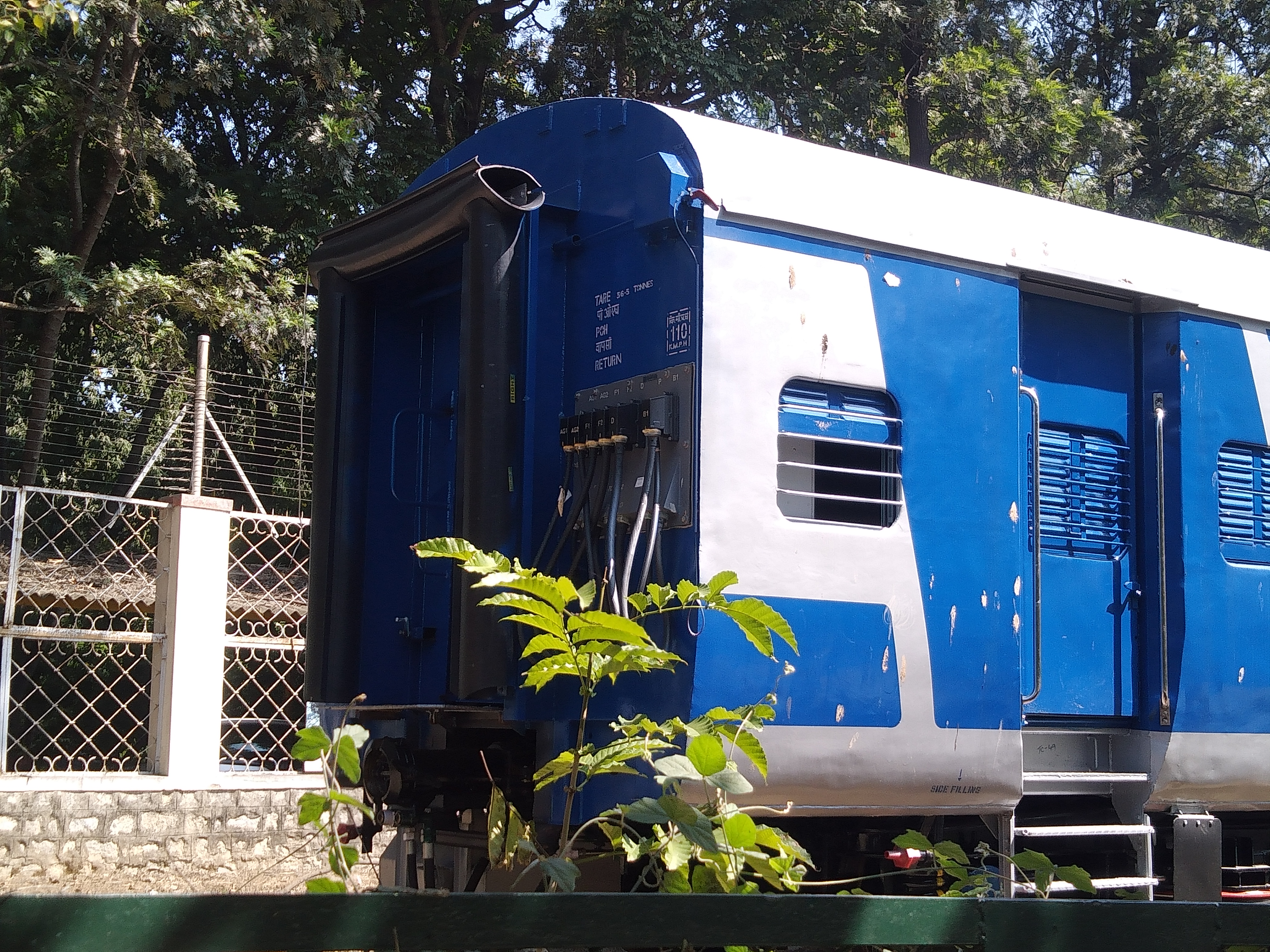
MEMU Rakes built by BEML, Bangalore

MEMUs are manufactured at Rail Coach Factory, Kapurthala, and Integral Coach Factory, Chennai. Sets are maintained in the Titlagarh coach maintenance shops. Marathwada Rail Coach Factory, Latur is currently trying to ramp up production capacity to 250 MEMU coaches per annum.

== Maintenance ==
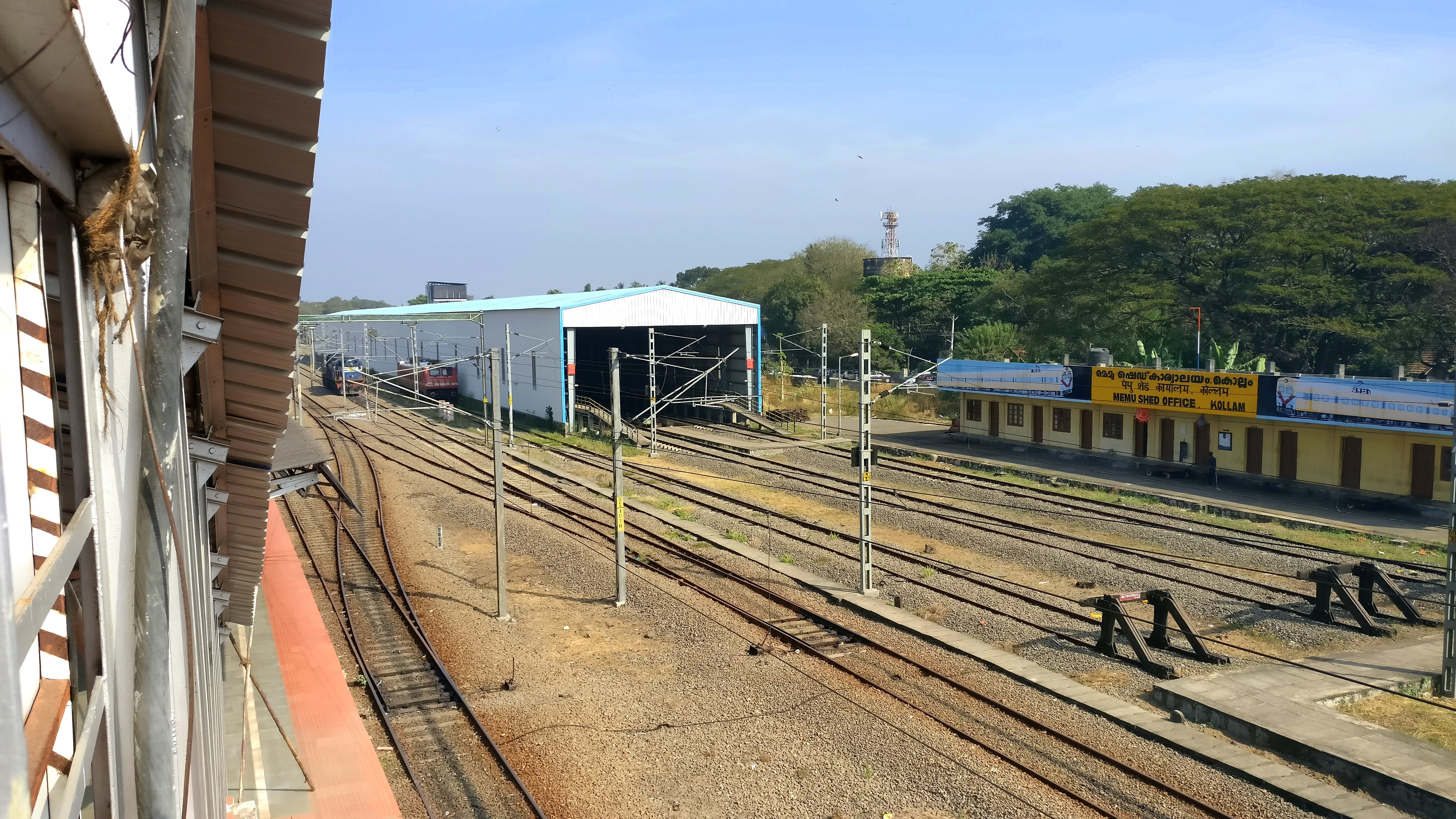
MEMU Car Shed and Office in Kollam Junction railway station premises

MEMU Car Sheds are use for the maintenance of MEMU sets in most of the states where services are operated. MEMU Car Sheds are operational in Avadi, Bangalore, Kollam, Palakkad, Tambaram, Trichy and Vijayawada under Southern Railway.

== Rolling stock ==
MEMU usually consist of 8, 12 and 16 car sets, but there are 14, 18 and 20 car configurations too. The trailer coaches have two toilets for passengers and one for the crew.

== Services ==
=== Diesel Electric Multiple Units (DEMU) ===
Service	Locale	Distance	Average speed	Travel time	Stops	Frequency	Ref
Ambala–Amb Andaura	Haryana and Himachal Pradesh	213 km (132 mi)	41 km/h (25 mph)	06h 10m	22	Twice a day	
Amritsar–Attari	Punjab	24 km (15 mi)	32 km/h (20 mph)	00h 45m	13	Daily	
Ara–Sasaram	Bihar	97 km (60 mi)	28 km/h (17 mph)	03h 30m	26	Daily	
Banihal–Baramula DEMU	Jammu and Kashmir	135 km (84 mi)	58 km/h (36 mph)	02h 35m	12	Daily	
Indore–Dr. Ambedkar Nagar	Madhya Pradesh	21 km (13 mi)	23 km/h (14 mph)	0h 55m	12	Daily	
Indore–Ratlam	Madhya Pradesh	115 km (71 mi)	44 km/h (27 mph)	02h 40m	13	Daily	
Jalandhar City–Amritsar	Punjab	79 km (49 mi)	39 km/h (24 mph)	01h 50m	13	Daily	
Mahesana–Abu Road DEMU	Gujarat and Rajasthan	117 km (73 mi)	37 km/h (23 mph)	00h 55m	15	Daily	
Nizamabad–Kacheguda	Telangana	166 km (103 mi)	40 km/h (25 mph)	04h 10m	12	Thrice a day	
Raichur–Gadwal–Kacheguda	Karnataka and Telangana	60 km (37 mi)	60 km/h (37 mph)	01h 00m	8	Daily	
Rajgir–Bakhtiyarpur	Bihar	54 km (34 mi)	22 km/h (14 mph)	02h 25m	5	Daily	
Ratlam–Laxmibai Nagar	Madhya Pradesh	115 km (71 mi)	45 km/h (28 mph)	02h 45m	14	Daily	
Rohtak–Rewari	Haryana	81 km (50 mi)	40 km/h (25 mph)	02h 00m	13	Daily	
Sabarmati–Mahesana	Gujarat	63 km (39 mi)	47 km/h (29 mph)	01h 20m	7	Daily	
Sabarmati–Patan	Gujarat	103 km (64 mi)	40 km/h (25 mph)	02h 35m	7	Daily	
Vasai Road–Diva	Maharashtra	40 km (25 mi)	46 km/h (29 mph)	00h 52m	5	Daily	

=== Electric Multiple Units (EMU) ===
Service	Locale	Distance	Average speed	Travel time	Stops	Frequency	Ref
Tirupati	Andhra Pradesh	147 km (91 mi)	37 km/h (23 mph)	04h 00m	25	Daily	
Dahod–Ratlam	Gujarat and Madhya Pradesh	114 km (71 mi)	47 km/h (29 mph)	03h 05m	12	Daily	
Falaknuma–Bhuvanagiri	Telangana	46 km (29 mi)	24 km/h (15 mph)	01h 50m	15	Daily	
Panvel–Dahanu Road MEMU	Maharashtra	136 km (85 mi)	41 km/h (25 mph)	03h 25m	19	Daily	
Panvel–Vasai Road	Maharashtra	63 km (39 mi)	46 km/h (29 mph)	01h 35m	10	Daily	
Rajgir–Danapur	Bihar	109 km (68 mi)	24 km/h (15 mph)	04h 35m	21	Daily	
Sealdah–Berhampore Court	West Bengal	186 km (116 mi)	44 km/h (27 mph)	04h 15m	23	Daily	
Ujjain–Nagda	Madhya Pradesh	56 km (35 mi)	39 km/h (24 mph)	01h 25m	6	Daily	
Virar–Bharuch	Gujarat and maharashtra	267 km (166 mi)	37 km/h (23 mph)	06h 45m	39	Daily	
Whitefield–KSR Bengaluru City	Karnataka	23 km (14 mi)	35 km/h (22 mph)	00h 40m	12	Daily	

== Gallery ==
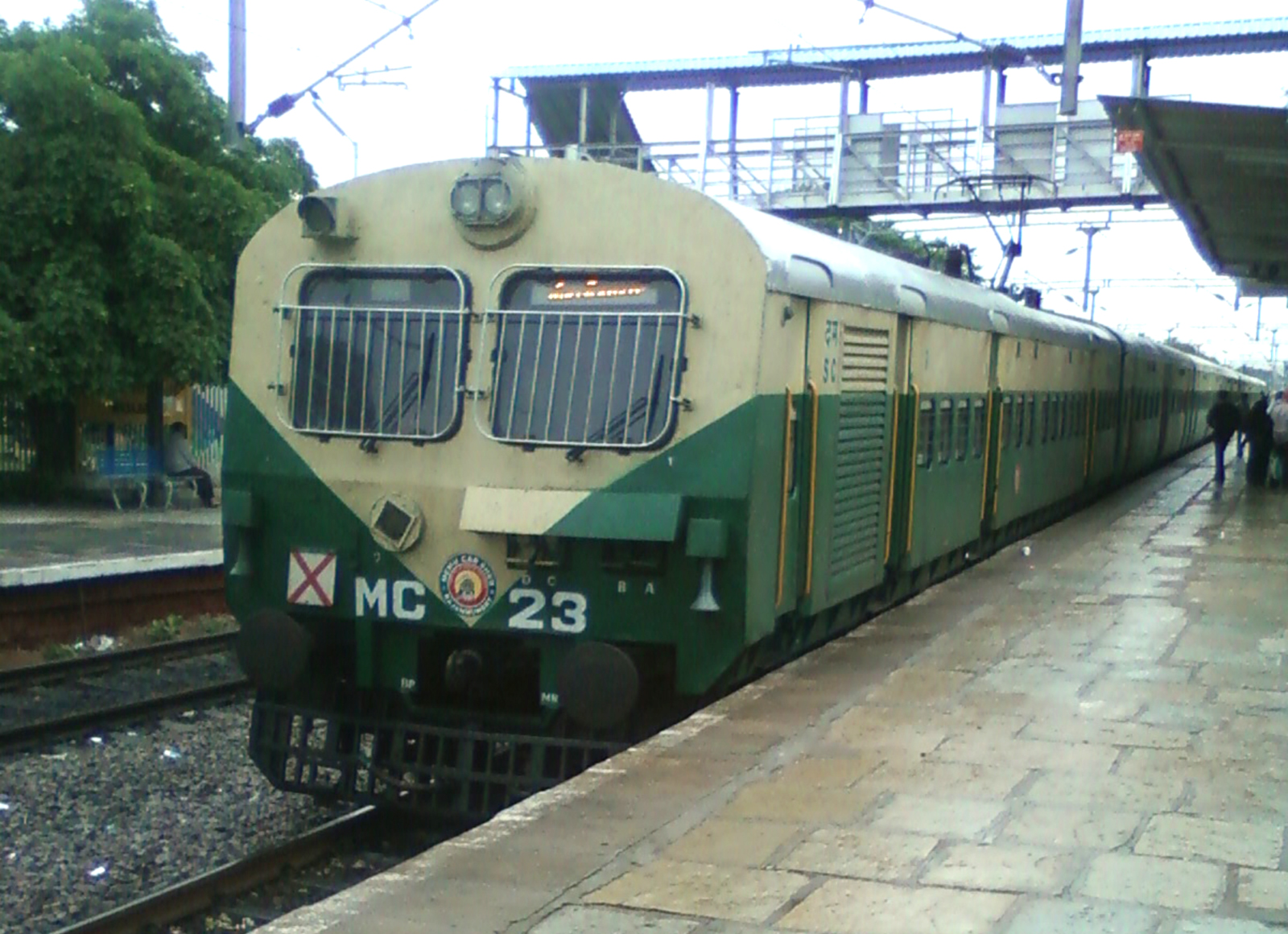
An older MEMU set with the initial blunt nose design.

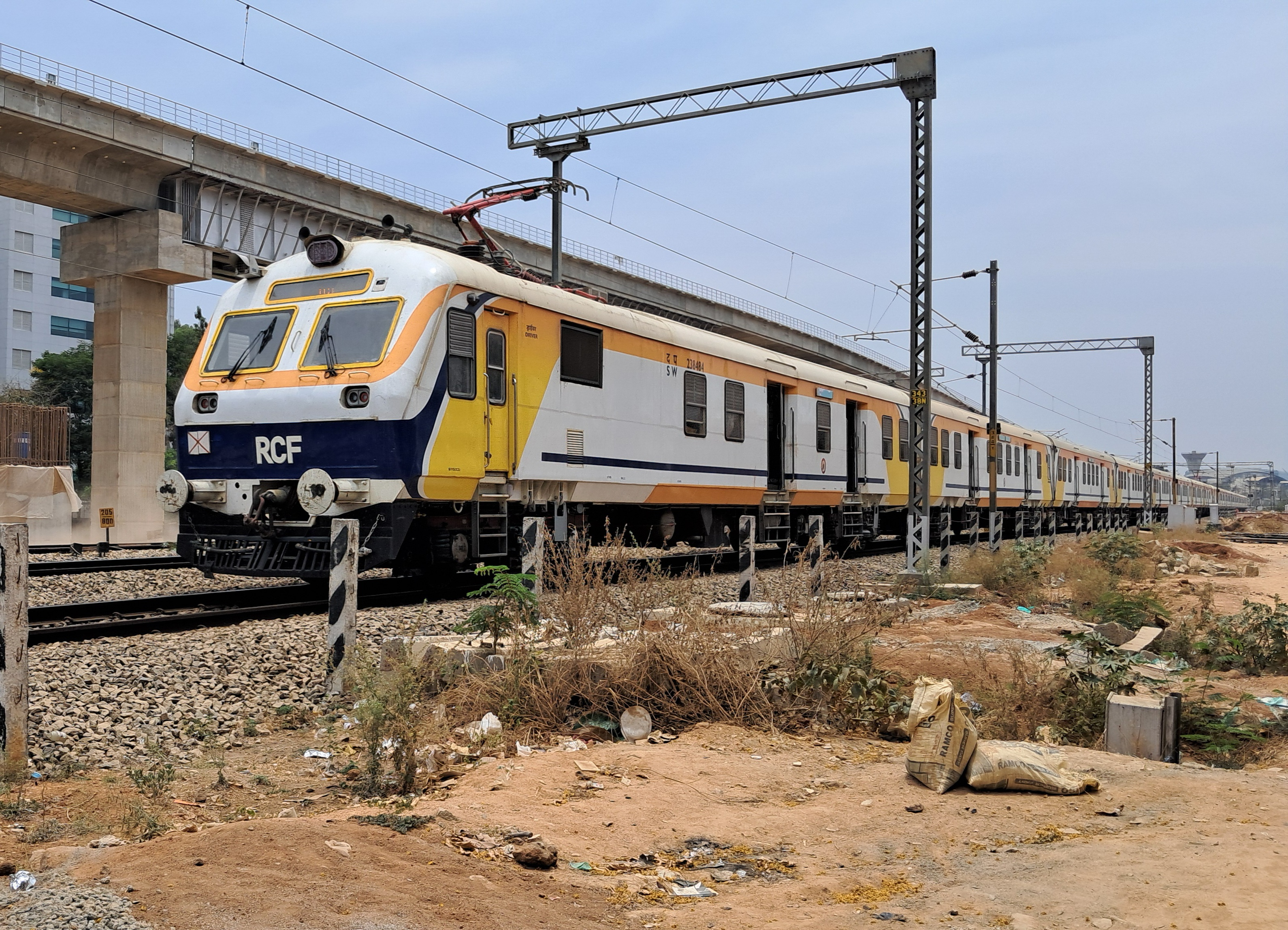
New Generation of MEMU trainsets manufactured by RCF Kapurthala

== See also ==
- SSEMU
- Comparison to locomotive hauled train
- Namo Bharat (trainset)
- Vande Bharat (trainset)
- Vande Bharat (sleeper trainset)
- High-speed rail in India
- Multiple units of India
- Express trains in India
- Slow and fast passenger trains in India
- Suburban trains
