= Amritsar train disaster =

Train accident in Amritsar, 2018

Amritsar train incident

Details
- Date: 19 October 2018 ≈18:45 IST (UTC+05:30)
- Location: Amritsar, Punjab
- Coordinates: 31°37′51″N 74°53′50″E
- Country: India
- Operator: Indian Railways: Northern Railway
- Cause: Trespassing

Statistics
- Trains: 2 (a Punjab Mail and DMU train)
- Deaths: At least 62
- Injured: At least 200

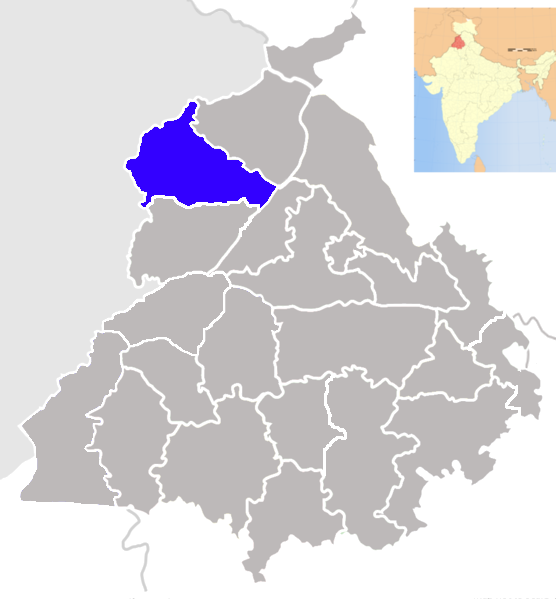

On 19 October 2018, two Indian Railways passenger trains hit a crowd of people in the eastern outskirts of Amritsar, Punjab, killing at least 62 people and injuring approximately 200 more. The crowd had gathered to watch celebrations for the Hindu festival of Dussehra and were standing on the tracks.

== Incident ==
External videos
- Footage of Amritsar Train Accident / The Quint, ANI

Spectators were watching the burning of an effigy of Ravana as part of the Dussehra festival and had gathered on and around train tracks in the Joda Phatak (Note: The name is that of a railway crossing. Other spellings used in the English-language media include "Jaura" and "Jodha".) area on the outskirts of Amritsar when a commuter train ploughed into the crowd.

The train was described as a diesel multiple unit (DMU) local passenger train travelling westbound from Jalandhar station to Amritsar. The Amritsar–Howrah Mail service, had passed in the opposite direction moments earlier, and this was later confirmed by the gateman in charge of the junction.

Several witnesses claimed that the train operator did not use the horn to warn spectators as the train approached the crowd. The driver said that he both honked and applied the emergency brakes but did not come to a complete halt because the crowd had begun to pelt the train with stones.

Local Congress politician Navjot Kaur Sidhu, the wife of the Member of the Legislative Assembly for Amritsar East, was the guest of honour at the event. She said she had left the site shortly before the accident occurred but that she returned as soon as she heard about it. Sidhu also said that the celebration was held there every year and that the railway authorities were alerted in advance of the need to moderate their speed.

== Victims ==
At least 62 people were killed. By the evening of 19 October, 50 bodies had been discovered and at least 50 others had been admitted to a nearby hospital while an additional nine bodies were found the next day. Due to the force of the train's impact, many victims were dismembered or mutilated beyond recognition, which delayed body identification.

A local official said that most of the victims were migrant workers and their families from the states of Uttar Pradesh and Bihar who lived in the area. Navjot Singh Sidhu visited some of the survivors and family members of the dead at a local hospital, on 20 October. During his visit two women met with him who had reportedly lost their entire families, including children, husbands and even in-laws.

The majority of those identified were cremated at the Shitla Mata Temple in Amritsar, while a few others were sent back to their hometowns. Allegations were reported to the local media, that after the crash some of the crowd stole valuables of the victims and survivors; family members also reported that only the bodies of their relatives were returned but not their effects.

== Response ==
Punjab Chief Minister Amarinder Singh announced compensation of ₹5 lakh (equivalent to ₹6.7 lakh or US$6,900 in 2023) for the family of each of those killed, and free treatment for the injured. There was no immediate decision about any compensation from the railways. The central government also announced a compensation of ₹2 lakh (equivalent to ₹2.7 lakh or US$2,800 in 2023) for the family of each of the dead and ₹50,000 (equivalent to ₹67,000 or US$690 in 2023) for the injured. The state announced a day of mourning in honour of the victims, and Singh ordered an inquiry into how the crash had occurred.

On 23 October, Navjot Singh Sidhu, Minister for Local Government, Tourism and Cultural Affairs in the Punjab State Government and husband of Navjot Kaur Sidhu, who was the guest of honour at the festival, announced that he and his wife would adopt all the children who lost parents in the accident, covering their education and all other expenses, and that women who lost their husbands would also be extended all required financial help.

Prime Minister Narendra Modi and President Ramnath Kovind offered condolences to the families of the dead and hopes that the injured would recover quickly. Video footage of the incident seemed to show several mobile phones filming after the crash, causing the former Jammu and Kashmir Chief Minister Omar Abdullah to criticise the reaction of the crowd.

Pakistani Prime Minister Imran Khan, Canadian Prime Minister Justin Trudeau, and Russian President Vladimir Putin sent their condolences to the families of the victims.

=== Protest ===
The day after the crash, 20 October, some locals staged a sit-in protest on the railway tracks, demanding action from officials, the train driver, and "adequate compensation" for the victims. Some protesters demanded that the families of those killed receive government jobs and placed blame on officials. Railway services resumed 40 hours after the incident.

== Railway ==
Railways Minister Piyush Goyal, on a visit to the United States at the time of the crash, announced his immediate return to India. The route between Jalandhar and Amritsar was suspended, and the day after the incident 37 trains were cancelled, 16 trains diverted, and 18 trains terminated early.

Minister of State for Railways Manoj Sinha said that the railways administration had not been informed of the festival's location or timing. A senior Indian Railways official described the incident as "a clear case of trespassing" and, when asked why the train did not stop or slow as it approached, explained that there was "so much smoke that the driver was unable to see anything and he was also negotiating a curve."

=== Driver ===
The driver reported the incident immediately to the Amritsar Junction station master and was detained by the Punjab Police and Railway Police at Ludhiana Railway Station for questioning. The driver reportedly told officials that he had received a green signal and had no idea that there were hundreds of people standing on the tracks. Railways Minister of State Manoj Sinha denied any negligence on the driver's part and stated that no action was being taken against him.

The driver released a letter on 21 October which detailed his account of the crash. He said that he applied the emergency brakes and honked to disperse the crowd, but when a mob surrounded the train and threw stones at the train he continued to the next stop.

== See also ==
- List of Indian rail accidents
- Lists of rail accidents
