= Wall Tax Road, Chennai =

Street in Chennai, India

V. O. C. Salai
- Wall Tax Road
- Native name: வ. உ. சி. சாலை (Tamil)
- Maintained by: Corporation of Chennai
- South end: Poonamallee High Road—Chennai Central junction at Park Town, Chennai

Wall Tax Road, also known officially as V. O. C. Salai, is a road in Chennai, India, adjacent to the Chennai Central railway station. The road runs parallel to the railway tracks of the station and borders George Town on the west. The eastern entrance of the terminus lies on the road. The road is named after the wall built as a protective measure by the British in 1772–1773, which still remains partially.

== History ==
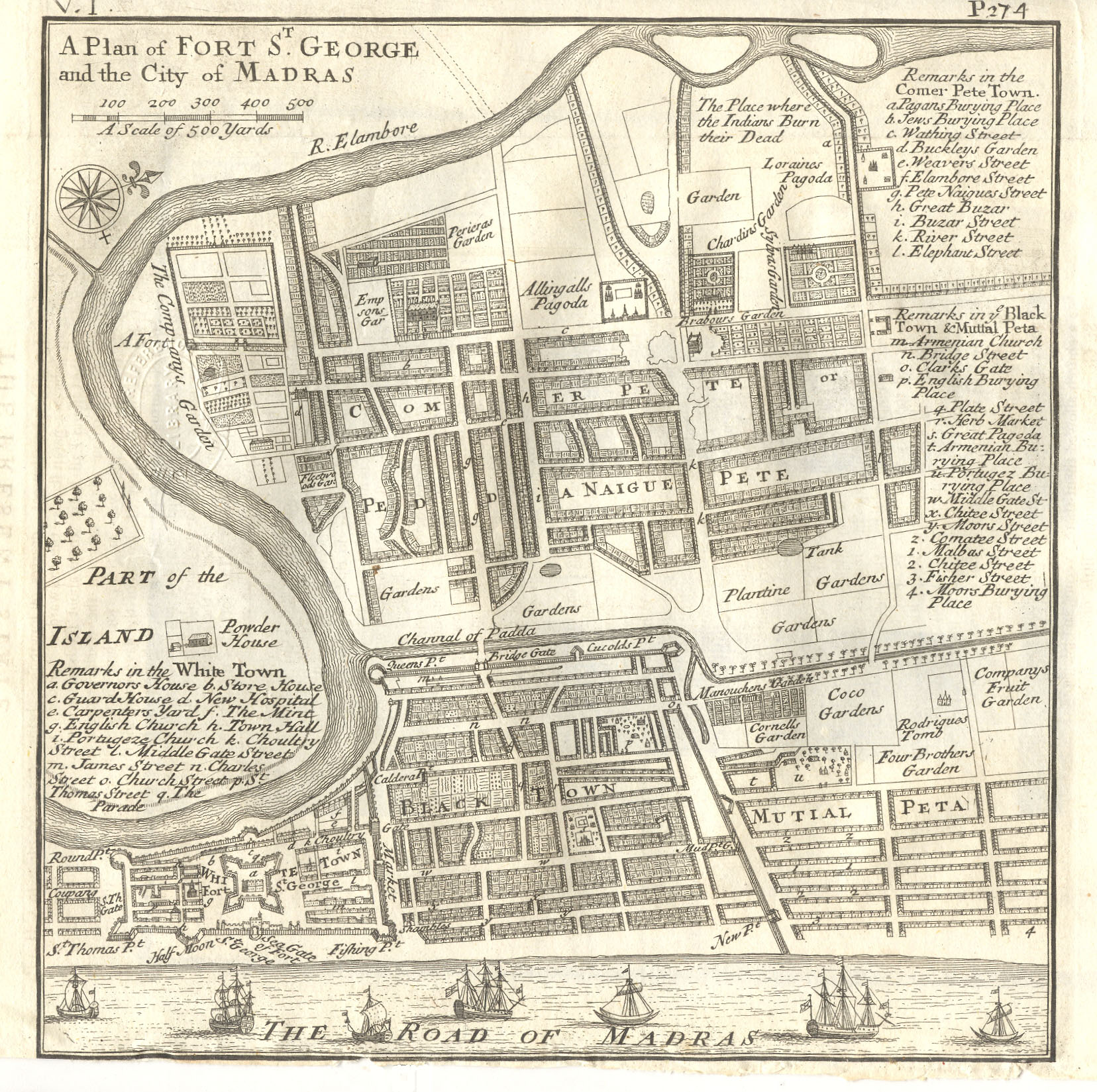
Plan of Fort St George and the city of Madras in 1726.

After being under the French control for a brief period from 1746 to 1748, the city of Madras was returned to the British following the Treaty of Aix-la-Chapelle. Soon after the treaty, the British began planning to strengthen Fort St. George and its protective Esplanade. The attacks by Hyder Ali in 1767 catalysed the process, which resulted in the building of a protective wall around the new Black Town, including the neighbourhoods such as Muthialpettah and Peddunaickenpettah (parts of the present-day George Town), located at the northern and western sides of the Fort. The Black Town Wall, as it was known then, was conceived by the company's chief engineer John Call and completed in 1772 by Paul Benfield, a contractor with the British government bidding about ₹ 500,000. With the Fort to the south and the sea to the east, the wall with 17 bastions ran for about 3.5 miles. Some of the remnants of the bastions, in which debtors and prisoners were believed to have been confined, are still found along Old Jail Road. The wall also had several gates, including Pully, Boatmen's, Trivatore, Ennore, Elephant, Chuckler's and Hospital gates. However, only one of them, the Elephant Gate, which was then used to load and unload goods transported in trams, remains today. During the 1782 war with Hyder Ali, with the exception of Monegar Choultry, all buildings near the wall were destroyed by the government.

The wall originally ran from Cochrane Canal on the northern side, now known as the Buckingham Canal, to the junction of Poonamalle High Road and Madras Central railway station on the southern side. The outer side of the wall had provisions measuring about 600 yards for setting up a clear field for fire in the event of a future attack, which was later developed into People's Park and a railway goods shed named Salt Cotaurs in 1859. A mini-fort with gun emplacements was built at the sea-end side of the wall, and the fort was named Clive Battery, after Edward Clive, governor of Madras from 1799 to 1803, which was later demolished to build a flyover connecting Royapuram and Rajaji Salai. A 50-feet road was built on the inner side of the wall to facilitate connectivity. When the road was completed, the government decided to impose the cost of the newly laid road on the public in the form of tax, but the people refused to pay it. Thus, the tax was never collected. This eventually lead to the road acquiring its name.

== The present-day road ==
Over the years, the area has been dominated by business community such as Chettiars, Naickers and North Indian community. The road remained the entertainment hub of pre-Independence era. There were three theatres on the road, namely, Otrai Vadai, Empress and Padmanabha. None of these is existent, with the closure of the last one, the Padmanabha theatre, in 2007.

Today, the road remains partly commercial and partly residential. Commercial activities in and around the road include parcel services, hotels and lodges. There are several streets branching from the road and all enjoy similar business activities. Mint Street, which housed mint in the early 19th century, houses the government printing press. The road is also known for its prominence in bamboo products such as baskets, mats and other artefacts, a commercial activity established on the road since Independence. The Andhra Pradesh bus stand, which had been used by buses to Andhra Pradesh before the opening of Chennai Mofussil Bus Terminus, is located opposite to Padmanabha Theatre and has now been converted into a government park. A sardine market, operating since the 1960s, is located at the Old Jail Road junction at the end of the road. However, it has been reduced in size over the years, especially after the closure of the Andhra Pradesh bus terminus.

Walltax Road (now, V.O.C. Salai), which is adjacent to the Central Railway Station, runs parallel to railway tracks and flanks Georgetown on the west. The history of the road dates back to 18th Century. The wall, which one sees partially now, was instituted as a protective measure by the English in 1772–73. The French occupied the City from 1746 to 1749. When British got back the City, it began plans to strengthen the Fort. When Hyder Ali attacked the neighborhoods in 1767, the British made serious plans to protect the New Black Town (Muthialpettah and Peddunaickenpettah) and thus plans for a protective wall was laid out. The wall, called ‘Black Town Wall,' ran for three-and-half-miles and had 17 bastions. It was completed by Paul Benfield in 1772.

The wall ran from Cochrane Canal on north to Poonamalle High Road- Central Station junction on the south. On the outer side of the walls, a vast space of six hundred yards was provided to set up a clear field for fire. In 1859, it was converted into People's Park and Salt Cotaurs. The walls had gates, some of which were Pully Gate, Boatmen's Gate, Trivatore Gate, Ennore Gate, Elephant Gate, Chuckler's Gate and Hospital Gate. Elephant Gate, which remains till today, was then used for loading and unloading of goods carried in trams.

On the other side of the wall, a 50-feet road was built to facilitate connectivity. The cost of which was imposed on the people. People protested to the tax and it was never collected. The Road probably acquired the name from these instances. It is said that the debtor and prisoners were confined in the bastions, some of the remnants of which was still found on the Old Jail Road.

This historically significant Road is now besieged by commercial activities housing parcel services, lodges, hotels and the branching streets bristling with business. Yet, it has some of the remains intact and significant streets serving new purposes.

The Mint Street, one of the most happening places in Georgetown, housed Mint in early years of 19th Century. The unit which was used to produce gunpowder was transformed into a Mint for which the work began in 1804. The building was completed in 1807, but the mint machineries were made available only in 1841. Now, the building is converted into Government printing press and is being used for the print requirements of the Government.

After the Sepoy Mutiny, The British offered thanksgiving to God by building Memorial Hall in South Mint Street in 1860.

Georgetown has the pride of having seen the first of the earlier temples of the City.

Kandaswamy Temple was built in 1670 by Beri Chettiars on Rasappa Chetty Street. (There is also a record saying that the temple belonged to the 11th Century). The temple is dedicated to Lord Siva and bears some rich inscriptions of the era. The shrines contained in the temple are those of Kadaswamy, Siva, Vishnu and Brahma. It is said that social reformer Ramalinga Adigalar sang ‘Deivamanimalai' in this temple. In 1930, a grand Kumbabhishekam was held after which it became an annual affair drawing lot of crowd.

One cannot but miss the sight of bamboo vendors on Walltax Road who make bamboo mats, baskets and other artefacts on the platform. They have been doing business in Georgetown for more than 60 years. The fourth generation vendors were shifted from Flower Bazaar 40 years ago to Walltax Road. Recently, they have been asked to vacate from Walltax Road by the Chennai Corporation as a measure to remove encroachment.

The Andhra Pradesh Bus Stand located diagonally opposite to Padmanabha Theatre is now turned into Walltax Road Depot. Buses used to ply Andhra Pradesh until the coming of CMBT.

The Sardine Market, more than 50- years-old, located at the end of Walltax Road and the Old Jail Road junction, has been reduced in size over the years. After the closure of Andhra Pradesh Bus Stand, the market is seeing a slow business and the vendors have shifted to Koyembedu.

The branching streets are doing brisk business in various products. It is said that in earlier days, Chettiars used to sell gold kept in heaps on the road on Mint Street. Now the street sells almost all products. Elephant Gate Street specialises in dress materials, Nainiappan Naicken Street in jewellery, Kasi Chetty Street and Narayana Mudali Street in electronics goods, toys and other foreign goods and Rasappa Chetty in hardware.

== See also ==
- History of Chennai
- George Town
