= Chennai Central railway station =

Railway terminus in Tamil Nadu, India

Chennai Central Puratchi Thalaivar Dr. M.G. Ramachandran Central Railway Station
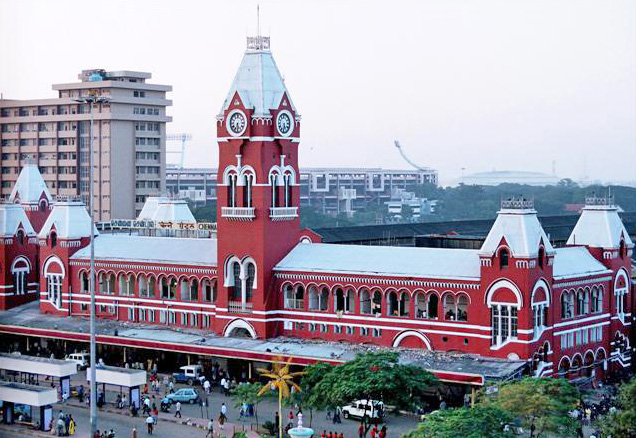
- Front facade of Chennai Central

General information
- Other names: Chennai Central; Madras Central; M.G.R. Chennai Central
- Location: Poonamallee High Road, Periamet, Chennai; India
- Coordinates: 13°04′57″N 80°16′30″E
- Elevation: 3.465 m (11.37 ft)
- System: Indian Railways; Chennai Suburban Railway
- Owner: Ministry of Railways, Government of India
- Operator: Indian Railways
- Lines: Chennai–Bengaluru; Chennai–Howrah; Chennai–Mumbai; Chennai–New Delhi
- Platforms: 17 (12 main station + 5 Chennai Suburban Terminal)
- Connections: MTC; Chennai Suburban (Park); Chennai MRTS (Park Town); Blue Line Green Line (Central)

Construction
- Parking: Available
- Accessible: Disabled access
- Architect: George Harding; Robert Chisholm
- Architectural style: Gothic Revival; Romanesque

Other information
- Status: Operational
- Station code: MAS
- Zone(s): Southern Railway zone
- Division(s): Chennai

History
- Opened: 1873; 153 years ago
- Electrified: 1931; 95 years ago

Passengers
- 730,000 per day (2023)

Services
- 200 Mail/Express
- 1000 Suburban/MU
per day (2023)
Location
- Location within Chennai
- Interactive map

Chennai Central (officially Puratchi Thalaivar Dr. M.G. Ramachandran Central Railway Station, formerly Madras Central; station code: MAS) is a railway station in Chennai, India. It is one of the busiest railway stations in South India and a major rail hub in the country. It is classified as a NSG–1 category station and comes under the purview of the Chennai railway division of the Southern Railway zone of the Indian Railways. It is situated in the neighbourhood of Periamet, with the main entrance situated on the Poonamallee High road. It caters to various inter-city express trains, with multiple units, and suburban services operating from the adjacent suburban terminal.

The Madras Central station was built in 1873 and became the terminus of the Madras Railway in the city. The building was designed by architect George Harding and was further modified as per the design of Robert Chisholm in 1900. Designed in a mixed Gothic Revival and Romanesque architecture, it is one of the prominent landmarks in Chennai. The station has undergone a series of renovations. It became part of the Madras and Southern Mahratta Railway in 1908, and later as a part of the Southern Railway zone of the Indian Railways in 1951. The station underwent modifications and expansions in 1959.

The railway lines at the station was electrified in 1979. The Moore Market Complex, adjacent to the main terminal, was opened in 1986 to accommodate suburban services, and ticket offices. The station underwent further expansion in 1998, with the addition of a new building to the west. It was renamed to Chennai Central in 1998 to reflect the name change of the city from Madras to Chennai in 1996. It was rechristened in honour of former chief minister M. G. Ramachandran on 5 April 2019. After the renaming, it has the second-longest name of a railway station, after the station at Llanfair in Wales.

As of 2024, it is the third highest revenue earning station of the Indian Railways. As per a 2007 report published by the Indian Railways, it was rated as one of the cleanest stations in South India.

== History ==
=== Construction and early development ===
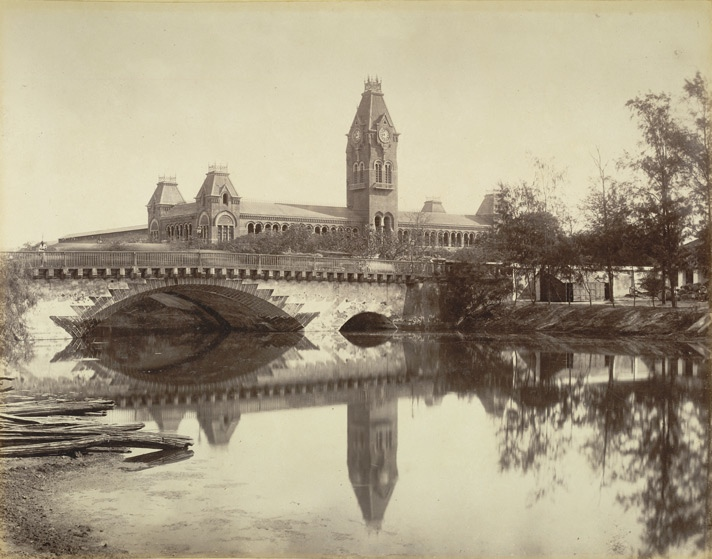
Central station as seen from the Buckingham Canal c. 1880

The first railway line in India became operational in Madras in 1837. The Madras Railway was established in 1845, and the first main line in South India between Royapuram and Arcot became operational on 1 July 1856. The extension of the line to Vyasarpadi, required a second station in Madras.

In 1873, Madras Central was established as a second terminus to decongest the Royapuram station, which was later used for port movements. The station with four platforms, was built at Park Town around the slopes of Periamet. It came up on an open area, which was once owned by Joao Pereira, a Portuguese merchant, who settled in Madras in the 17th century CE, and later fell into disuse. The station underwent further modifications, which were completed in 1900.

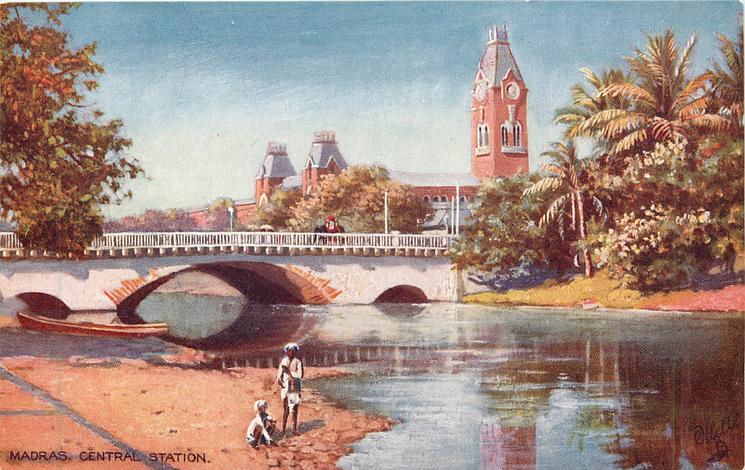
Central station – Tucks Oilette (1911)

In 1907, the Madras Central station became the main terminus of the Madras Railway, after the line from beach was extended further south, and trains were then terminated at the station rather than Royapuram. The Madras and Southern Mahratta Railway was formed in 1908 and took over the administration of the station from the Madras Railway. The headquarters of the railway company was built adjacent to the station in 1922. With the opening of the Chennai Egmore railway station in 1908, plans were made to link Madras Central and Egmore. In 1931, electric traction was introduced on the suburban route Madras beach and Tambaram.

=== Expansion and further development ===
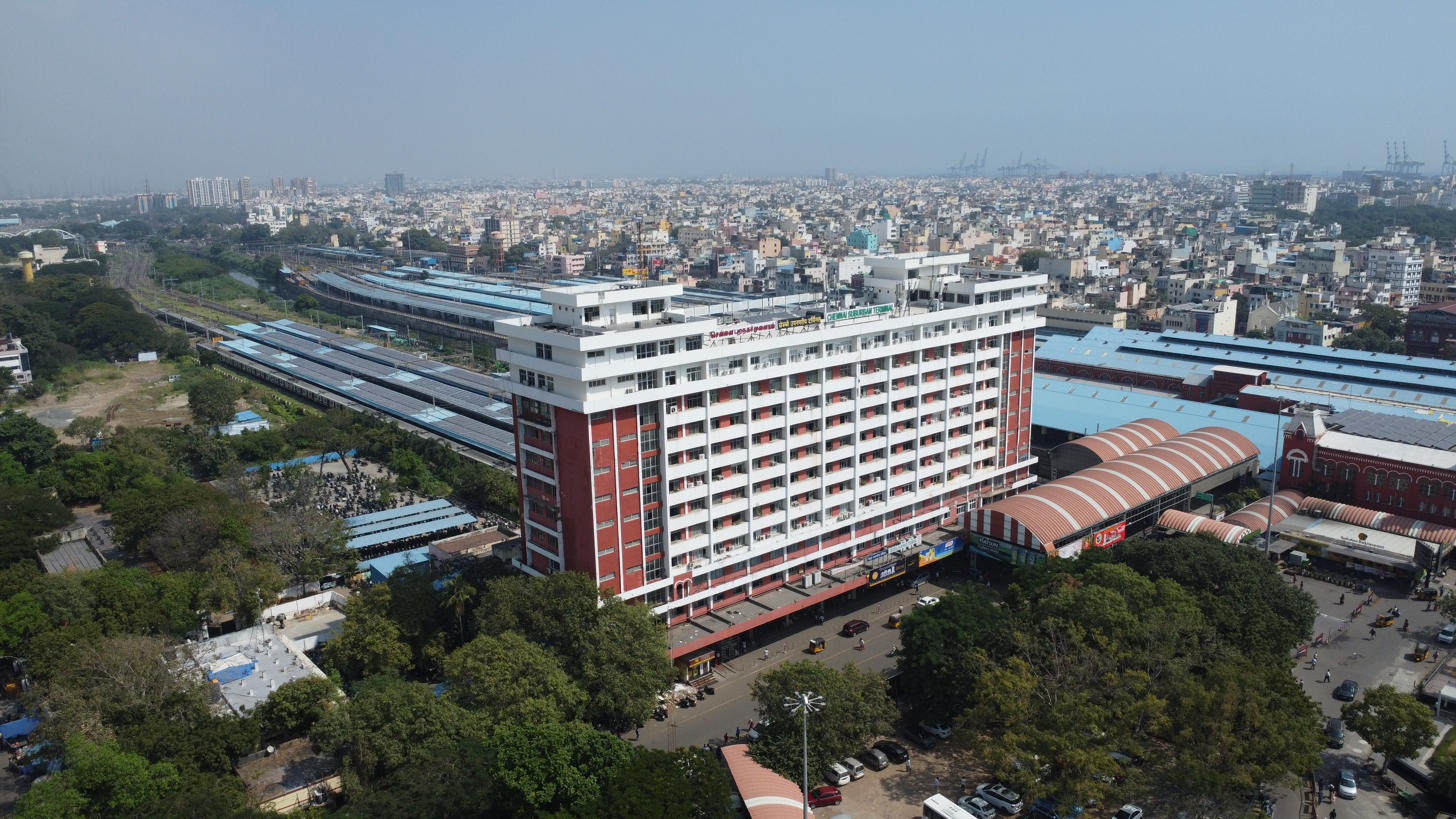
The suburban terminal at Moore Market Complex (left), added in 1986, with platforms of the main terminal (right)

In 1951, the station became part of the Southern Railway zone of the Indian Railways. In 1959, the station was expanded and additional changes were made to the layout. The electrification of the main lines at the station began in 1979, with the tracks along the seven platforms electrified on 29 December 1979. In the 1980s, the Southern Railway started looking for land for the expansion of the station. When the adjacent Moore Market building was destroyed in a fire in 1985, the state government transferred the land to the Railways. The 13-storied Moore Market Complex opened in 1986 and houses the suburban terminus, railway reservation counters, and other offices. Following the renaming of the city of Madras in 1996, the station became known as Chennai Central.

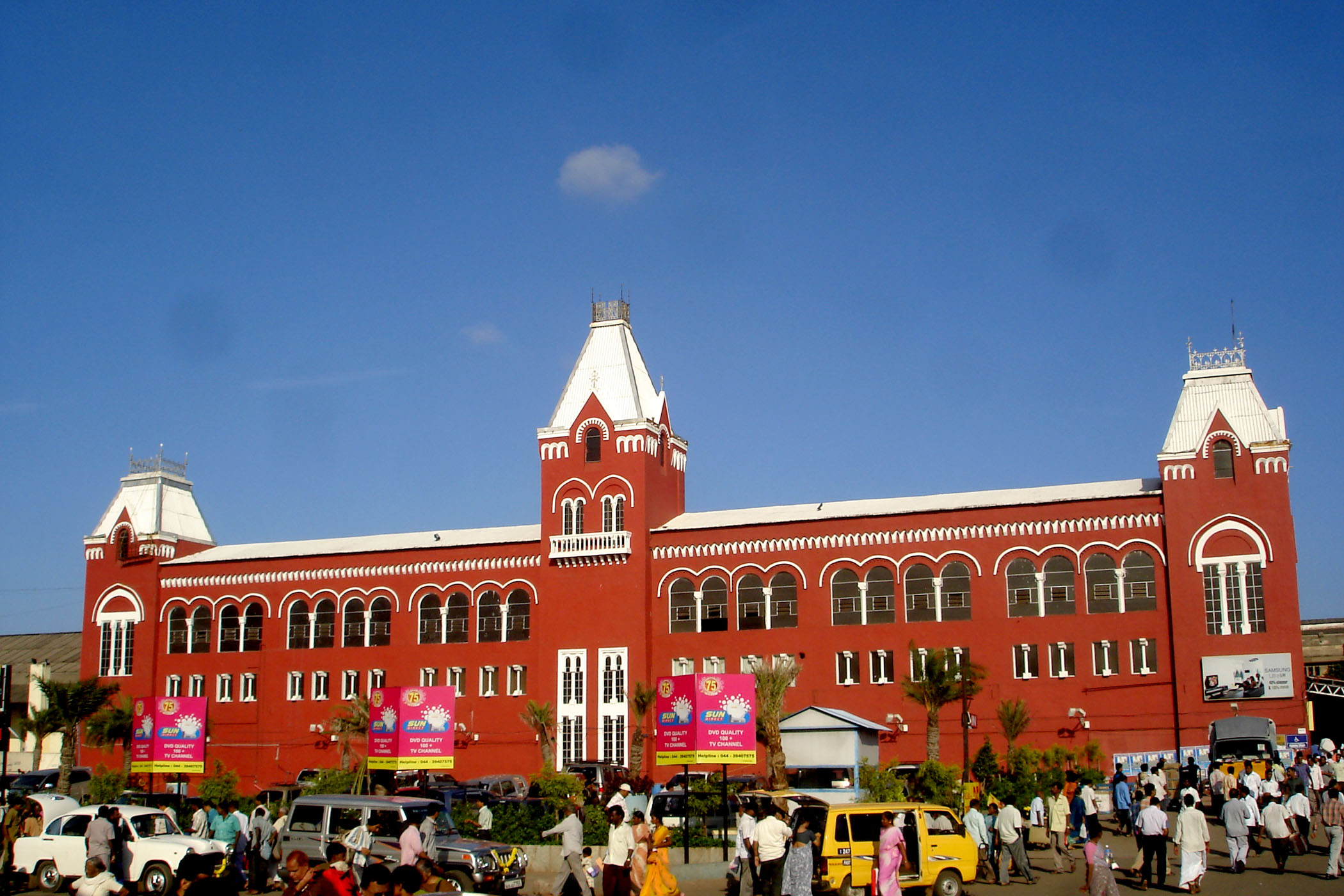
Side view of the west extension building added in 1998

To cater to increasing passenger movement, the main building was extended in 1998 with the addition of a new building on the western side with a similar architecture to the original, and the number of platforms increased to 12. In the late 1990s, IRCTC installed modular stalls and food plazas along the platforms. In 2005, the buildings were re-painted in light brown, and were quickly repainted in the original brick-red colour after a public campaign.

In the 2000s, there were multiple plans for further expansion and development of the station, including plans for a second terminal near the Moore Market Complex, and multi-level platforms to accommodate intercity and suburban services at various levels. However, the projects did not materialise. In 2013, ballast-less tracks were expanded to all. In the mid-2010s, the Indian Railways announced plans for redevelopment of the station with private partnership. In 2017, the Central Square was developed in the area around the station. In February 2019, a 100 ft (30 m) flag mast was installed at the front of the main building of the station at a cost of ₹1.5 million (US$16,000). On 6 March 2019, the prime minister Narendra Modi announced that the station will be renamed after M. G. Ramachandran, the former chief minister of Tamil Nadu. On 5 April 2019, the station was officially renamed as "Puratchi Thalaivar Dr. M.G. Ramachandran Central Railway Station".

== Layout and architecture ==
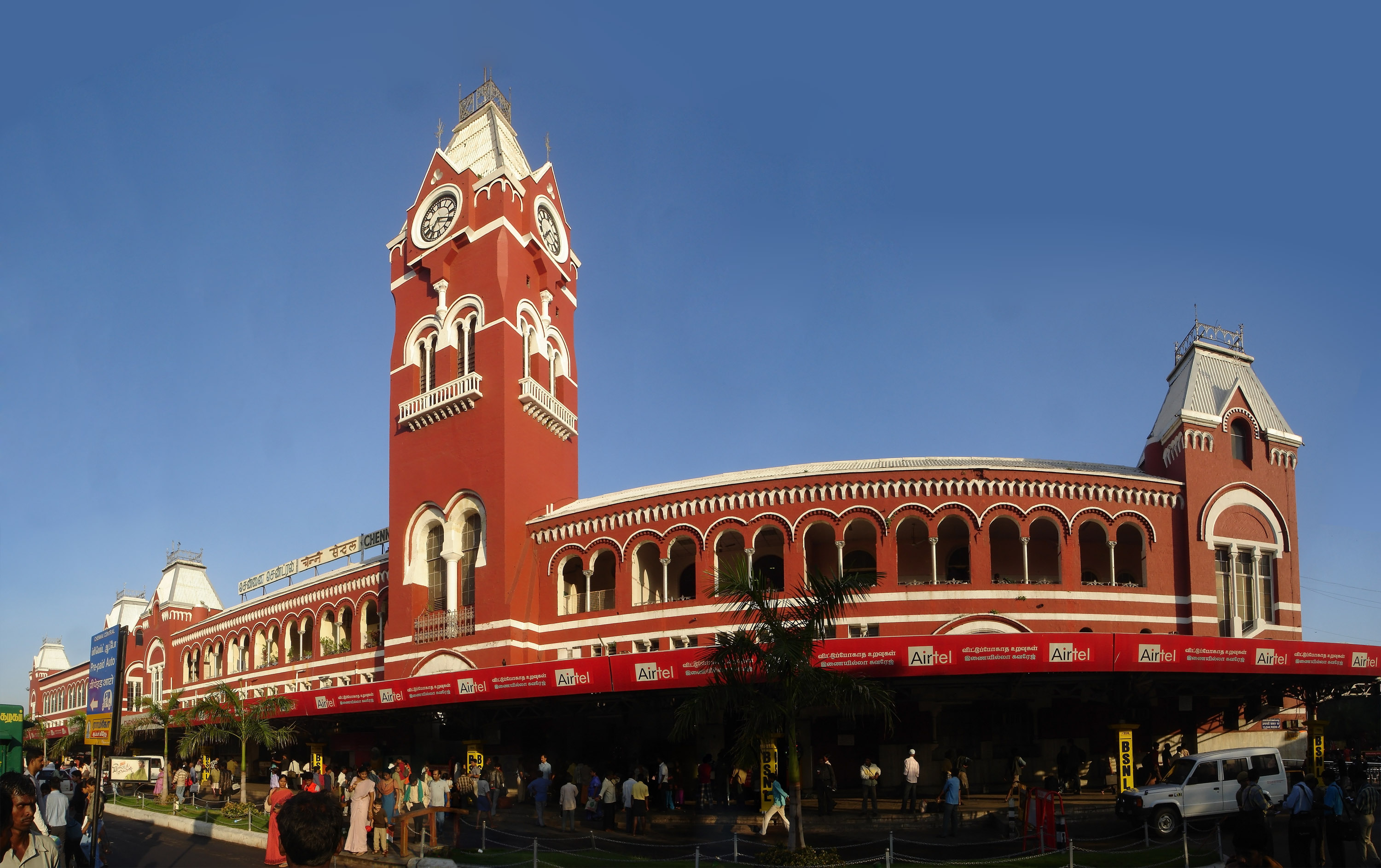
Panoramic view in 2008

Chennai Central lies on the intersection of Poonamallee High road, Pallavan Salai, and Wall Tax Road in the Park Town area in Central Chennai. The main entrance is located on the Poonamallee High road, with the eastern side opening on to the Wall Tax road, and the western entrance leading to the suburban terminal. The Buckingham Canal runs beneath the main and suburban terminals. As the portion of canal running near the terminus is covered for about 250 m (820 ft), it often leads to garbage accumulation and necessitates regular desilting.

The main terminal of the station is spread over an area of 51,182 m^{2} (550,920 sq ft) with a built up area of 14,062 m^{2} (151,360 sq ft). The building was originally designed by George Harding and built in the Gothic Revival and Romanesque Revival architecture in 1873. The station was modified further by the design of Robert Fellowes Chisholm, with the addition of the central clock tower, caps on the main towers, and other changes, and the redesign was eventually completed in 1900. It has been declared as a heritage building. The clock tower, the tallest of the towers of the main building, has four faces and reaches a height of 136 ft (41 m) The clock is set to chime every quarter of an hour and every hour. The station building has been painted in maroon colour since its inception in 1873.

== Infrastructure ==
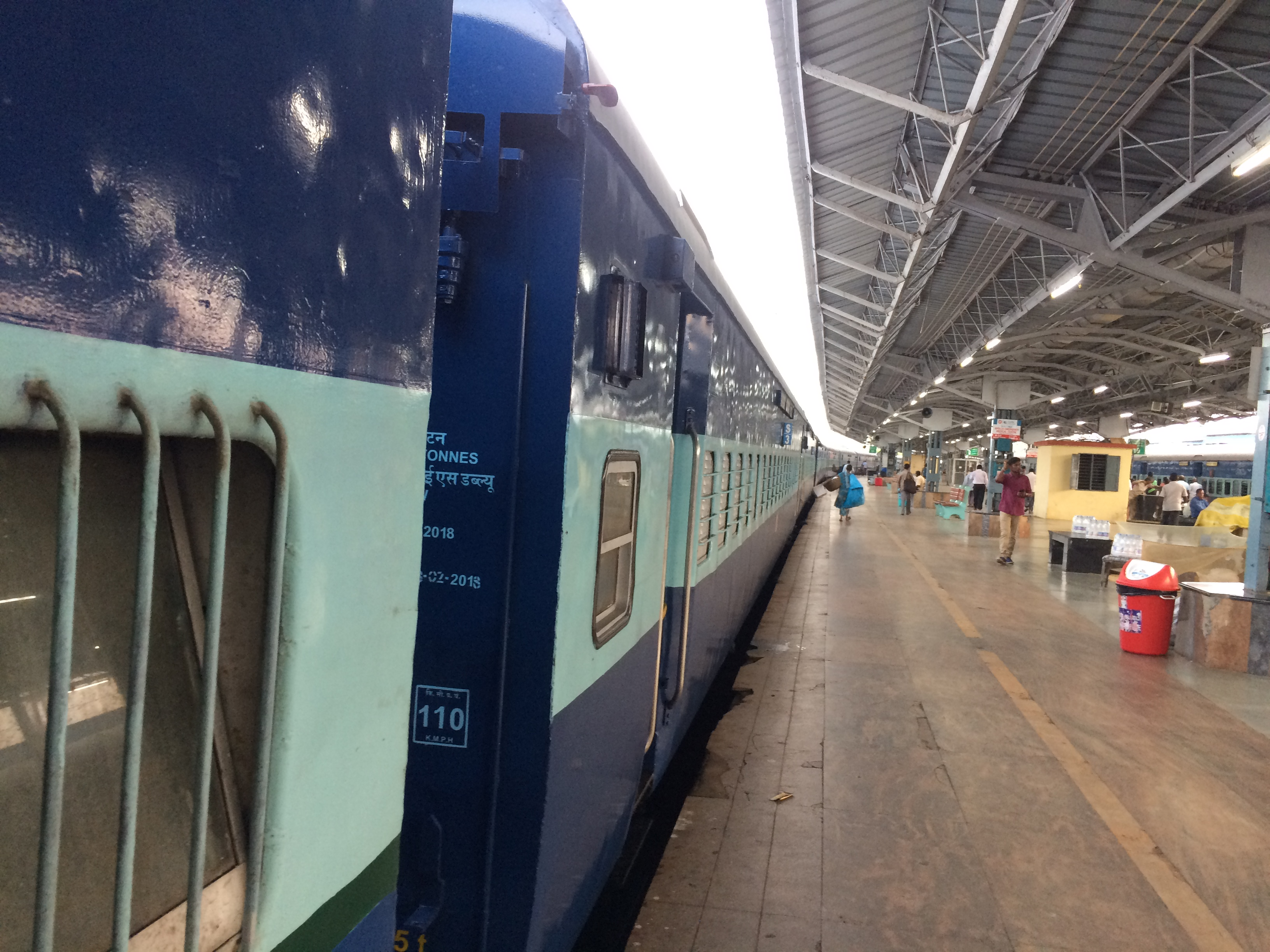
A platform at the station

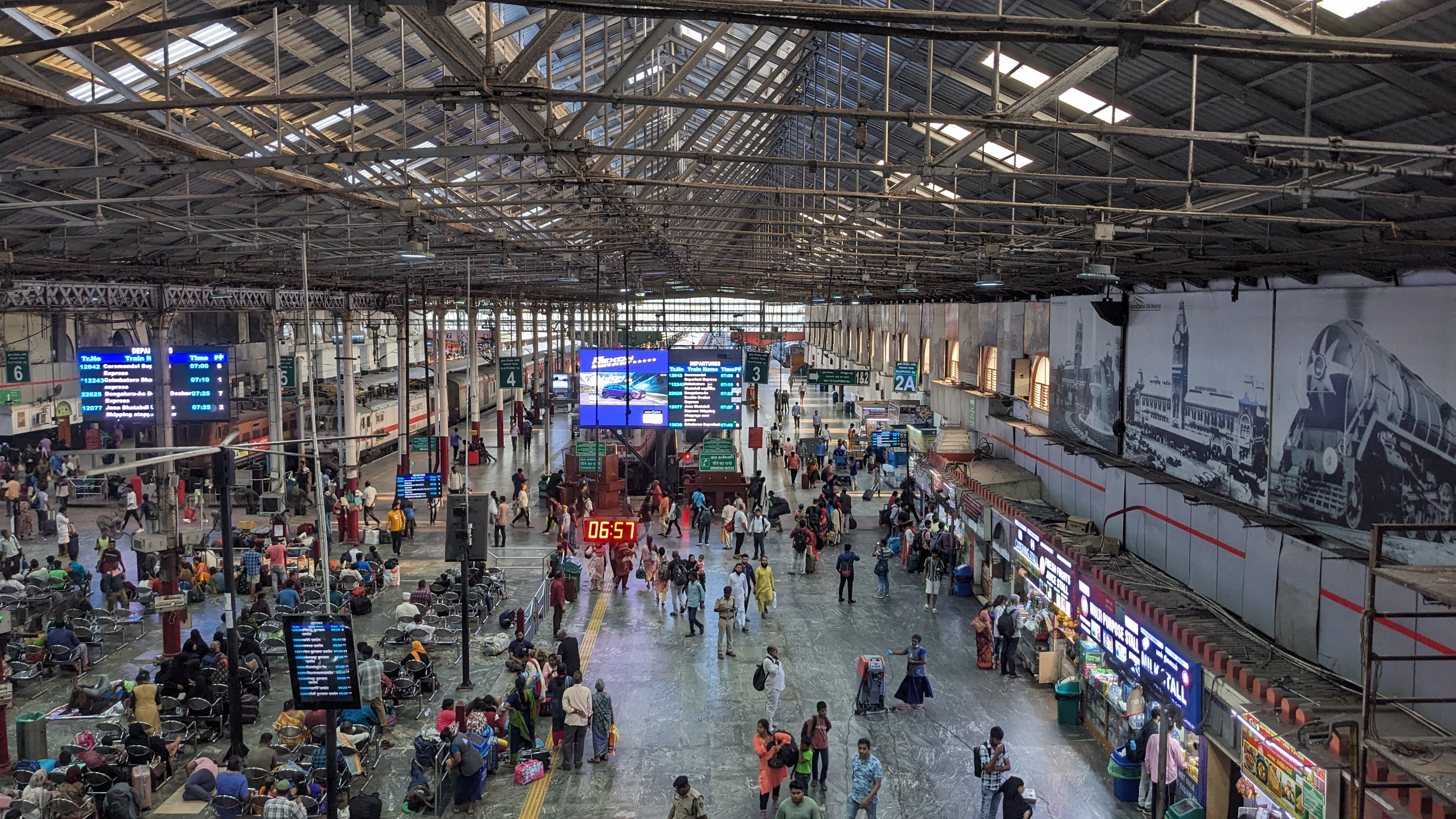
Main concourse

The station has 17 bay platforms including five at the suburban terminal. The platforms one to eleven, averaging about 600 m (2,000 ft) in length, can accommodate trains with up to 24 coaches. A shorter platform designated as 2A, can accommodate trains with 18 coaches. There are various waiting areas with the main waiting hall capable of accommodating up to 1,000 people. However, the main concourses are often crowded. The station has three split-flap timing boards, and electronic display boards, that mention train timings and platform number. There are seven passenger operated enquiry terminals, a passenger information center, and information kiosks. However, most platforms are not equipped with individual coach position display boards. On 26 September 2014, Chennai Central became the first in the country to get free Wi-Fi connectivity. The facility is provided by RailTel, a public sector telecom infrastructure provider.

There are various commercial establishments such as bookshops, restaurants, and eateries inside the station. Drinking water is supplied by taps located along the platforms. In September 2018, a 5,000-litre reverse osmosis plant was commissioned in the station, with the water distributed through kiosks located across the platforms. The station has about ten toilets. Licensed railway porters provide baggage services to the passengers. Four-seater battery operated vehicles are available for ferrying passengers. Following a Madras High Court order in 2012, a medical care centre was opened on 15 April 2013. The centre has three beds, and is staffed with three doctors, four nurses, and a paramedic team. It is equipped with oxygen cylinders, an electrocardiogram, a defibrillator, resuscitation equipment, and an ambulance.

The station has parking facilities for about 1,000 two-wheelers, and four-wheelers each. A premium car park, with a capacity to accommodate 80 cars, is located between the main building and suburban terminal. The station is divided into two zones for cleaning and maintenance, staffed by about 70 personnel. Trains arriving at the station undergo primary maintenance, which involves exterior and interior cleaning, filling water, cleaning of toilets, and required mechanical and electrical overhaul. About 405 maintenance employees are employed by the Indian Railways.

=== Security ===
The Railway Protection Force is responsible for the security of the station. A government railway police station is located on the first floor, and is headed by a deputy superintendent. The police operate a helpline known as Kaakum karangal ('Protecting hands'). The station is divided into six sectors and is staffed by 24 police personnel. In May 2022, a bomb squad started functioning at the station. In 2009, a security boundary wall was erected along the western side, and surveillance cameras were installed at the platforms in the suburban terminal. Two security booths were established, one each at the main and the suburban terminii. In 2009, 39 CCTV cameras were installed in the main terminal and a central control room was established. In 2012, about 120 cameras were added in the station. On 15 November 2012, an integrated security system was launched at the station, which included installation of 54 IP-based cameras, under-vehicle scanning system at entries and exits, and personal and X-ray baggage screening systems. In addition, explosive detection and disposal squads were deployed. Existing cameras were also integrated to the news system.

== Network and services ==
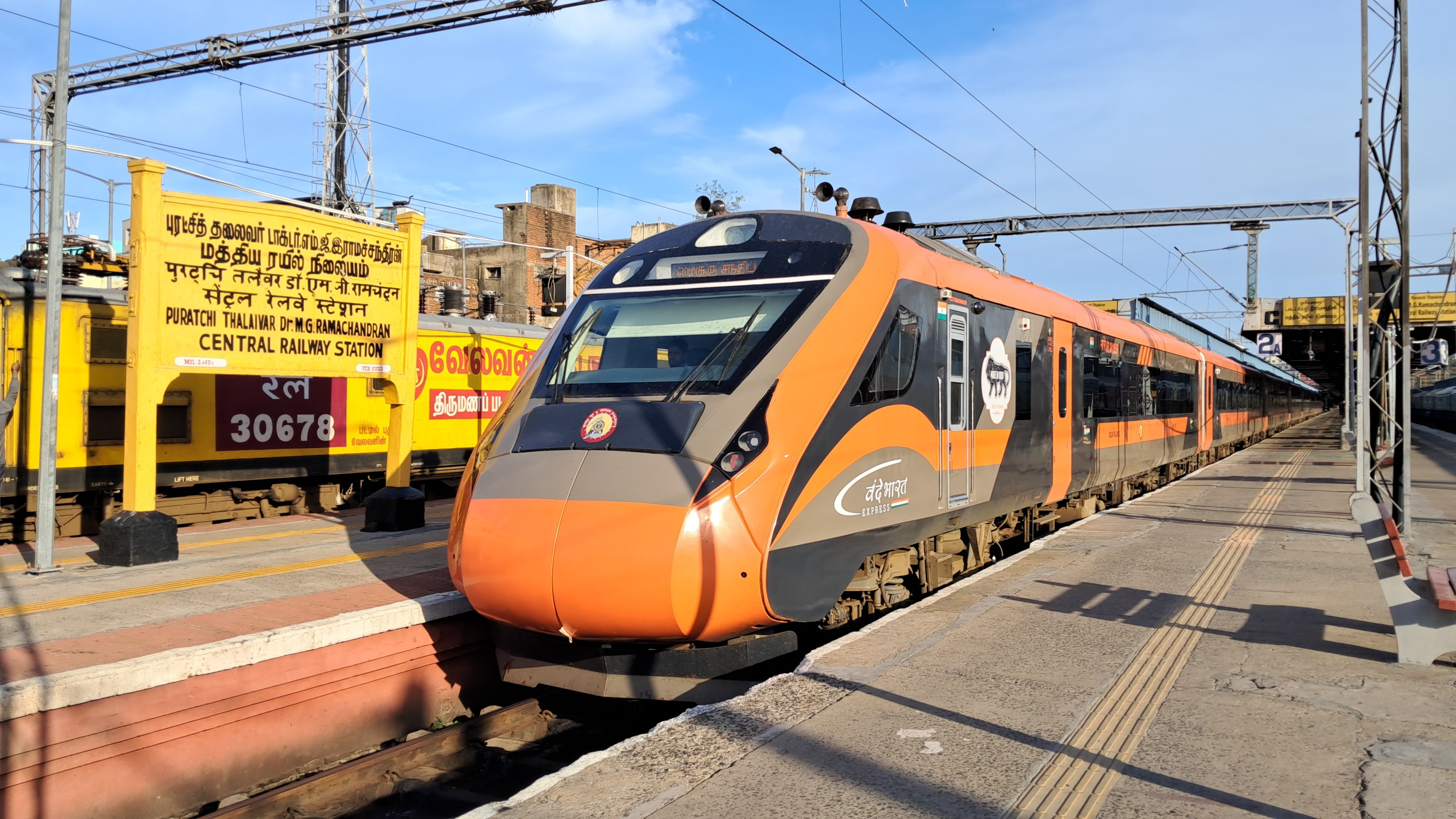
Vande Bharat Express at the station

Chennai Central serves as one of the terminii of the various trunk routes of the Indian Railways viz. Chennai–Bengaluru, Chennai–Howrah, Chennai–Mumbai, and Chennai–New Delhi. The terminus is connected to the nearby Egmore station, by a circuitous 11.2 km (7.0 mi) route via Chennai Beach. While there were proposals to connect the two termini by means of an elevated track, the plan was late dropped. It is a terminal station, and the lines branch out from the nearby Basin Bridge Junction, which results in congestion and traffic challenges due to the non-availability of platforms at Chennai Central. A bridge across the Buckingham Canal connects the terminus with the railway yards and stations to the north. The 33.02 m (108.3 ft)-long bridge, carries six tracks, and was completed in March 2011.

Chennai Central is one of the busiest railway stations in South India and a major rail hub in the country. As of 2023, it handles about 200 Mail/Express trains, and the suburban terminus handles about 1000 Suburban/Multiple Unit services daily. It handles about 730,000 passengers per day. The station is also a major transit point for freight trains. It handles sea food and other cargo from the port. It also serves as a main transit station for India Post. In 2024, the station generated a revenue of ₹12.993 billion (US$140 million), and was the third highest revenue earning station of the Indian Railways.

== Yards and sheds ==
A coach maintenance depot is located at the northern side of the terminus, where trains are checked, cleaned and readied for the next trips. It is the largest train care centre under the Southern Railway, and is equipped with 14 pit lines including two lines to accommodate 24-coach trains, and the rest designed to park 18-coach trains. The Water used for washing are out into the Buckingham Canal by means of drainage channels. However, as the yard is located in a basin area, water does not drain quickly enough, and leads to pest infestation and other hygiene issues.

The terminus has a trip shed for housing electric locomotives, located to the north of the train care centre. Locomotive sheds at Royapuram, and Tondiarpet, also serve for housing locomotives. There is a goods shed at Salt Cotaurs.

== Connectivity ==
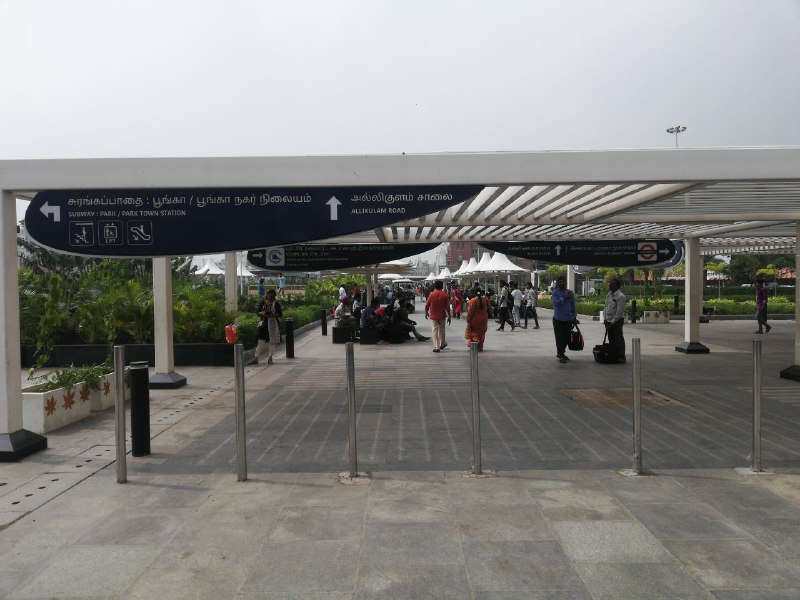
Thoroughfare at Central Square

The station forms an important junction for various lines of the suburban network. Moore Market complex, serves as the hub for suburban trains on the North, West, West North, and West South lines. The Chennai Park suburban station, that forms part of the South, and South West lines, is situated across the Central station. The Park Town station, which is part of the Chennai MRTS network, is located adjacent to the Park station. The Central metro station, serves as the intersection of the Blue and Green Lines of the Chennai metro. A series of subways and passageways in the Central Square connect the station to the other side of the road, and the nearby suburban and metro stations. However, jaywalking prevails as a substantial number of commuters prefer crossing the road, at times resulting in accidents.

Chennai Central is serviced by buses operated by the Metropolitan Transport Corporation, accessible from the bus lanes in front of the main entrance. There are prepaid auto and taxi stands at the station premises.

== Incidents ==
On 14 August 2006, a fire broke out at the station, which destroyed a book store.

On 29 April 2009, four passengers were killed and 11 were injured, when a suburban train was hijacked by an unidentified man, who later rammed it into a stationary goods train at the Vyasarpadi Jeeva railway station, 4 km (2.5 mi) northwest of Chennai Central. The train, which was scheduled to depart at 5:15 am, was hijacked at 4:50 am, with 35 passengers onboard, and accelerated to 92 km/h (57 mph) before collision.

On 6 August 2012, a man climbed atop the clock tower of the station's main building, and had to be brought back by the police and railway officials.

On 1 May 2014, two low-intensity blasts occurred in two coaches of the stationary Guwahati–Bengaluru Cantt. Superfast Express, killing one female passenger and injuring at least fourteen others.

In 2020, there were various disruption in train services due to COVID-19, with majority of the services suspended for nearly six months.

== In popular culture ==
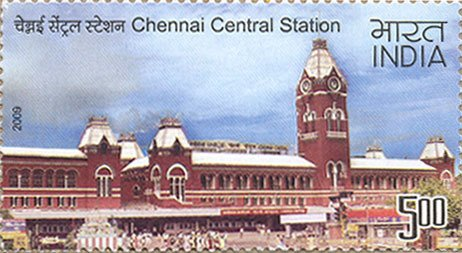
2009 India Post commemorative stamp

Chennai Central has featured in various media and other pop culture in the region. Many films and television programs have been filmed at the station and the surroundings.

The station was the subject of the 1989 poem Madras Central by Vijay Nambisan.

In 2009, India Post released a postal stamp featuring the station.

== See also ==
- Architecture of Chennai
- Transport in Chennai
