= Whitefield–KSR Bengaluru City MEMU =

Overview
- Service type: MEMU
- Locale: Karnataka
- First service: 17 January 2017; 9 years ago
- Current operator: South Western Railway

Route
- Termini: Whitefield (Bangalore) (WFD); Bangalore City (SBC)
- Stops: 12
- Distance travelled: 23 km (14 mi)
- Average journey time: 40m
- Service frequency: Daily (Note: Runs seven days in a week for every direction.)
- Train number: 66541UP/66542DN

On-board services
- Class: Unreserved
- Seating arrangements: Yes
- Sleeping arrangements: No
- Catering facilities: No
- Entertainment facilities: No
- Baggage facilities: No

Technical
- Track gauge: 5 ft 6 in (1,676 mm)
- Operating speed: 35 km/h (22 mph) average with halts

Whitefield–KSR Bengaluru City MEMU is a MEMU train of the Indian Railways, which runs between Whitefield railway station and Bangalore City railway station in Karnataka. It is currently being operated with 66541UP/66542DN train numbers on Daily basis.

== Route and halts ==
The important halts of the train are:

- Whitefield (Bangalore)
- Hoodi Halt
- Krishnarajapuram
- Baiyyappanahali
- Bangalore East
- Bangalore Cantonment
- Bangalore City

== Average speed and frequency ==
The 66541/Whitefield–KSR Bengaluru MEMU runs with an average speed of 35 km/h and completes 23 km in 3h 5m. The 66542/KSR Bengaluru–Whitefield MEMU runs with an average speed of 25 km/h and completes 23 km in 55m.

== See also ==
- Bangalore City railway station
- Whitefield railway station
- Bangalore City–Kolar DEMU (via Chikkaballapur)
- Bangalore City–Dharmapuri DEMU
