= Periamet =

Periamet பெரியமேடு
- Neighbourhood
- Location within Chennai Location within Tamil Nadu Location within India
- Coordinates: 13.083658°N 80.267952°E
- Country: India
- State: Tamil Nadu
- District: Chennai
- Metro: Chennai
- Zone: Royapuram
- Talukas: Purasaiwalkam
- Elevation: 5 m (16 ft)

Languages
  - Official: Tamil
- Time zone: UTC+5:30 (IST)
- PIN: 600003
- Telephone code: 044
- Planning agency: CMDA
- City: Chennai
- Lok Sabha constituency: Chennai North
- Civic agency: Chennai Corporation

Periamet, also known as Periyampet natively spelt as Periyamedu (Note: Periamet is the anglicized spelling in British English that was used in the Madras Presidency, and Periyamēḍŭ is the romanized spelling from Tamil script.), is one of the most important neighborhoods in North Chennai, a metropolitan city in Tamil Nadu, India

== Location ==
Periamet is located near Chennai Central Railway Station, very close to the historic Ripon buildings.

== Surroundings ==
Periamet is known for commercial leather hub. It has many leather trading offices and leather shoe shops. Proximity to Chennai Central Railway Station makes this place famous and hence many hotels and lodges have come after the turn of the century and are operating successfully. The commercial activity and footfall is also increased due to Nehru Stadium which often hosts sports and games at national & international level.

Periamet Mosque is very famous in Chennai.

== Transportation ==
Many number of buses ply through Periamet, and Chennai Central Railway Station and Egmore are very near to Periamet.
