= Sealdah–Berhampore Court MEMU =

Indian Railways passenger train operating in West Bengal

Overview
- Service type: MEMU
- Locale: West Bengal
- First service: 4 December 2013; 12 years ago
- Current operator: Eastern Railway

Route
- Termini: Sealdah; Berhampore Court
- Stops: 23
- Distance travelled: 186 km (116 mi)
- Average journey time: 4h 15m
- Service frequency: Daily
- Train number: 63105/63106

On-board services
- Seating arrangements: Yes
- Sleeping arrangements: Yes
- Catering facilities: No
- Entertainment facilities: No
- Baggage facilities: No

Technical
- Track gauge: 5 ft 6 in (1,676 mm)
- Operating speed: 44 km/h (27 mph) average with halts

Sealdah–Berhampore Court MEMU is a passenger train of the Indian Railways which runs between Sealdah and Berhampore Court, both within West Bengal.

== Average speed and frequency ==
The train runs with an average speed of 41 km/h (25 mph) and completes 186 km (116 mi) in 4hrs 15min.
