= Mahesana–Abu Road DEMU =

Overview
- Service type: MEMU
- Current operator: North Western Railway zone

Route
- Termini: Mahesana Junction (MSH); Abu Road (ABR)
- Stops: 15
- Distance travelled: 117 km (73 mi)
- Average journey time: 55 m
- Service frequency: Daily (Note: Runs seven days in a week for every direction.)
- Train number: 79437/7948

On-board services
- Class: General Unreserved
- Seating arrangements: Yes
- Sleeping arrangements: No
- Catering facilities: No
- Observation facilities: ICF coach
- Entertainment facilities: No
- Baggage facilities: Below the seats

Technical
- Rolling stock: 2
- Track gauge: 1,676 mm (5 ft 6 in)
- Operating speed: 37 km/h (23 mph) average with halts

Mahesana–Abu Road DEMU is a DEMU train belonging to North Western Railway zone that runs between Mahesana Junction in Gujarat and Abu Road of Rajasthan. It is currently being operated with 79437/7948 train numbers on daily basis.

== Route and halts ==
The important halts of the train are:

- Mahesana Junction
- Palanpur Junction
- Abu Road

== Average speed and frequency ==
The train runs with an average speed of 37 km/h and completes 117 km in 3 hrs 10 min. There are seven trains which runs on a daily basis.

== Rake sharing ==
The rake is shared with 79431/79432 Sabarmati–Mahesana DEMU.

== See also ==
- Mahesana Junction railway station
- Abu Road railway station
