= Raichur–Gadwal–Kacheguda DEMU =

Passenger train service in India

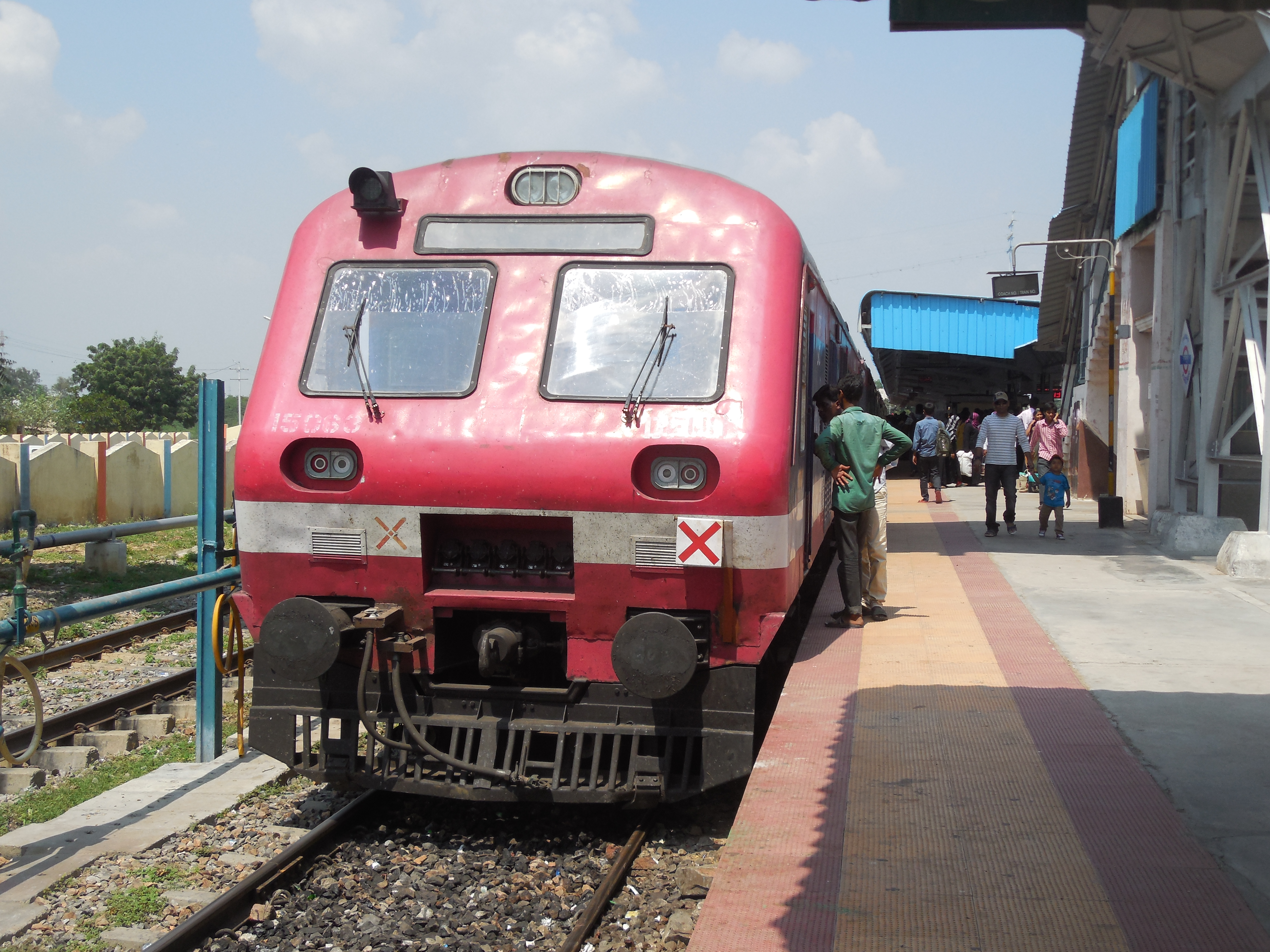
- Raichur–Gadwal–Kacheguda DEMU at Raichur railway station

Overview
- Service type: Passenger
- First service: 12 October 2013; 12 years ago
- Current operator: South Central Railways

Route
- Termini: Kacheguda (KCG); Raichur (RC)
- Stops: 19
- Distance travelled: 238 km (148 mi)
- Average journey time: 5 hours 55 minutes
- Service frequency: 6 days a week
- Train number: 17693/17694

On-board services
- Class: General Unreserved
- Seating arrangements: Yes
- Sleeping arrangements: No
- Catering facilities: No
- Entertainment facilities: No

Technical
- Track gauge: 1,676 mm (5 ft 6 in) broad gauge

Raichur–Gadwal–Kacheguda DEMU is a train between Raichur in Karnataka and Kacheguda in Telangana established in October 2013. The train numbers were 77693/94. It runs between Raichur and Kacheguda via Gadwal, Mahbubnagar and Shamshabad.

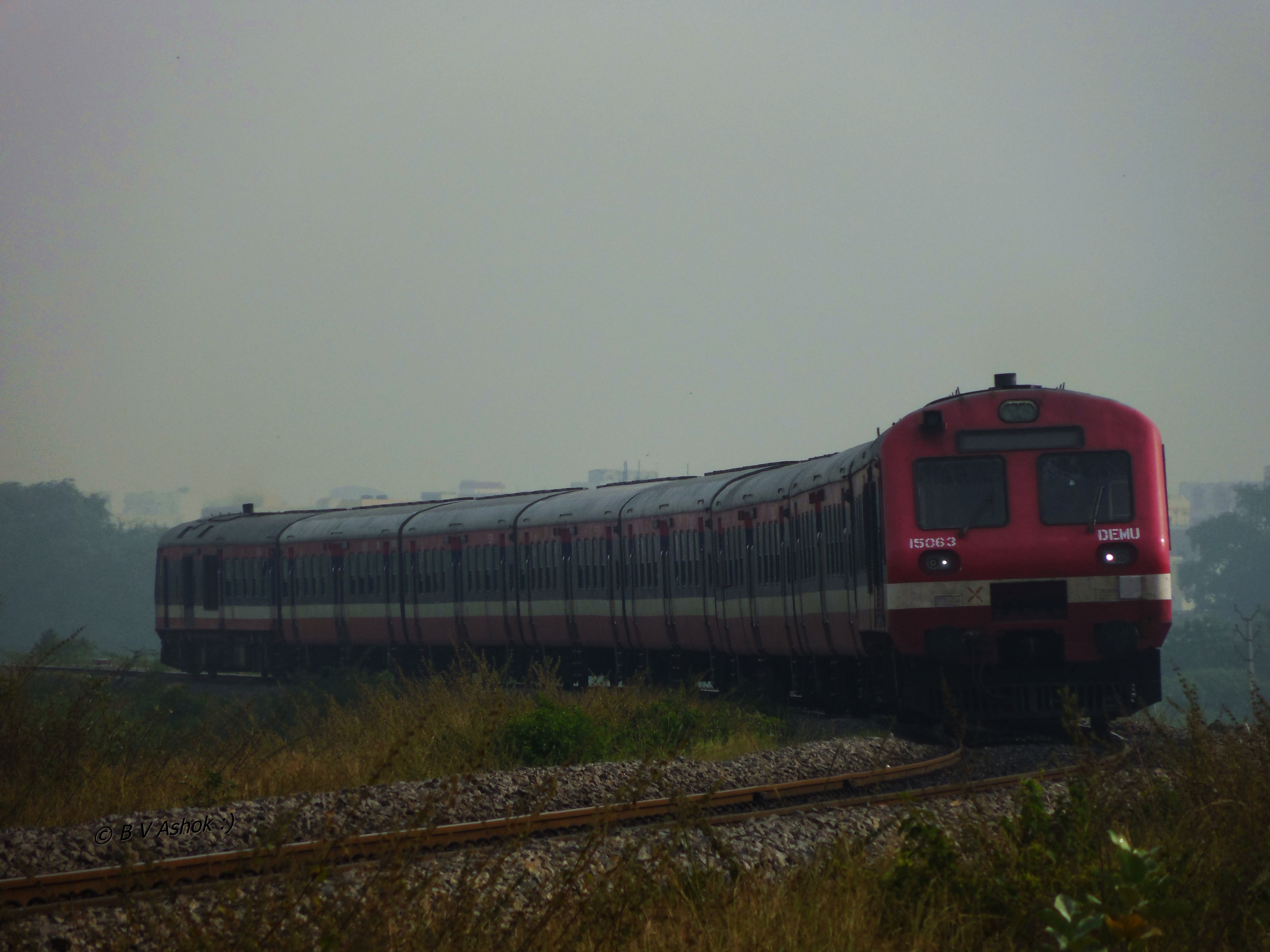
Train No. 77693 Kacheguda - Raichur DEMU near Umdanagar

The train started after a line between Gadwal and Raichur was laid in October 2013. The line has three new stations at Chandrabanda (halt) in Karnataka, Pandurangaswamy Road (crossing station) and Priyadarshini Jurala Project Road (halt) in Andhra Pradesh.
