= Amritsar Mail =

Train in India

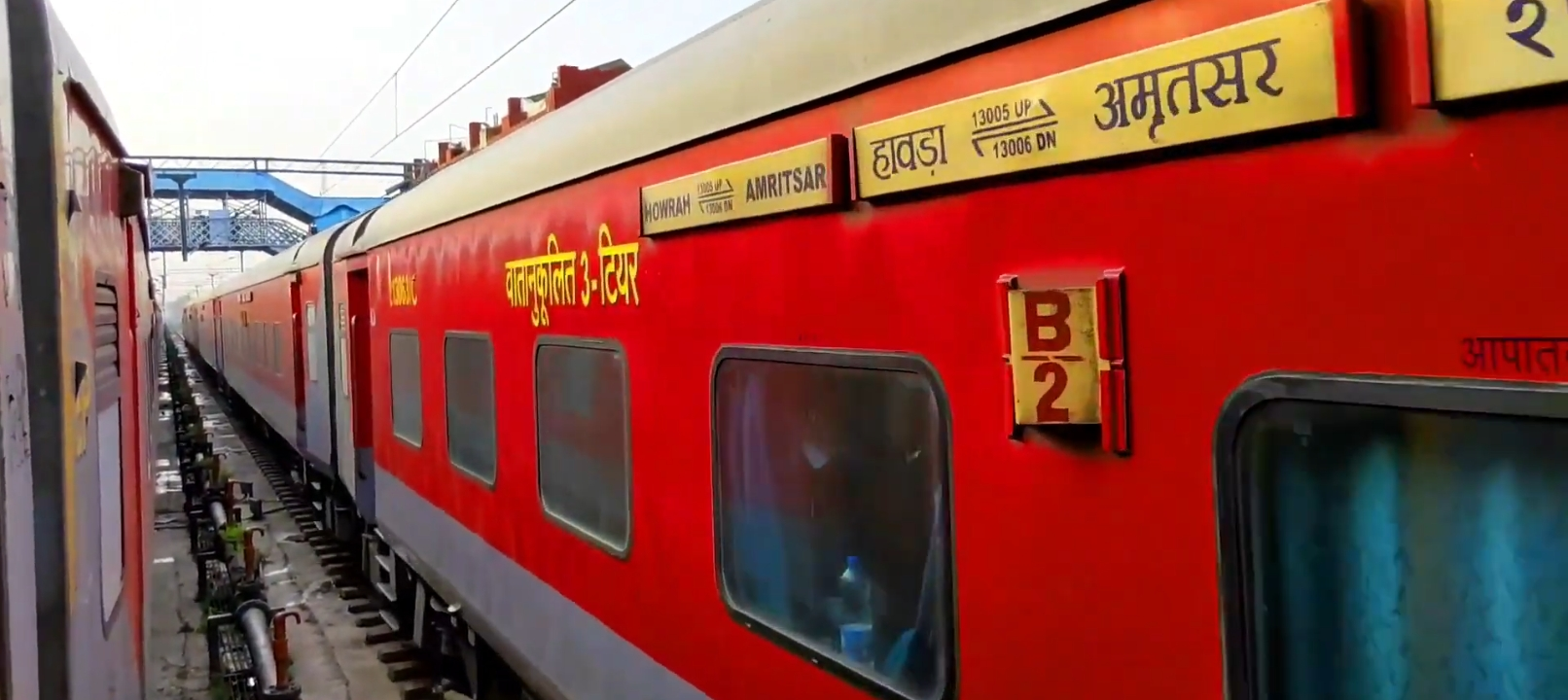
- Amritsar Mail At Ambala Cantt Junction

Overview
- Service type: Mail/Express
- First service: 1 January 1884; 142 years ago
- Current operator: Eastern Railway

Route
- Termini: Howrah (HWH); Amritsar (ASR)
- Stops: 55
- Distance travelled: 1,911 km (1,187 mi)
- Average journey time: 36 hrs 45 mins
- Service frequency: Daily
- Train number: 13005 / 13006

On-board services
- Classes: AC First Class, AC 2 Tier, AC 3 Tier, AC 3 Tier Economy, Sleeper Class, General Unreserved
- Seating arrangements: Yes
- Sleeping arrangements: Yes
- Catering facilities: Available
- Observation facilities: Large windows
- Baggage facilities: Available
- Other facilities: Below the seats

Technical
- Rolling stock: LHB coach
- Track gauge: 1,676 mm (5 ft 6 in)
- Operating speed: 52 km/h (32 mph) average including halts.

The Amritsar Mail, colloquially known as the Punjab Mail in the eastern part of India, is a mail train operated by the Eastern Railway Zone of Indian Railways. This train serves as a vital link connecting the capital city of West Bengal, Kolkata, with the historic and revered pilgrimage city of Amritsar in India. It operates under the train numbers 13005 from Howrah Junction in Kolkata to Amritsar Junction, and 13006 on its return journey.

== History ==
The Howrah–Amritsar Mail holds the distinction of being one of the oldest operating Mail trains within the Indian Railways network. It commenced service on 1 January 1884, with the primary purpose of transporting British officials, including military and civil service personnel along with their families, from Howrah in undivided Bengal to Lahore Junction & Peshawar in the undivided Punjab region. Originally known as the 05 UP / 06 DN Punjab Mail, it was operated by the East Indian Railway Company (EIR) alongside another prestigious train, the 01 UP / 02 DN East India Mail (now known as Kalka Mail / Netaji Express). Around the same period, in 1889, the Great Indian Peninsular Railway (GIPR) introduced its own Punjab Mail, running from Mumbai Victoria Terminus (now Chhatrapati Shivaji Maharaj Terminus) to Lahore Junction via Peshawar. Both trains shared identical numbering (05 UP / 06 DN), a reflection of the independent operations of various railway companies under the British Raj.
