= Sabarmati–Mahesana DEMU =

Overview
- Service type: DEMU
- Current operator: Western Railway zone

Route
- Termini: Sabarmati Junction (SBIB); Mahesana (MSH)
- Stops: 7
- Distance travelled: 63 km (39 mi)
- Average journey time: 1 hours 20 minutes
- Service frequency: Daily (Note: Runs seven days in a week for every direction.)
- Train number: 79431/79432

On-board services
- Class: General Unreserved
- Seating arrangements: Yes
- Sleeping arrangements: No
- Catering facilities: No
- Observation facilities: ICF coach
- Entertainment facilities: No
- Baggage facilities: Below the seats

Technical
- Rolling stock: 1
- Track gauge: 1,676 mm (5 ft 6 in)
- Operating speed: 47 km/h (29 mph) average with halts

Sabarmati–Mahesana DEMU is a DEMU train belonging to Western Railway zone that runs between Sabarmati Junction in Gujarat and Mahesana Junction of Gujarat. It is currently being operated with 79431/79432 train numbers on daily basis.

== Route and halts ==
The important halts of the train are:

- Sabarmati Junction
- Kalol Junction
- Ambliyasan Junction
- Mahesana Junction

== Average speed and frequency ==
- 79431/Sabarmati–Mahesana DEMU has average speed of 47 km/h and completes 63 km in 1 hour 20 minutes.
- 79432/Mahesana–Sabarmati DEMU has average speed of 38 km/h and completes 63 km in 1 hour 40 minutes. There are seven trains which run on a daily basis

== Schedule ==
Train number	Departure station	Departure time	Departure day	Arrival station	Arrival time	Arrival day
14803	Sabarmati Junction	15:35	Daily	Mahesana Junction	16:55	Daily
14804	Mahesana Junction	07:55	Daily	Sabarmati Junction	09:35	Daily

== Traction ==
DEMU: Rated power is 1600 HP and has 10 coaches with maximum speed is 110 kmph. Transmission is AC electric. Rakes are made at ICF coach.

== Rake sharing ==
The rake is shared with 79437/7948 Mahesana–Abu Road DEMU

== See also ==
- Mahesana Junction railway station
- Mahesana–Abu Road DEMU
