= Salt Cotaurs =

- Neighbourhood
- Location within Chennai Location within Tamil Nadu Location within India
- Coordinates: 13.09306°N 80.27417°E
- Country: India
- State: Tamil Nadu
- District: Chennai District
- Metro: Chennai
- Zone: Pulianthope
- Ward: 47
- Talukas: Fort-Tondiarpet

Government
  - Body: Chennai Corporation

Languages
  - Official: Tamil
- Time zone: UTC+5:30 (IST)
- PIN: 600 112
- Lok Sabha constituency: Chennai North
- Planning agency: CMDA
- Civic agency: Chennai Corporation
- Website: www.chennai.tn.nic.in

Salt Cotaurs is a neighbourhood in Chennai, India. It is located on the bank of the Buckingham Canal, north of Chennai Central railway station, between the Elephant Gate Bridge Road and Basin Bridge railway station. It is well known for its railway goods yard owned by Southern Railway. The Lost Property Office (LPO) of the Southern Railway (Chennai Division) is also located here. It is about 6 to 10 m above sea level.

== Etymology ==
The word 'Cotaur' is the Anglicised version of the Tamil word "Kottaram" (Koṭṭāram கொட்டாரம்) meaning a granary or "godown". The locality once had a godown for storing salt bags and the loading station 'Salt Cotaurs'.

== Developments ==
The checkpoint at Salt Cotaurs is one of the eight checkpoints in the state of Tamil Nadu that are slated for modernisation at a cost of ₹ 333.6 million, along with 28 commercial taxes check-posts in the state.

In 2018, Southern Railway submitted a ₹780-million proposal to the Railway Board to develop Salt Cotaur as the fourth rail terminal within Chennai city and to ease the congestion at Chennai Central railway station by shifting the west-bound trains towards Jolarpettai side into the new terminal after completion.
