= Multiple units of India =

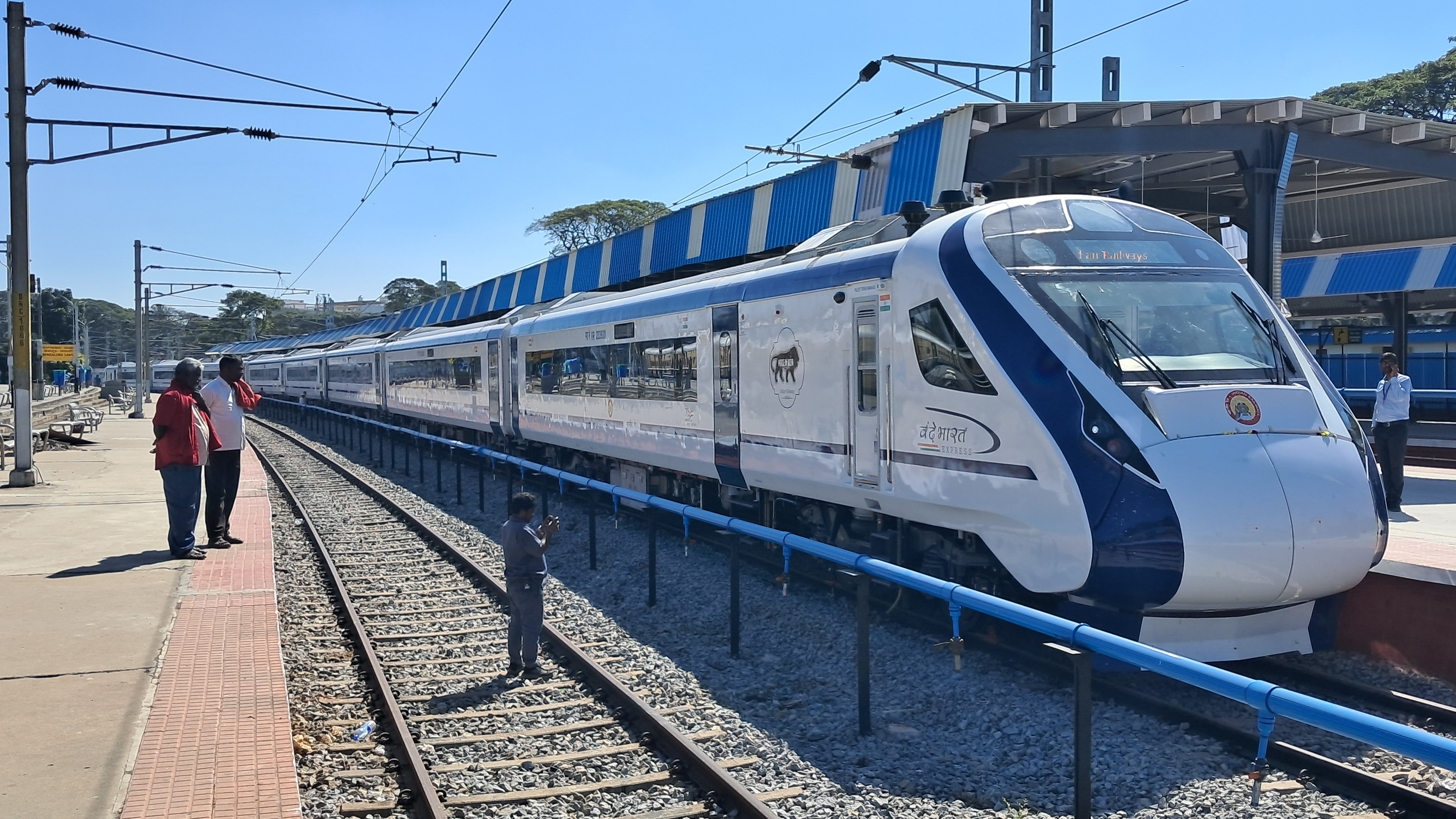
Vande Bharat Express at Bengaluru

A multiple-unit train or simply multiple unit (MU) is a self-propelled train composed of one or more carriages joined together, which when coupled to another multiple unit can be controlled by a single driver, with multiple-unit train control. Although multiple units consist of several carriages, single self-propelled carriages, such as railbuses and trams – are in fact multiple-units when two or more of them are working connected through multiple-unit train control.

In India, MUs are used for all suburban trains and metros and are increasingly used for short-medium-long distance trains also such as DEMUs, SSEMUs, MEMUs and Vande Bharat Express.

== Design ==
Most MUs are powered either by traction motors, receiving their power through a third rail or overhead wire (EMU), or by a diesel engine driving a generator producing electricity to drive traction motors (DMU).

A MU has the same power and traction components as a locomotive, but instead of the components being concentrated in one car, they are spread throughout the cars that make up the unit. In many cases, these cars can only propel themselves when they are part of the unit, so they are semi-permanently coupled. For example, in a DMU one car might carry the prime mover and traction motors, and another the engine for head-end power generation; an EMU might have one car carry the pantograph and transformer, and another car carry the traction motors. MU cars can be a motor or trailer car, it is not necessary for every one to be motorized.

== Usage ==
=== Rapid transit ===
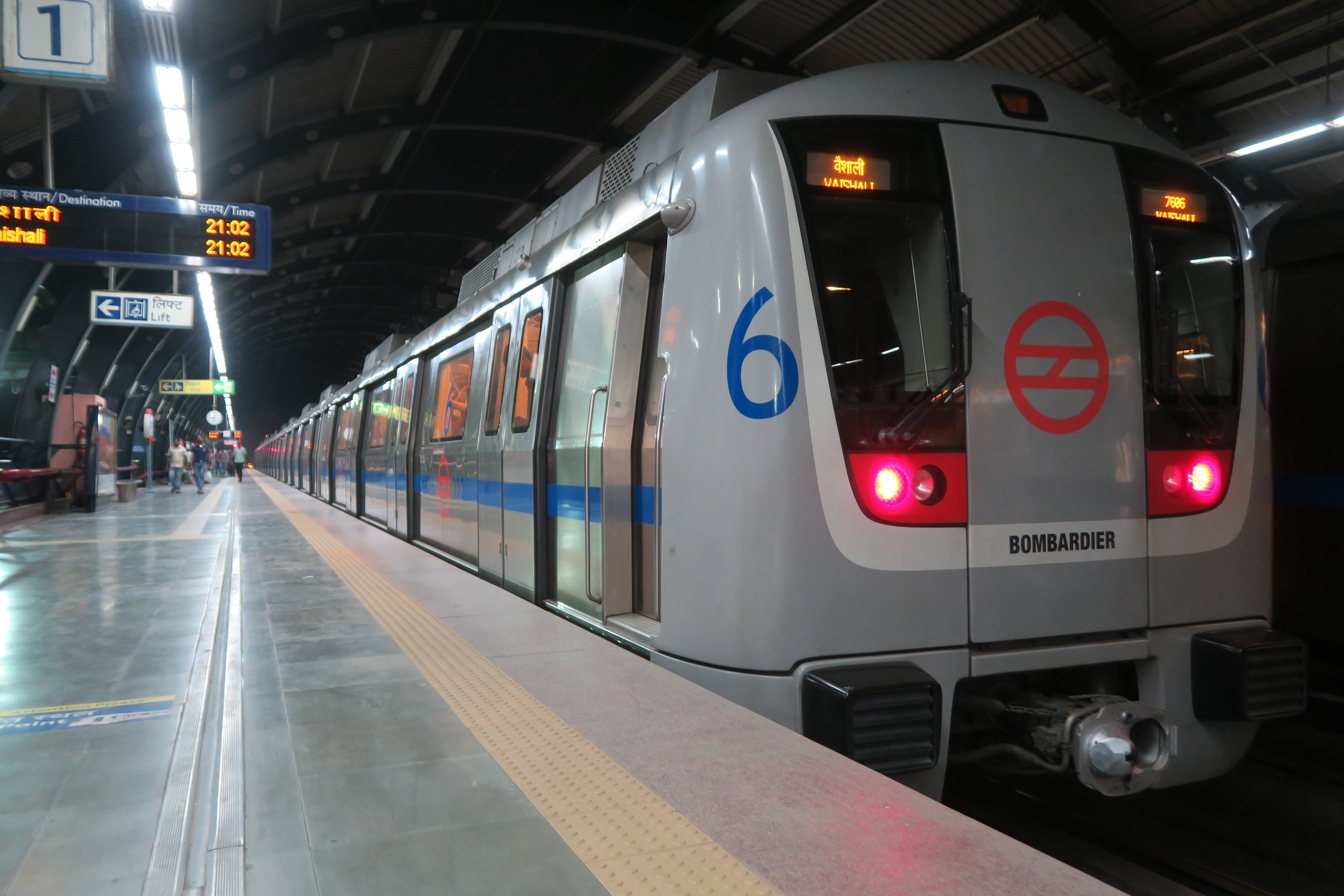
An EMU of the Delhi Metro

There are currently 16 operational rapid transit (popularly known as 'metro') systems in fifteen cities across India. With Delhi Metro being the largest metro system which connects too few other nearby cities in the National Capital Region. As of October 2022, India has 810 km (503 mi) of operational metro lines and 631 15 systems. A further 568.15 km of lines is under construction.

Metro trains are all electric multiple units (EMUs). Different metro systems have different configuration of trains. Earlier metro lines tended to use the mainline 5 ft 6 in (1,676 mm) Indian gauge while most of the more recent systems instead opt for 1,435 mm (4 ft 8 1/2 in) standard gauge for economies of scale with international systems. Power is varyingly supplied by either 750 V DC third rails as is typical on older metros in areas such as North America, Europe, the Middle East, Southeast Asia, and the former Soviet Union, or 25 kV AC 50 hz overhead catenary, which is very rare on metros outside of India. Delhi Metro uses Hyundai ROTEM EMUs and Bombardier MOVIA EMUs. Mumbai Metro uses CRRC, BEML EMUs.

=== Suburban ===
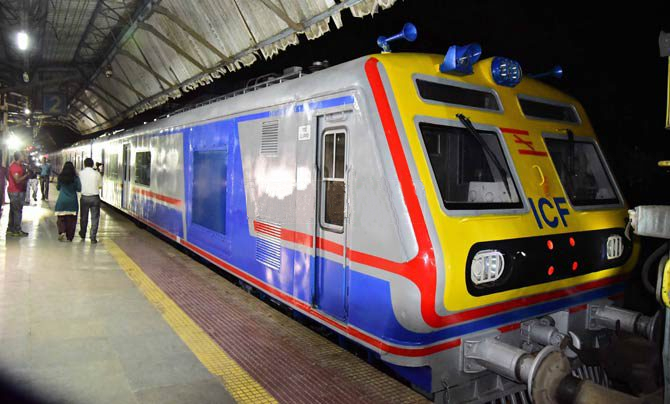
Air conditioned EMU of the Mumbai Suburban Railway

Suburban rail is a rail service between a central business district and the suburbs, a conurbation or other locations that draw large numbers of people daily. The trains are called suburban trains. These trains are also referred to as "local trains" or "locals".

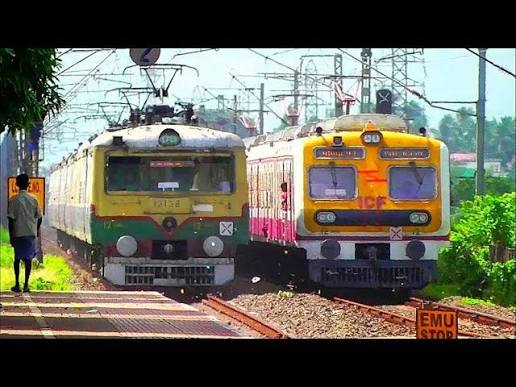
Left is the Single-Phase EMU and Right is the 3-Phase EMU.

Suburban trains that handle commuter traffic are all electric multiple units (EMUs). They usually have nine or twelve coaches, sometimes even fifteen, to handle rush hour traffic. One unit of an EMU train consists of one power car and two general coaches. Thus, a nine or twelve coach EMU is made up of three units having one power car at each end and one at the middle. The rakes in the suburban rails run on 25 kV AC. They are mainly of two types, Single-Phase EMUs and 3-Phase EMUs. Single-Phase EMUs are old and top speed is 120km/hr and 3-Phase EMUs are modern and top speed is 140km/hr. Single-Phase EMU are mainly of Aerodynamic and Flatface while 3-Phase EMU is only Aerodynamic. The suburban railways of Mumbai, Kolkata and Chennai occupy no more than 7.1% of the Indian Railways network, but account for 53.2% of all railway passengers. In some cities of India, the opening of rapid transit systems has led to a decline in the use of the suburban rail system.

=== SSEMU ===
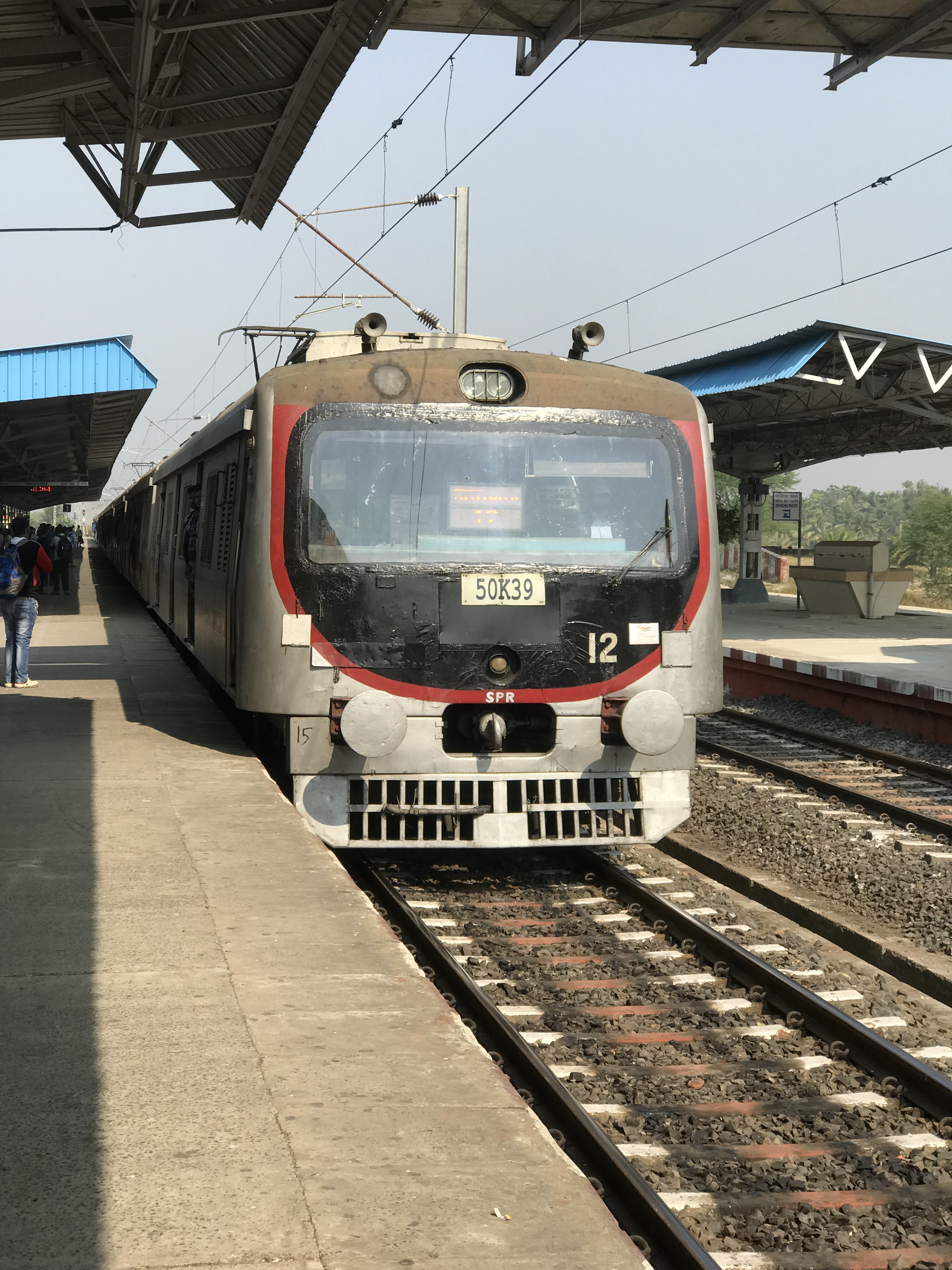
BEML SSEMU of the Kolkata Suburban Railway

SSEMU is an acronym for Stainless steel EMU. Most modern SSEMUs are produced by BEML, with manufacturing processes and internals different from MEMUs. They are operated by Single-Phase Motors. They have been specifically developed for coastal cities like Kolkata, Mumbai, Chennai etc. Stainless steel reduces corrosion and thus the maintenance cost of MEMUs. Indian Railways has already deployed SSEMUs in coastal regions of West Bengal and Tamil Nadu.

=== DEMU and MEMU ===
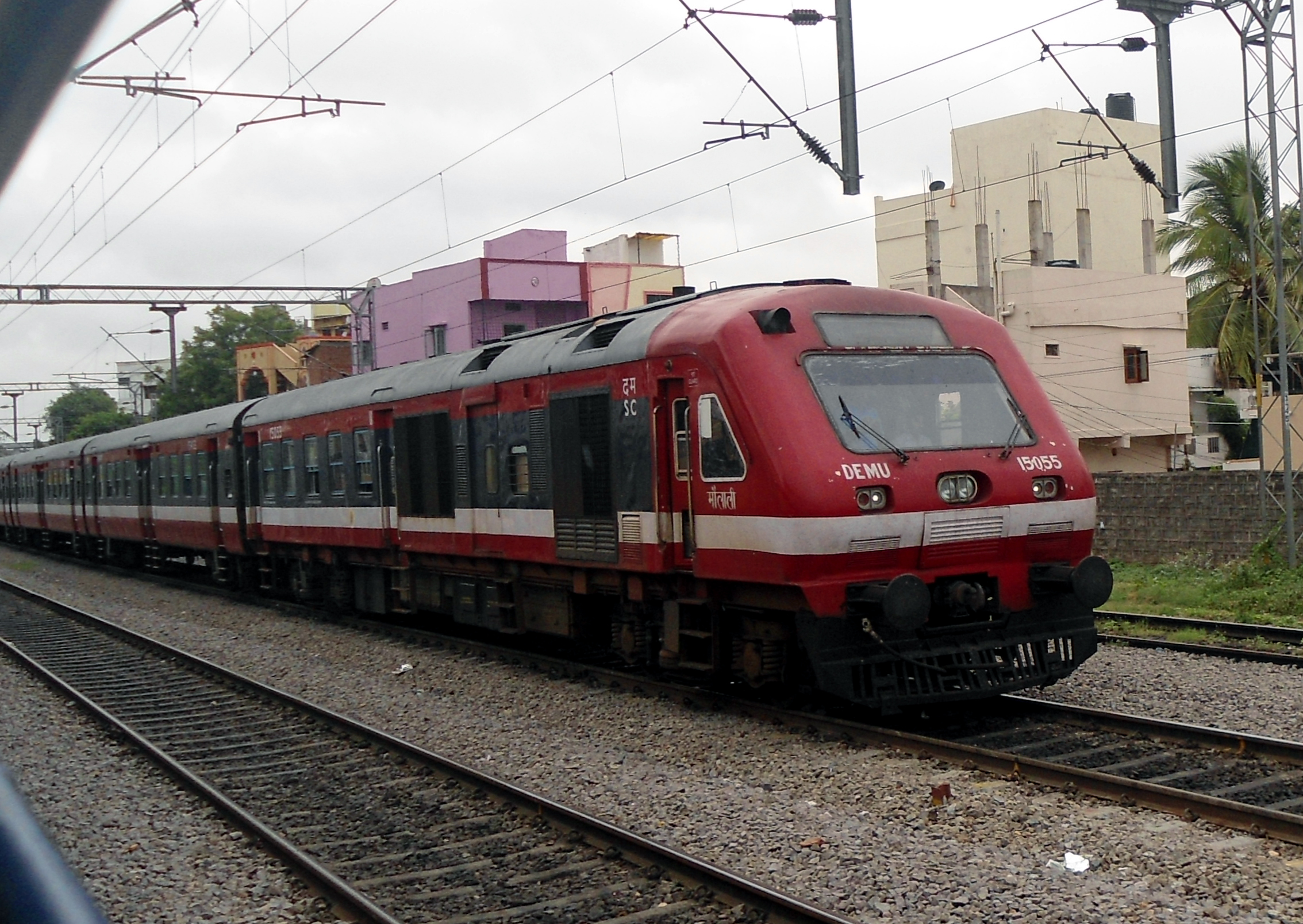
DEMU Local to Medchal at Sitaphalmandi railway station, Secunderabad

The DEMUs and MEMUs are diesel multiple units (DMUs) and electric multiple units (EMUs) that serve short and medium-distance routes in India, as compared to normal EMU trains that connect urban and suburban areas. The acronyms stand for "Diesel-Electric Multiple Unit" and "Mainline Electric Multiple Unit".

These have two-sided cabs for changing and reversing the route, which is a bigger advantage over the attachment-detachment process of rakes and locomotives. Indian Railways (IR) is progressively replacing all locomotive-hauled slow and fast passenger and intercity trains with various EMUs. After replacing with EMUs, passenger trains would be re-branded as either MEMU or DEMU.

=== Vande Bharat Express ===
The Vande Bharat Express, previously known as Train 18, is a semi-high-speed, electric multiple unit train, operated by the IR on few routes. It is a seater train which serves medium to long distance routes.

The Vande Bharat Express's exterior appearance consists of aerodynamic design, narrowing at each end of the train which is designed to combat air resistance. It has a driver cabin at each end, allowing for faster turnaround at terminating stations. The train has 16 passenger cars, with a seating capacity of 1,128 passengers. The chassis of a coach is 23 meters long, and the frame of the train is made entirely of stainless steel.

Alternate coaches are motorised to ensure even distribution of power and to help in quicker acceleration and deceleration. The gangways are interconnected and fully sealed to allow better mobility between coaches and to reduce noise respectively. The train features GPIS-based passenger information system, bio-vacuum toilets, and rotational seats which can be aligned in the direction of travel (only in executive class).

=== Tram ===
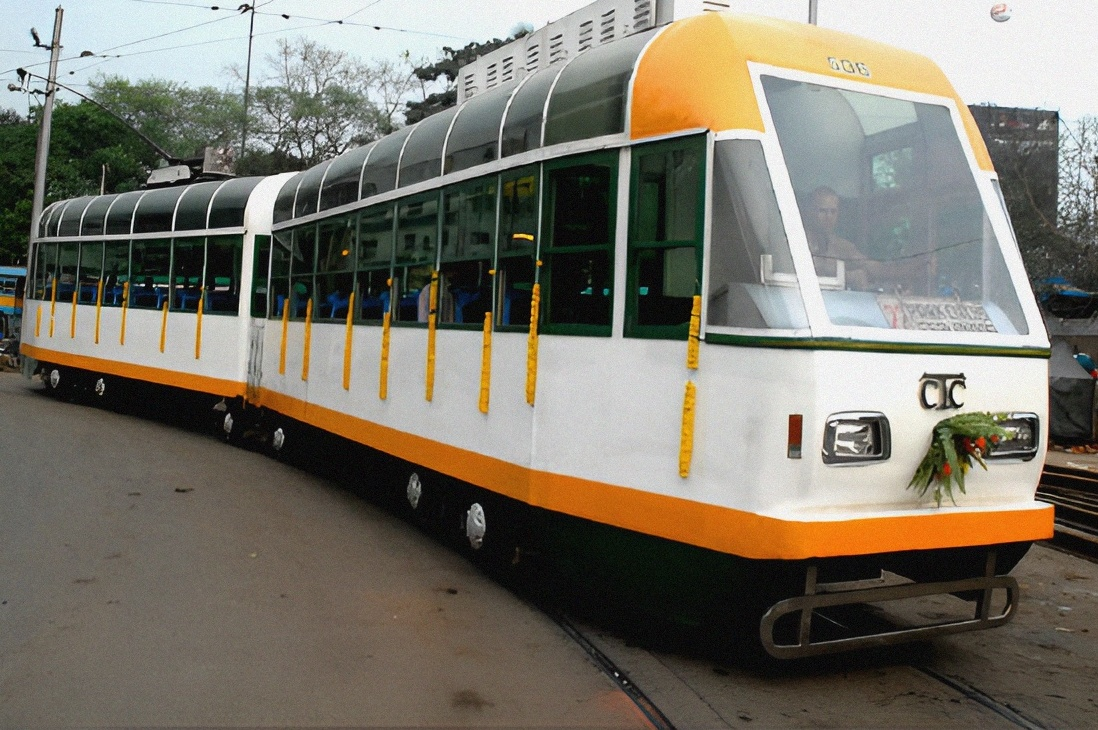
A double-coach tram in Kolkata

The double-coach trams in Kolkata are also multiple-units. The pantograph which draws power is in one coach and another coach is a trailer coach. Cabs are there at both ends.

== See also ==
- Locomotives of India
- Rail transport in India
- Indian Railways
- Namo Bharat
- Namo Bharat Rapid Rail (Vande Metro)
- Namo Green Rail
- Vande Bharat Sleeper (Train 20)
