= Jalandhar City–Amritsar DEMU =

Passenger train route in Punjab, India

Overview
- Service type: Passenger
- Locale: Punjab
- Current operator: Northern Railway

Route
- Termini: Amritsar railway station Jalandhar City Junction railway station
- Stops: 10
- Distance travelled: 79 km (49 mi)
- Average journey time: 1 hours 50 minutes
- Service frequency: Daily
- Train number: 74643 UP / 74644 DN

On-board services
- Class: DEMU
- Seating arrangements: Yes
- Sleeping arrangements: No
- Catering facilities: No
- Observation facilities: No
- Entertainment facilities: No
- Baggage facilities: No

Technical
- Track gauge: 5 ft 6 in (1,676 mm) broad gauge
- Operating speed: 39 km/h (24 mph) average with halts

Jalandhar City–Amritsar DEMU is a passenger train operated by Indian Railways. It runs between Amritsar railway station of Punjab and Jalandhar City Junction railway station of Punjab.

== Route ==
The train runs on Amritsar–Delhi main line. It stops at Jalandhar City Junction, Beas Junction and Amritsar Junction.

== Speed and frequency ==
The train runs with an average speed of 43 km/h and completes 79 km in 1 hours 50 min. The train runs daily.

== Accidents ==
74643/Jalandhar City–Amritsar DEMU crashed into spectators as they were standing and sitting on or near the tracks to see the burning of an effigy of demon Ravana as part of the Dussehra festival in the Joda Phatak area on the outskirts of Amritsar on October 19, 2018. The incident happened in the evening, killing at least 59 and injuring an additional 100.
